= Confraternity of penitents =

Christian associations for engaging in penance

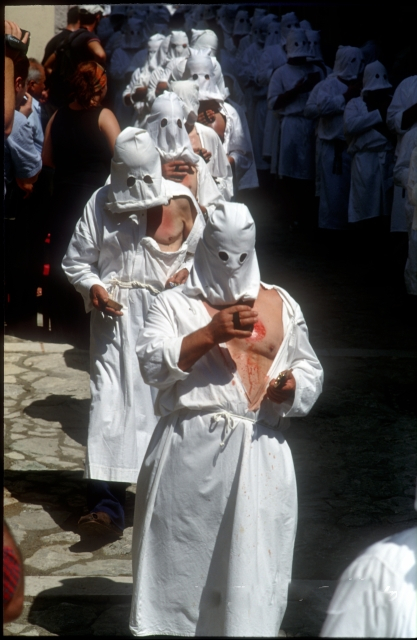
A confraternity of penitents in Italy mortifying the flesh with a spugna, an instrument of penance; capirote are worn by penitents so that attention is not drawn towards themselves as they repent, but rather to God.

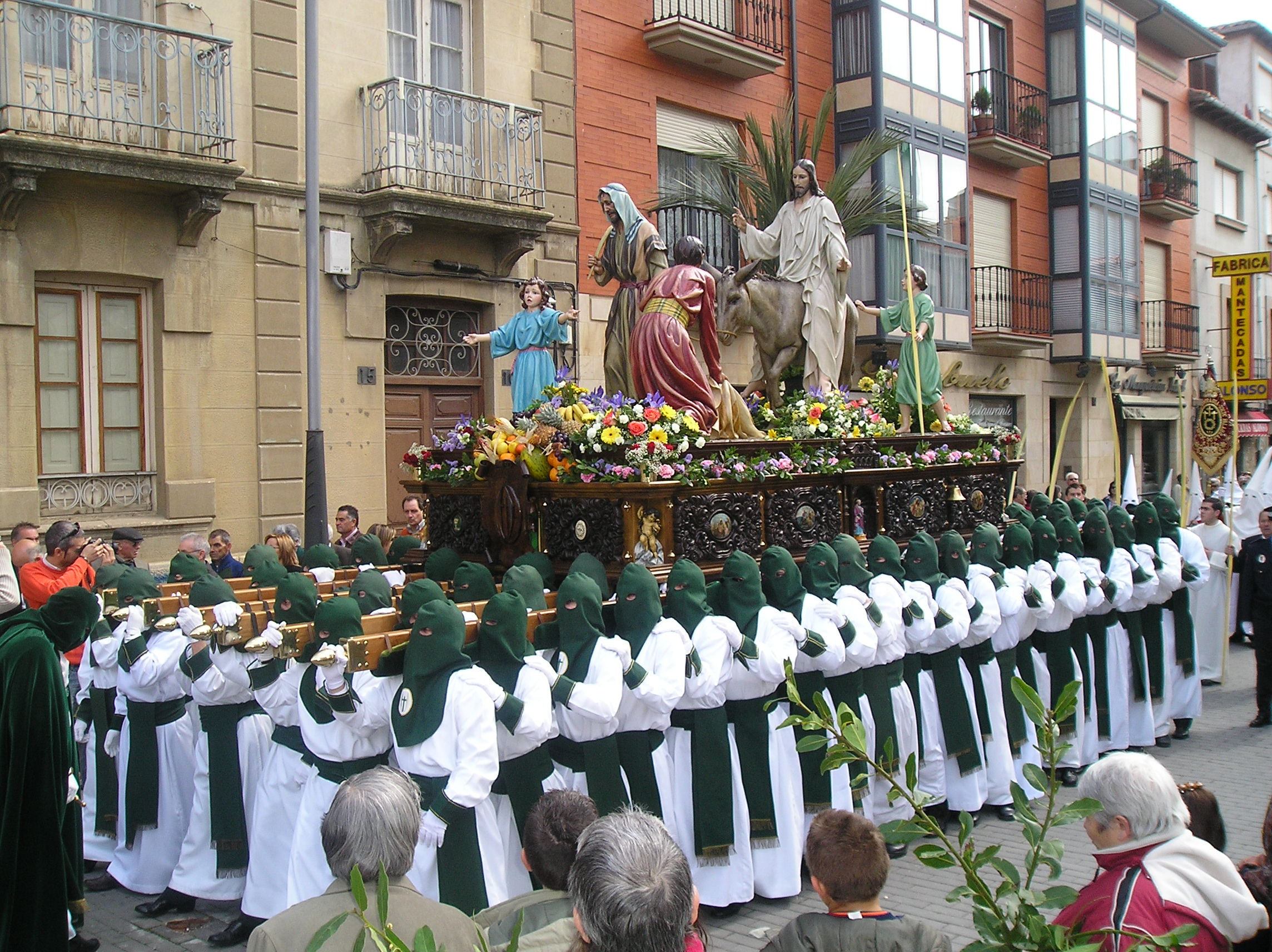
Confraternity of penitents in Astorga, Spain, leading a Palm Sunday procession

Confraternities of penitents (Spanish: Cofradía Penitencial; Italian: Fratellanza penitenziale; Portuguese: Irmandade Penitencial) are Christian religious congregations, with statutes prescribing various penitential works; they are especially popular in the Catholic Church. Members of the confraternities of penitents practice mortification of the flesh through fasting, the use of the discipline, the wearing of a hair shirt, among other instruments of penance, etc.

== Background ==
By the mid 12th century lay individuals practicing penance in central and northern Italy had begun to join in associations for mutual spiritual and material support. The converso was a layman who had made a "conversion of life" and was affiliated to a monastic order as a lay brother. "Penitents" were those who adopted asceticism. Gradually, the distinction blurred. They retained their personal property and worked to support themselves. They were not cloistered monastics. By 1210 some had, with clerical assistance, composed "rules" or forms of life. These rules generally proscribed blasphemy, gambling, haunting taverns, and womanizing. In 1227 Pope Gregory IX recognized and approved canonical status for groups he called "Brothers and Sisters of Penance". They observed the traditional fast of Wednesday and Saturday and St. Martin's Lent. This involved avoiding meat and dairy, and eating one meal a day, usually in the early afternoon. Those who could not fast were to provide food for a poor person for each day they themselves were dispensed from fasting. According to Augustine Thompson O.P., "Common penitential life and mutual fraternity gave the members their common identity, not some shared special devotion."

Most penitent confraternities took up some charitable activity. Around 1230, Florentine penitents established the Santa Maria Novella hospital. Over time, acts of charity began to replace the practice of self-flagellation. The Confraternity of Saint Lazarus in Marseille was founded in 1550 and undertook as its charitable work the maintenance of a local leper hospital. Confraternities were actively involved in their communities.

Penitential confraternities developed in Italy and had spread to France by the end of the fifteenth century. Andrew E. Barnes describes Penitential Confraternities as initially "small exclusive associations for urban male elites, distinctive both for their robes and hoods which cloaked their members' identities and for the independence from parochial interference which their status as protégés of the mendicant orders permitted.

The penitential confraternities were a phenomenon typical of southern France. In the sixteenth century they were established in the French cities, and by the seventeenth had gained momentum in rural area.

A degree of tension developed between the confraternities and the bishops as some members attended Mass in the confraternity chapel rather than the parish church. Some confraternities had their own chaplain, and even non-members would attend the shorter Masses, where no sermon was given, drawing a number of parishioners from the local church. Curés would complain that the penitents were conducting a parallel religious cult separate and in competition with the parish. The penitents "used the baroque spirituality of the Counter-Reformation, with its taste for display and collective activities, as an expression of communal religious devotion and vitality."

== History ==
The number of these confraternities increased to such a degree, Rome alone counting over a hundred, that the way of classifying them was according to the colour of the garb worn for processions and devotional exercises. This consisted of a heavy robe confined with a girdle, with a pointed hood concealing the face, the openings for the eyes permitting the wearer to see without being recognized.

=== White Penitents ===
The most important group of white penitents (who wear a white habit) is the Archconfraternity of the Gonfalone, established in 1264 at Rome. St. Bonaventure, at that time Inquisitor-general of the Holy Office, prescribed the rules, and the white habit, with the name Recommendati B. V. M. This confraternity was erected in the Church of St. Mary Major by Pope Clement IV in 1265, and four others having been erected in the Church of Santa Maria in Ara Coeli, was raised to the rank of an arch confraternity, to which the rest were aggregated. The headquarters were later moved to the Church of Santa Lucia del Gonfalone. The obligations of the members are to care for the sick, bury the dead, provide medical service for those unable to afford it, and give dowries to poor girls.

Other confraternities of white Penitents have included the Confraternity of White Penitents in Montpellier, the Confraternity of the Blessed Sacrament of St. John Lateran and the Confraternity of the Blessed Sacrament and of the Five Wounds at San Lorenzo in Damaso.

=== Black Penitents ===
The chief confraternity in this group is the Archconfraternity of the Misericordia. The Confraternity of the Misericordia was founded in Florence around 1240 for the purpose of assisting the ill, the imprisoned, and burying the dead. It took the city's patron, John the Baptist, as its own. A second branch was established in Rome at the church of San Giovanni Battista Decollato (St. John the Baptist Beheaded). From this, it was also known as the Confraternity of St. John the Beheaded. In 1488 it became an Archconfraternity. In 1540, it was given the right to annually, on July 29, (the feast of the Beheading of St. John), designate one condemned individual to be set free.

The confrerie de la Misericorde were established in Lyon, Avignon, and many other French and Belgian towns. They assist and console criminals condemned to death, accompany them to the gallows, and provide for them religious services and Christian burial.

The Royal Arch-Confraternity of Our Lord Jesus Christ (La Sanch) was formed in Perpignan. Its primary task was to attend and assist the convicts in their final hour and to provide for their burial.

The Archconfraternity of Death provides burial and religious services for the poor and those found dead within the limits of the Roman Campagna. Other confraternities of Black Penitents are the Confraternity of the Crucifix of St. Marcellus and the Confraternity of Jesus and Mary of St. Giles.

=== Blue Penitents ===
Originating in Italy, such as those of St. Julian in Monte Giordano, Madonna del Giardino, Santa Maria in Caccaberi, these confraternities were later established in Spain and France, the largest being in Nice and Toulouse. Dedicated to the Virgin Mary and inspired by Franciscan principles, their robes often bore the image of Saint Jerome. Penitents Bleus were required to pray each morning five Our Fathers and five Hail Marys. Their statutes urged members to generously assist the poor and sick in the hospitals, prisons, and elsewhere, and to give alms to orphaned apprentices or at least contribute to the almoners. The most public of devotions were the processions that occurred on Holy Thursday and Corpus Christi.

=== Grey Penitents ===
This includes, besides the Stigmati of St. Francis, the confraternities of St. Rose of Viterbo, The Holy Cross of Lucca, St. Rosalia of Palermo, St. Bartholomew, St. Alexander, etc.

=== Red Penitents ===
Embracing the confraternities of Sts. Ursula and Catherine, the red robe being confined with a green cincture; St. Sebastian and St. Valentine, with a blue cincture; and the Quattro Coronati, with a white cincture, etc. Their main purpose was to pray for those condemned to death.

=== Violet Penitents ===
The confraternity of the Blessed Sacrament at the Church of St. Andrea della Fratte, under the patronage of St. Francis of Paola. They were also active in Limoges.

=== Green Penitents ===
Including the confraternities of St. Rocco and St. Martin at Ripetto, the care of the poor and the sick.

There are many other confraternities which cannot be comprised within any of these groups, because of the combination of colours in their habits. The various confraternities were well represented in France from the thirteenth century on, reaching, perhaps, their most flourishing condition in the sixteenth century.

== Present day ==
=== Saint Francis Third Order Confraternity of Penitents ===
The Saint Francis Third Order Confraternity of Penitents is a private association of the faithful in the Franciscan tradition following the AD 1221 Rule of Saint Francis. The charism of the Saint Francis Third Order Confraternity of Penitents is "to assist the penitent in surrendering his or her life totally to God’s Divine Will as manifested through the teachings of Christ, the authority of the Church and the working of the Holy Spirit in the penitent’s life." Its membership is open to baptized Catholic Christians, though baptized Christians of other denominations may join as Associates; those seeking to join undergo a formation process. As of 2016, there were around 225 penitents attached to the Saint Francis Third Order Confraternity of Penitents.

=== Others ===
There are several confraternities of penitents active today in various parts of the world, such as the Cofradía Penitencial de Nuestro Padre Jesús Nazareno and the Cofradía Penitencial de Nuestro Padre Jesús Nazareno de Palencia, among many others.

== See also ==
- Penitentes (New Mexico), where they are still active
- Penitent bands, groups in Methodism that meet to confess sins
- Flagellant Confraternities (Central Italy)
- Saint-Jérôme Church in Toulouse
