= Discipline (instrument of penance) =

Instrument of physical penance in some Christian denominations

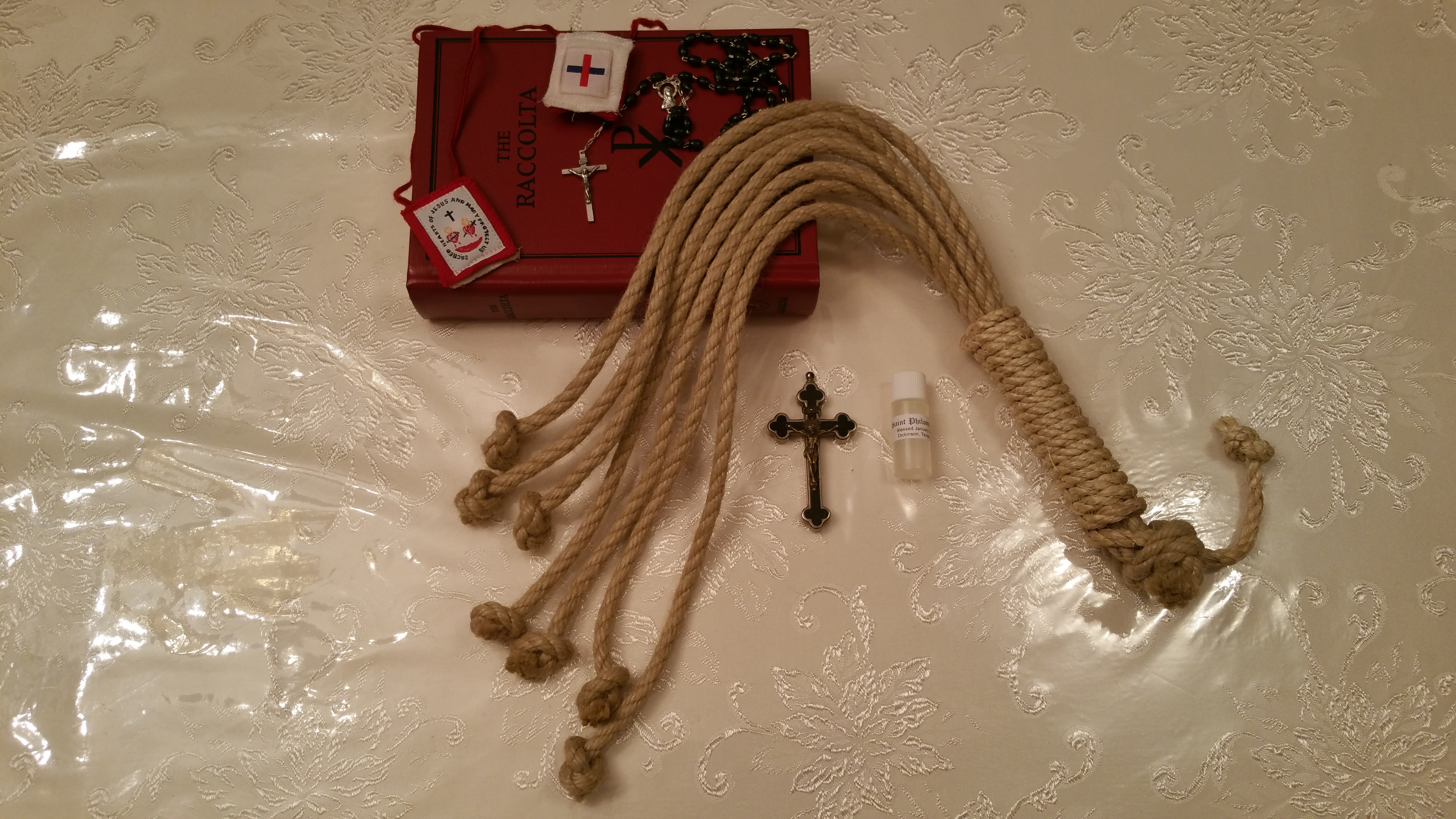
A discipline with seven cords lying on top of the Raccolta, a Catholic prayer book containing several acts of reparation, and other devotions. Beside it are several sacramentals: a rosary, the Fivefold Scapular, a crucifix, and a phial of holy oil of Saint Philomena.

A discipline is a small scourge (whip) used as an instrument of penance by certain members of some Christian denominations (including Roman Catholics, Lutherans, Anglicans, among others) in the spiritual discipline known as mortification of the flesh.

Many disciplines are composed of seven cords, symbolizing the seven deadly sins and seven virtues. They also often contain three knots on each cord, representing the number of days Jesus Christ remained in the tomb after bearing the sins of humanity. Those who use the discipline often do so during the penitential season of Lent, but others use it on other occasions, and even every day.

== History and practice ==
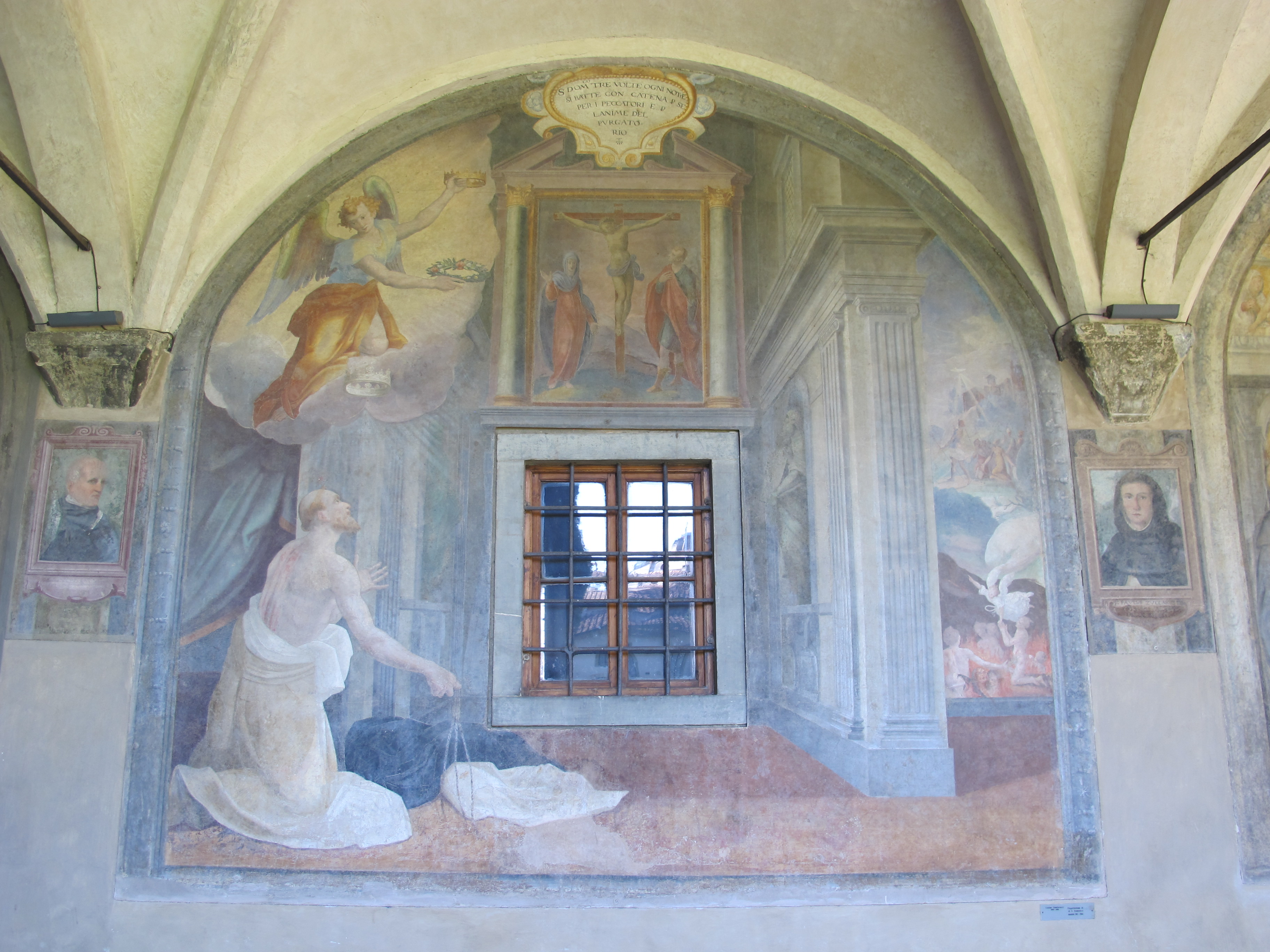
Fresco in the Basilica of Santa Maria Novella showing Saint Dominic with a discipline in his hand, kneeling before a crucifix

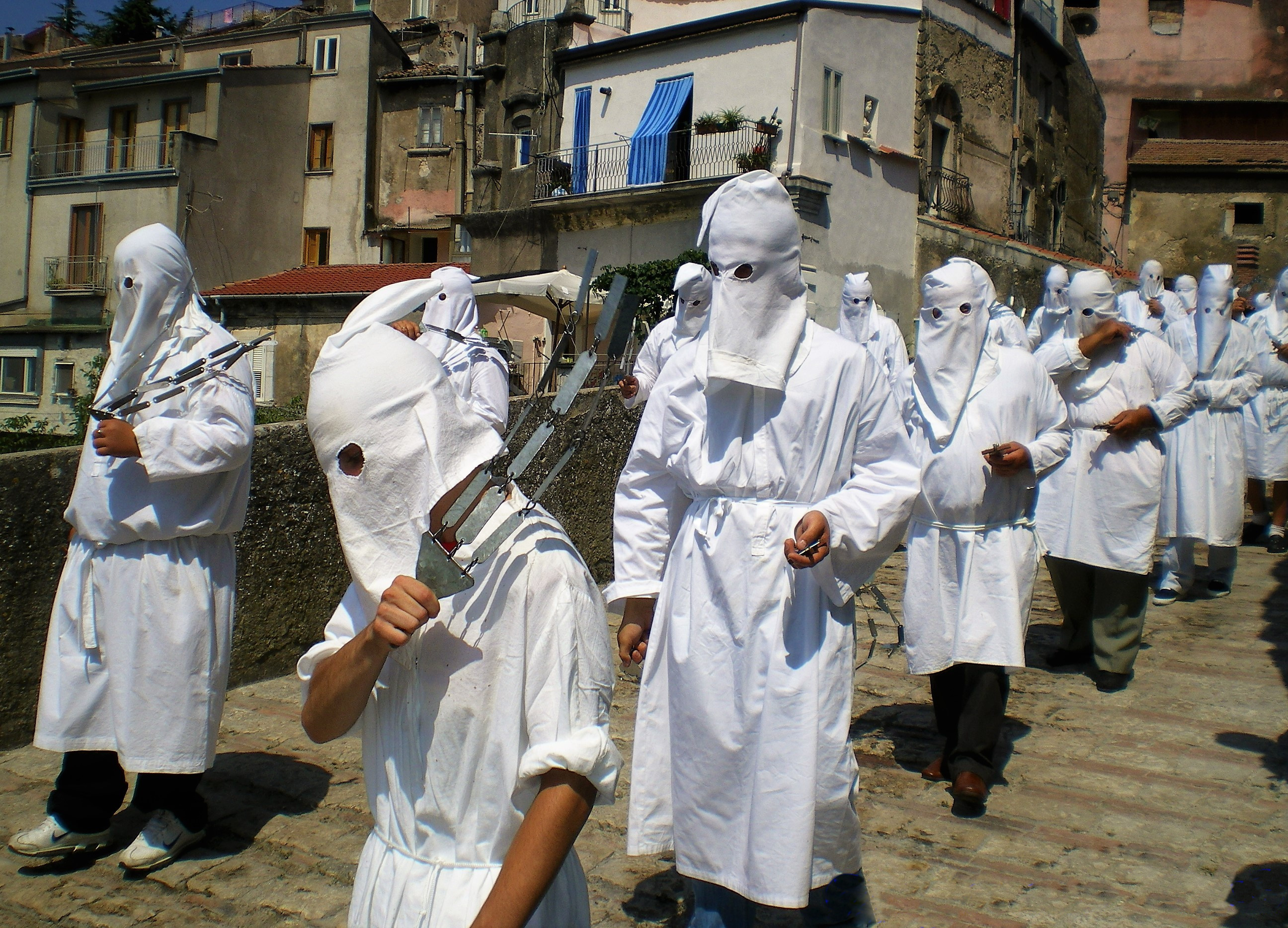
A confraternity of penitents in Italy mortifying the flesh with disciplines in a seven-hour procession; capirote are worn by penitents so that attention is not drawn towards themselves as they repent.

In the Bible, Saint Paul writes: "I punish my body and enslave it, so that after proclaiming to others I myself should not be disqualified" (1 Corinthians 9:27 NRSV). Christians who use the discipline do so as a means of partaking in the mortification of the flesh to aid in the process of sanctification; they also "inflict agony on themselves in order to suffer as Christ and the martyrs suffered." In antiquity and during the Middle Ages, when Christian monastics would mortify the flesh as a spiritual discipline, the name of the object that they used to practice this also became known as the discipline. By the 11th century, the use of the discipline for Christians who sought to practice the mortification of the flesh became ubiquitous throughout Christendom.

In the Roman Catholic Church, the discipline is used by some austere Catholic religious orders. The Cistercians, for example, use the discipline to mortify their flesh after praying Compline. The Capuchins have a ritual observed thrice a week, in which the psalms Miserere Mei Deus and De Profundis are recited as the friars flagellate themselves with a discipline. Saints such as Dominic Loricatus, Mary Magdalene de' Pazzi, among others, have used the discipline on themselves to aid in their sanctification.

Votarists of some Lutheran religious orders and Anglican religious orders practice self-flagellation with a discipline. Martin Luther, the German Reformer, practiced mortification of the flesh through fasting and self-flagellation while still a monk, even sleeping in a stone cell without a blanket. Within Anglicanism, the use of the discipline became "quite common" among many members of the Tractarian movement. Congregationalist writer and leader within the evangelical Christian movement, Sarah Osborn, practiced self-flagellation in order "to remind her of her continued sin, depravity, and vileness in the eyes of God".

== See also ==
- Conditional preservation of the saints
- Repentance (Christianity)
- Sackcloth
