= Dominic Loricatus =

Italian Roman Catholic saint

Saint Dominic Loricatus, O.S.B. Cam.
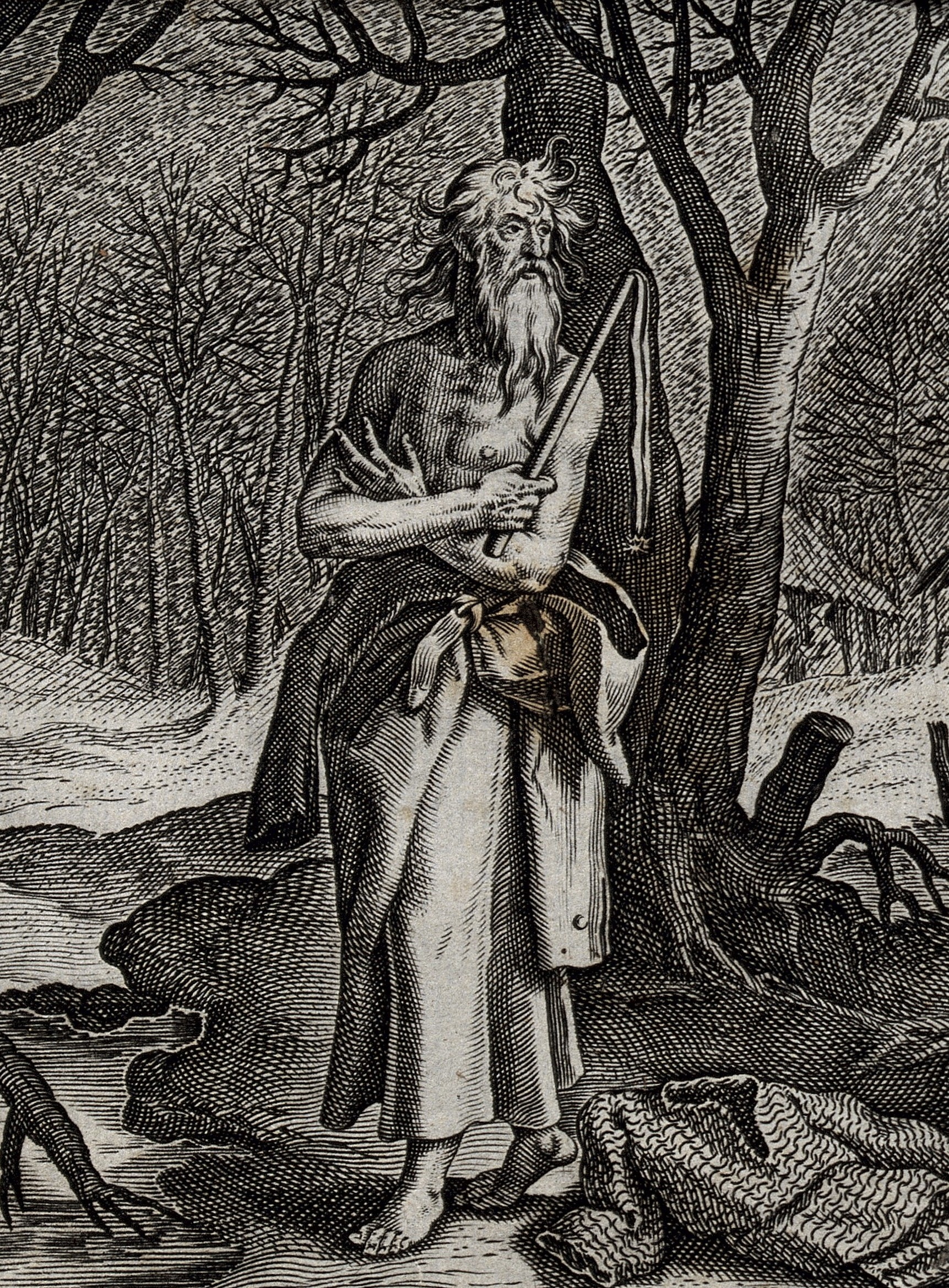
- Born: 995; Luceolis, Duchy of Spoleto
- Died: 1060; Poggio San Vicino, Marche of Camerino
- Venerated in: Roman Catholicism (Camaldolese Order)
- Feast: October 14
- Attributes: his coat of mail lying on the ground

Dominic Loricatus, O.S.B. Cam. (Italian: San Domenico Loricato; 995 - 1060) was an Italian monk known for his extraordinary penitential self-mortification.

== Biography ==
According to the Catholic Encyclopedia,

[Loricatus] was born about the year 990 and was destined for the priesthood by his parents, who bribed a bishop to ordain him before the canonical age. After living for a few years as a secular priest, he was struck with contrition for the sin of simony to which he had been a party and became a monk. This was probably at the hermitage of Luceoli, as we are told that he placed himself under the direction of John of Monte Feltro. Here he remained till about 1044, when, desiring to increase the severity of his penances, he came to Fonte-Avellana to be the disciple of St. Peter Damian. The record of his cuirass, he wore habitually iron rings and chains round his limbs, and loaded with this weight he daily prostrated himself a thousand times or recited whole psalters with arms extended in the form of a cross. Day and night he lacerated his body with a pair of scourges.

His vita was written by St. Peter Damian (at the request of Pope Alexander II), who admired him and called himself his "teacher and lord" (though some scholars refer to Dominic as Damian's "disciple"). Damian himself promoted penitential self-mortification. Dominic wore a mail shirt or lorica on his body as a kind of hairshirt, which gave rise to his name, Loricatus.

Dominic carried his scourge (possibly made of birch) with him at all time, flogging himself at bedtime. He is said to have performed these lashes while reciting the psalms, with 100 lashes for each psalm. 30 psalms (3000 strokes) made penance for one year of sin; the entire psalter redeemed 5 years, while 20 psalters (300,000 strokes) redeemed one hundred years. Dominic performed the "one hundred years penance" during Lent. The wounds he inflicted on himself were equated with the stigmata by Peter Damian: "Our Dominic, however, bore in body the stigmata of Jesus, and fixed the sign of the cross not only on his forehead, but printed it on every part of his body ... His whole life was for him a Good Friday crucifixion."

He died at the Hermitage of San Vicino, near San Severino Marche in 1060, where he had been appointed prior by Peter Damian the previous year, where his remains are still venerated. His feast is celebrated by the Camaldolese Order on October 14.

== Attributes and afterlife ==
Frederick Charles Husenbeth notes various elements: a coat of mail lying on the ground, or giving a coat of mail to a beggar.

The Glazier Collection in the Morgan Library & Museum holds an "Italian Sacramentary for the use of Sant'Apollinare in Classe, Ravenna", supposedly used by Peter Damian and Dominic Loricatus, and originally a "rather plain book". After Dominic's death it became a relic, and was given silver and ivory covers in the 12th century: "The silver work was, presumably, done in the twelfth century by south Italian smiths under strong Byzantine influence, and it incorporates earlier ivory plaques which came not from a book cover but from an ivory casket made during the early eleventh century in Italy on the model of similar Byzantine caskets. The book was for years in the church of Santa Anna of Frontale, but it disappeared and lay, during at least part of this time, in the Rütschi collection, Zurich."

His vigorous embrace of self-flagellation was discussed by Edward Gibbon in The History of the Decline and Fall of the Roman Empire, after introducing the church's calculation of penance:

By a fantastic arithmetic, a year of penance was taxed at three thousand lashes; and such was the skill and patience of a famous hermit, Saint Dominic of the iron Cuirass, that in six days he could discharge an entire century, by a whipping of three hundred thousand stripes. His example was followed by many penitents of both sexes; and, as a vicarious sacrifice was accepted, a sturdy disciplinarian might expiate on his own back the sins of his benefactors.

=== Vita ===
- Peter Damian, Vita Sancti Dominici Loricati (Life of St. Dominic Loricatus), in Jacques Paul Migne, Patrologia Latina, CXLIV
