= Self-flagellation =

Whipping oneself as part of a religious ritual

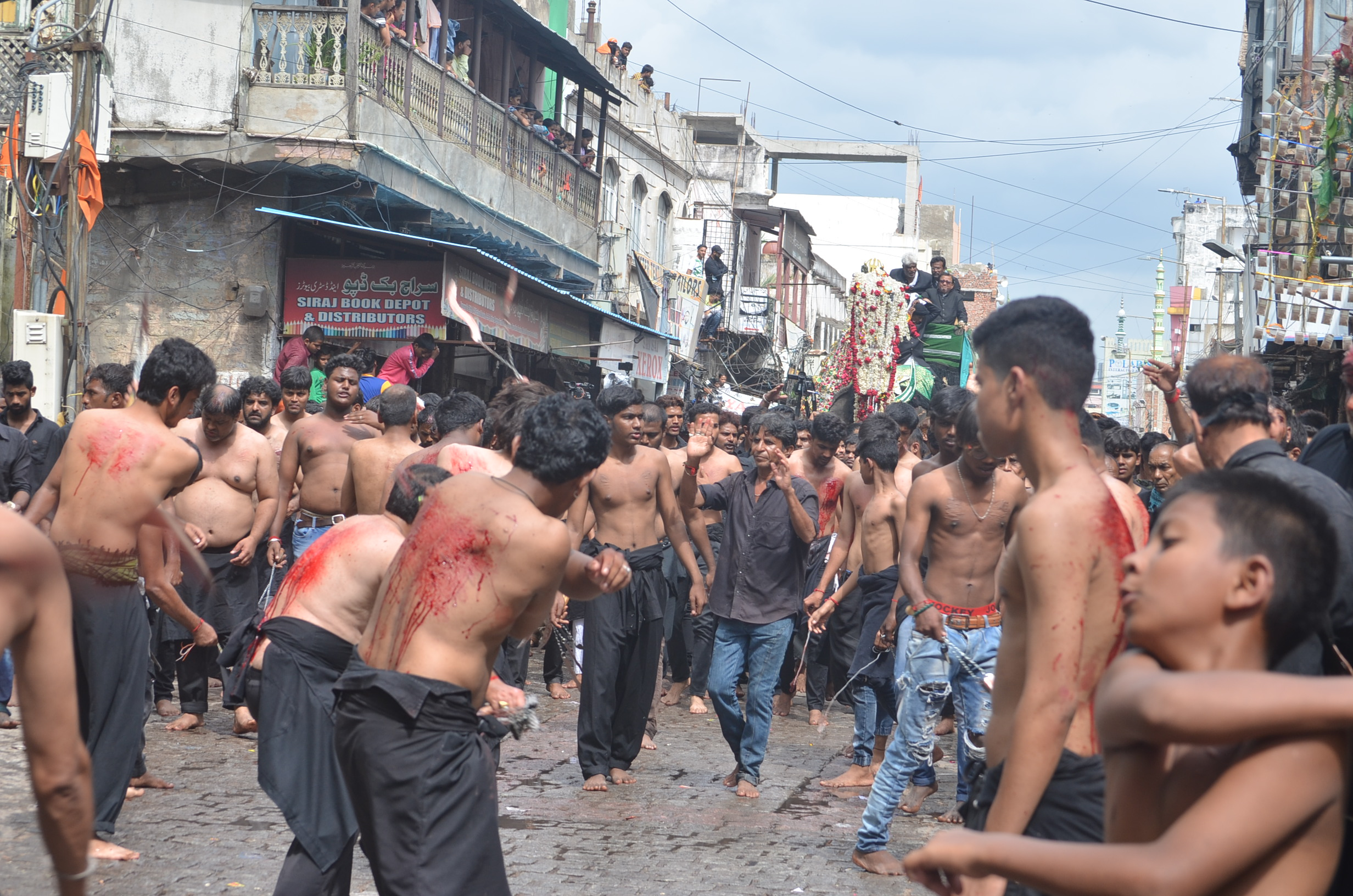
Shia Muslims mourning the martyrdom of Husayn ibn Ali in Hyderabad, India

Self-flagellation is the disciplinary and devotional practice of flogging oneself with whips or other instruments that inflict pain. In Christianity, self-flagellation is practiced in the context of the doctrine of the mortification of the flesh and is seen as a spiritual discipline. It is often used as a form of penance and is intended to allow the flagellant to share in the sufferings of Jesus, bringing their focus to God.

The main religions that practice self-flagellation include some branches of Christianity and Islam. The ritual has also been practiced among members of several Egyptian and Greco-Roman cults.

== Christianity ==
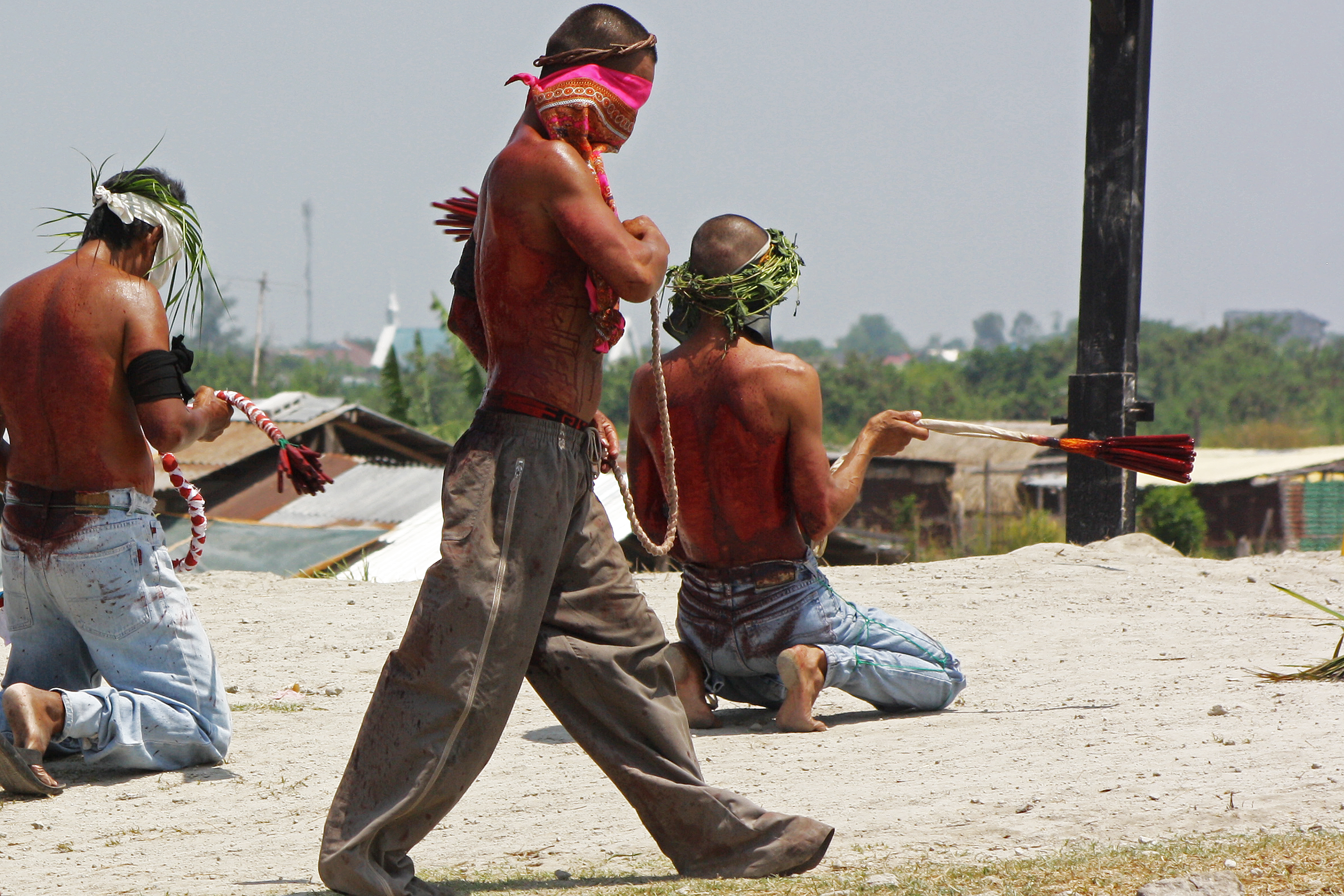
Magdarame (Kapampangan for 'penitents') during Holy Week in the Philippines

Historically, Christians have engaged in various forms of mortification of the flesh, ranging from self-denial, wearing hairshirts and chains, fasting, and self-flagellation (often using a type of whip called a discipline). Some Christians use excerpts from the Bible to justify this ritual. For example, some interpreters claim that Paul the Apostle's statement, "I chastise my body" (1 Corinthians 9:27), refers to self-inflicted bodily scourging. Prominent Christians who have practiced self-flagellation include Martin Luther, the Protestant Reformer, and Congregationalist writer Sarah Osborn, who practiced self-flagellation in order "to remind her of her continued sin, depravity, and vileness in the eyes of God". It became "quite common" for members of the Tractarian movement within the Anglican Communion to practice self-flagellation using a discipline.

In the 11th century, Peter Damian, a Benedictine monk in the Catholic tradition, taught that spirituality should manifest itself in physical discipline; he admonished those who sought to follow Christ to practice self-flagellation for the duration of the time it takes one to recite forty Psalms, increasing the number of flagellations on holy days of the Christian calendar. For Damian, only those who shared in the sufferings of Christ could be saved. Throughout Christian history, the mortification of the flesh, wherein one denies oneself physical pleasures, has been commonly followed by members of the clergy, especially in Christian monasteries and convents. Self-flagellation was imposed as a form of punishment as a means of penance for disobedient clergy and laity.

In the 13th century, a group of Catholics, known as the Flagellants, took this practice to extremes. During the Black Death, it was thought of as a way to combat the plague by cleansing one's sins. The Flagellants were condemned by the Catholic Church as a cult in 1349 by Pope Clement VI.

Self-flagellation rituals were also practiced in 16th-century Japan. Japanese of the time who were converted to Christianity by Jesuit missionaries were reported to have had sympathy for the Passion of the Christ, and they readily practiced self-flagellation to show their devotion. The earliest records of self-flagellation practiced by Japanese converts appeared in the year 1555 in the regions of Bungo and Hirado in Kyushu. These Japanese Christians wore crowns of thorns and bore crosses on their backs during the procession, which led to the place they had designated as the Mount of the Cross.

Christians give various reasons for choosing to self-flagellate. One of the main reasons is to emulate the suffering of Christ during his Passion. As Jesus was whipped before his crucifixion, many see whipping themselves as a way to be closer to Jesus and as a reminder of that whipping. Many early Christians believed that in order to be closer to God, one would need to literally suffer through the pain of Christ. Some of them interpret Paul the Apostle as alluding to inflicting bodily harm in order to feel closer to God in his letters to the Romans and to the Colossians.

Self-flagellation was also seen as a form of purification, purifying the soul as repentance for any worldly indulgences. Self-flagellation is also used as a punishment on earth in order to avoid punishment in the next life. Self-flagellation was also seen as a way to control the body in order to focus only on God. By whipping oneself, one would find distraction from the pleasures of the world and be able to fully focus on worshiping God. Self-flagellation is also done to thank God for responding to a prayer or to drive evil spirits from the body (cf. Exorcism in Christianity). The popularity of self-flagellation has abated, with some pious Christians choosing to practice the mortification of the flesh with acts like fasting or abstaining from a pleasure (cf. Lenten sacrifice).

There is a debate within the Christian tradition about whether or not self-flagellation is of spiritual benefit, with various religious leaders and Christians condemning the practice and others, such as Pope John Paul II, having practiced self-flagellation. People who self-flagellate believe that they need to spiritually share in the suffering of Jesus, and continue this practice, both publicly and privately. The practice of self-flagellation has been used amongst members of Opus Dei.

== Judaism ==
Some Jewish men practice a symbolic form of self-flagellation on the day before Yom Kippur as an enactment; it is strictly prohibited in Judaism to cause self-harm. Biblical passages such as "it shall be a holy convocation unto you; and ye shall afflict your souls" (Leviticus 23:27) were used to justify these actions. It was a common practice in the Middle Ages for men to whip themselves on the back 39 times. However, since biblical times Judaism has largely considered Yom Kippur as a day of spiritual atonement achieved through fasting, introspection, and other interpretations of the commandment "afflict your souls" that do not involve bodily self-harm.

== Islam ==
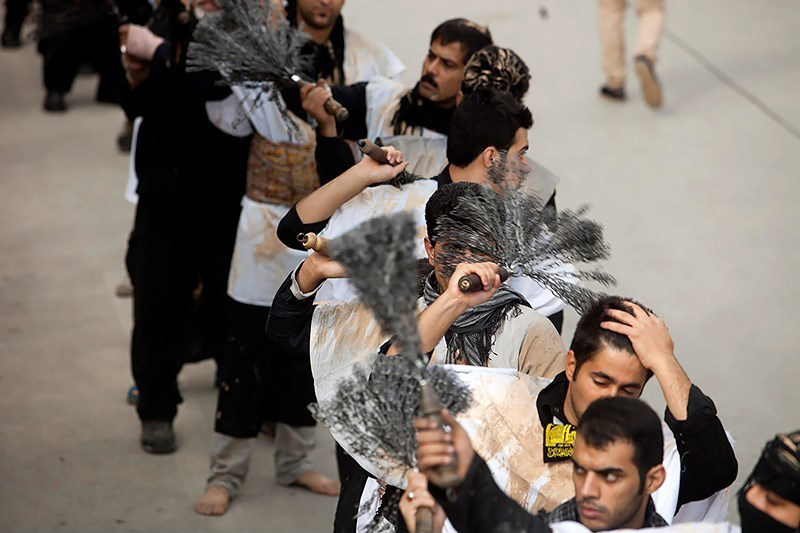
Zanjerzani in Iran

The practice of self flagellation among certain sects of Islam is called matam (in Iran and South Asia) and latm (in the Arab world). Matam is performed by some members of Shia Islam (particularly the Twelver Shia community) to honor Imam Husain, a martyr in the Battle of Karbala (in what is now Iraq) and grandson of the prophet Muhammad. The flagellants are called matamdar. They often do so while chanting "Ya Husayn".

Devotees perform this act by beating their chest, hitting themselves with blades, chains, or other sharp objects. A trancelike state can be achieved when pain is inflicted rhythmically. These rituals are typically accompanied by poetry and percussive elements; the rhythm structures the altered state. The practice is sometimes called "somatopsychic", as opposed to psychosomatic, based on the idea that it begins in the body, then migrates to the mind.

This ritual of matam is meant to reaffirm one's faith and relationships by creating a deep bond among the participants through their shared religious devotion. Despite the violent nature of this ritual, the love and vulnerability associated with it makes it an affirmational ritual performance.

Self-flagellation is just as controversial in Islam as it is in Christianity. In 2008, a prominent court case involving a resident of the UK town of Eccles, who was accused of encouraging his children to self-flagellate, provoked widespread condemnation of the practice. Shias responded by affirming that children should not be encouraged to self-harm, but defending the importance of the ritual when performed by consenting adults. However, some Shia leaders fear that the practice gives their religion a bad reputation, and recommend donating blood instead.

== See also ==
- Autosadism
