= Spugna =

Christian instrument of penance

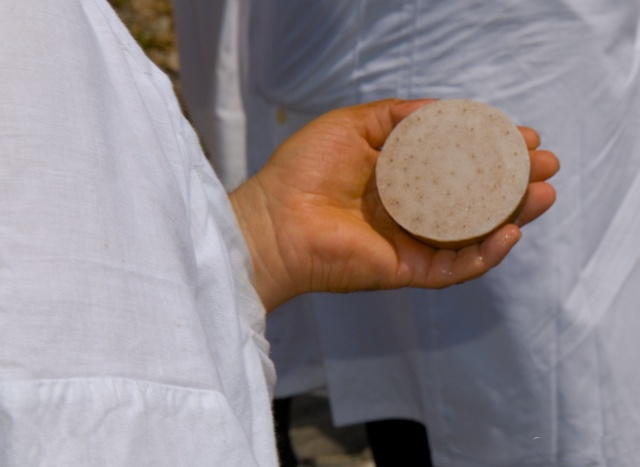
Spugna

A spugna is an instrument of penance used by some Christians who practice mortification of the flesh. With the word "spugna" literally meaning "sponge", a spugna is made from a circular piece of cork that contains metal studs, metal spikes, or needles. Christians, especially those who are enrolled in a confraternity of penitents, strike the spugna against their chests to repent of sins and to share in the Passion of Christ. Spugna are used in the privacy of one's dwelling, as well as in public Christian processions. When in public, beaters (battenti) cover their faces with capiroti (singular capirote) in order not to draw attention to themselves as they repent, but to God; these include men, women and children. As those using the spugna sometimes bleed, white wine is poured on top of the spugna to cleanse it and protect the wound from infection.

== Gallery ==
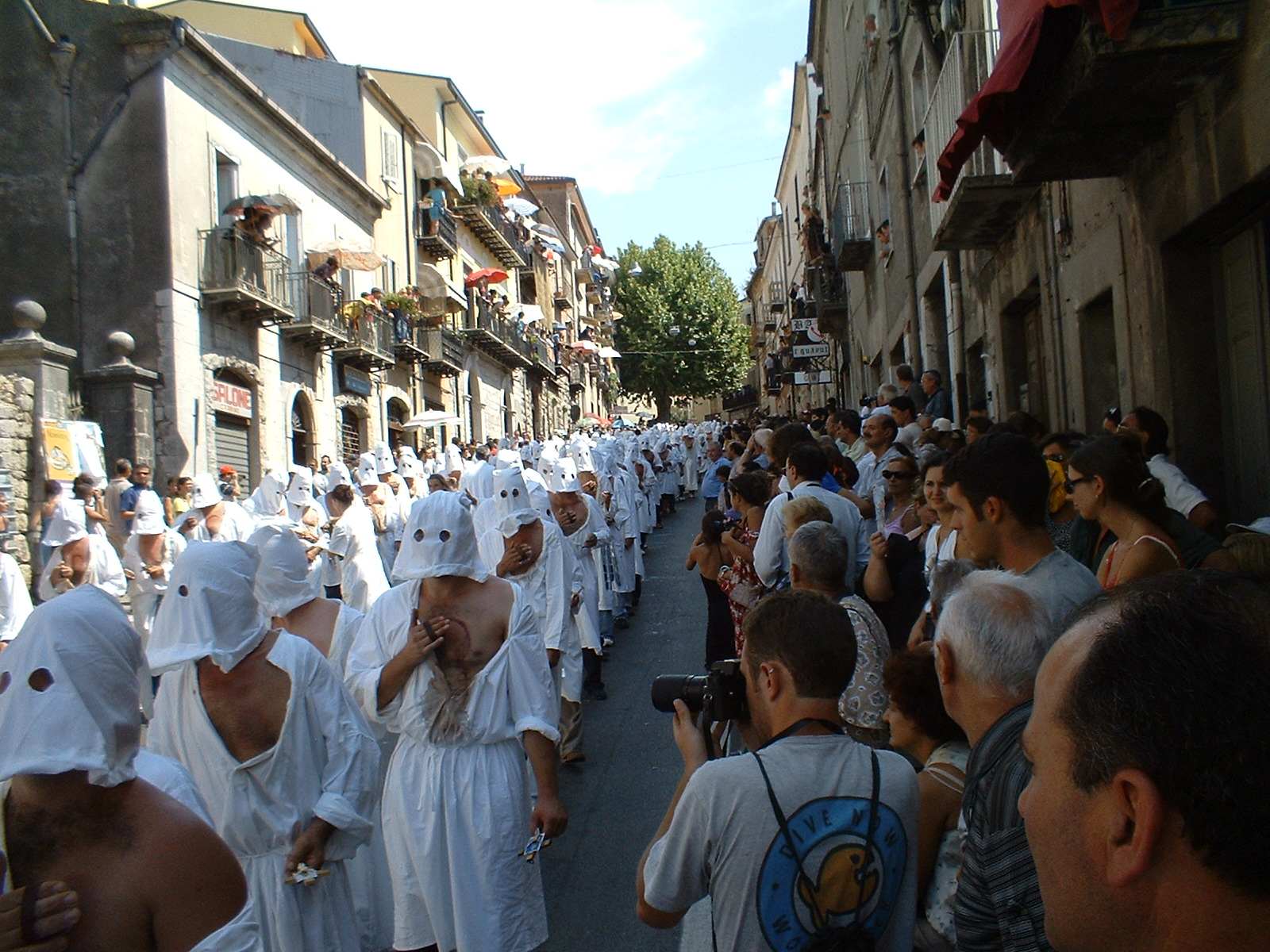
A Christian procession with penitents mortifying the flesh with spugnas in the Italian city of Guardia Sanframondi

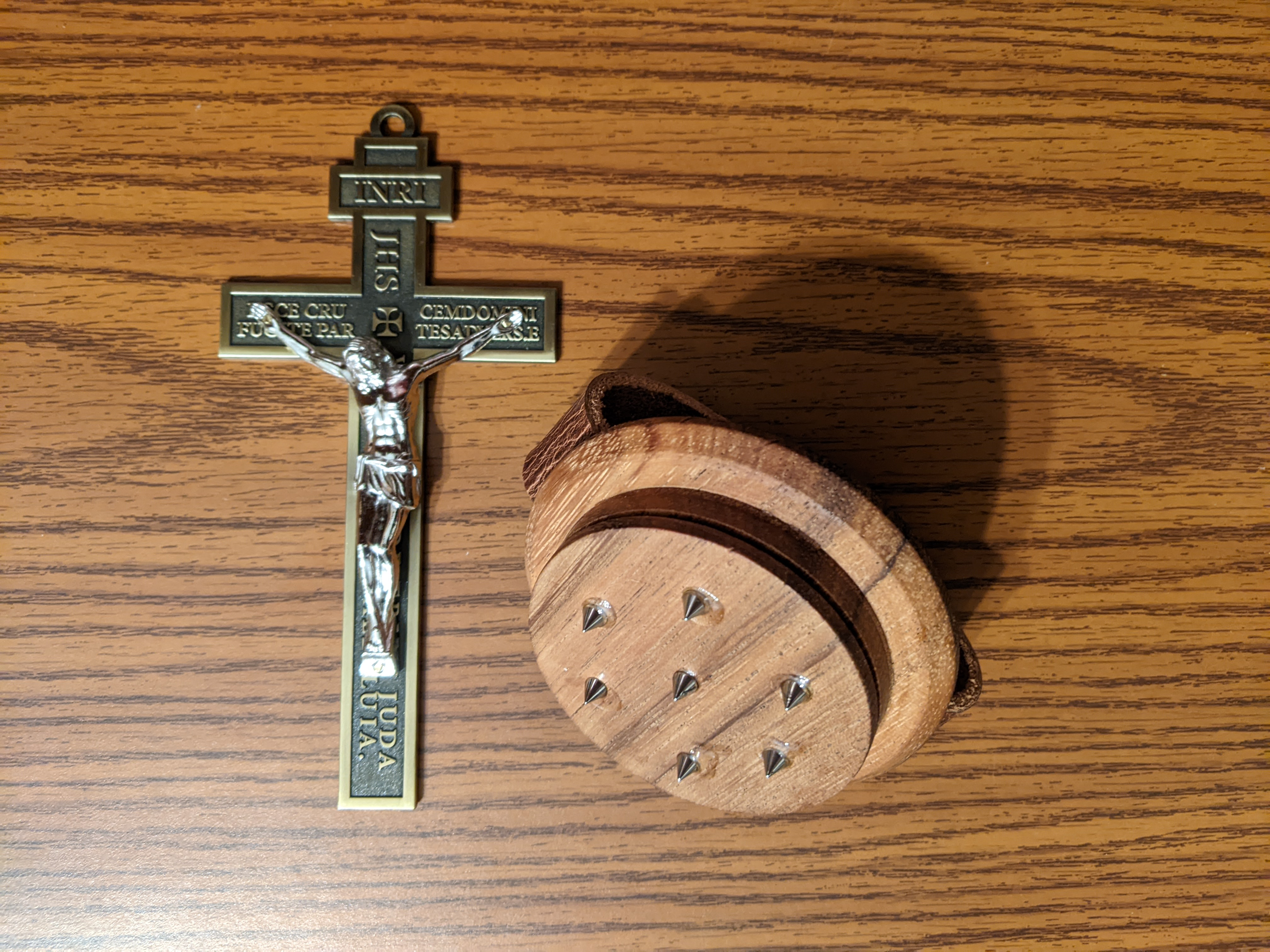
A spugna with seven metal studs, symbolizing the seven deadly sins and the seven capital virtues

== See also ==
- Instruments of penance
- Confraternities of the Cord
- Purity ring
