= Mortification of the flesh =

Act by which an individual or group seeks to deaden their sinful nature

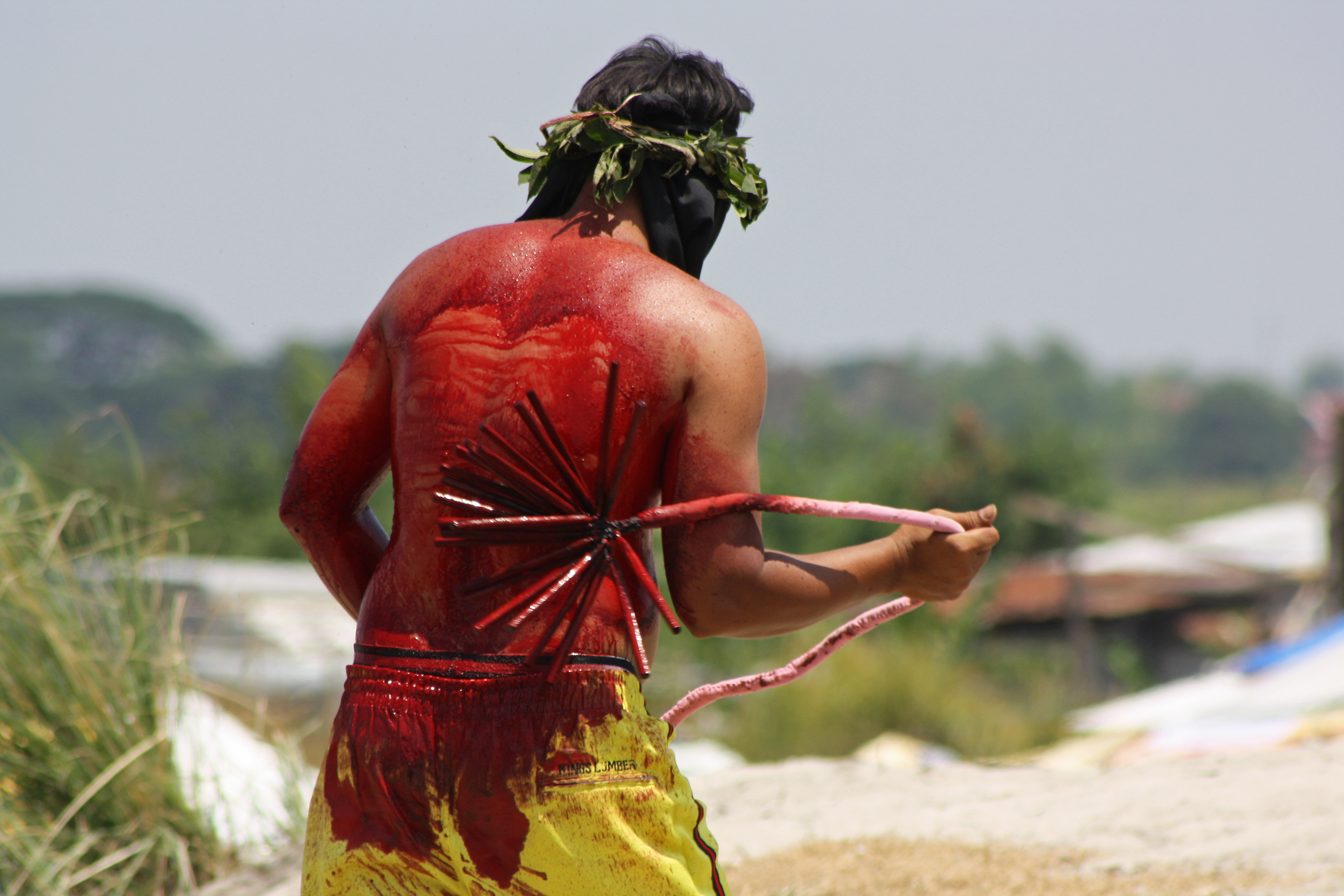
A penitent flagellates himself with a discipline during the San Pedro Cutud Lenten Rites

Mortification of the flesh is an act by which an individual or group seeks to mortify or deaden their sinful nature, as a part of the process of sanctification.

In Christianity, mortification of the flesh is undertaken in order to repent for sins and share in the Passion of Jesus. Common forms of Christian mortification that are practiced to this day include fasting, abstinence, as well as pious kneeling. Also common among Christian religious orders in the past were the wearing of sackcloth, as well as self-flagellation in imitation of Jesus Christ's suffering and death. Christian theology holds that the Holy Spirit helps believers in the "mortification of the sins of the flesh." Verses in the Old Testament (Hebrew Bible) considered to be precursors to Christian ideas of self-mortification include Zechariah 13:6 and 1 Kings 18:28–29.

Although the term mortification of the flesh, which is derived from the King James version of Romans 8:13 and Colossians 3:5, is primarily used in a Christian context, other cultures may have analogous concepts of self-denial; secular practices exist as well.

== Christianity ==
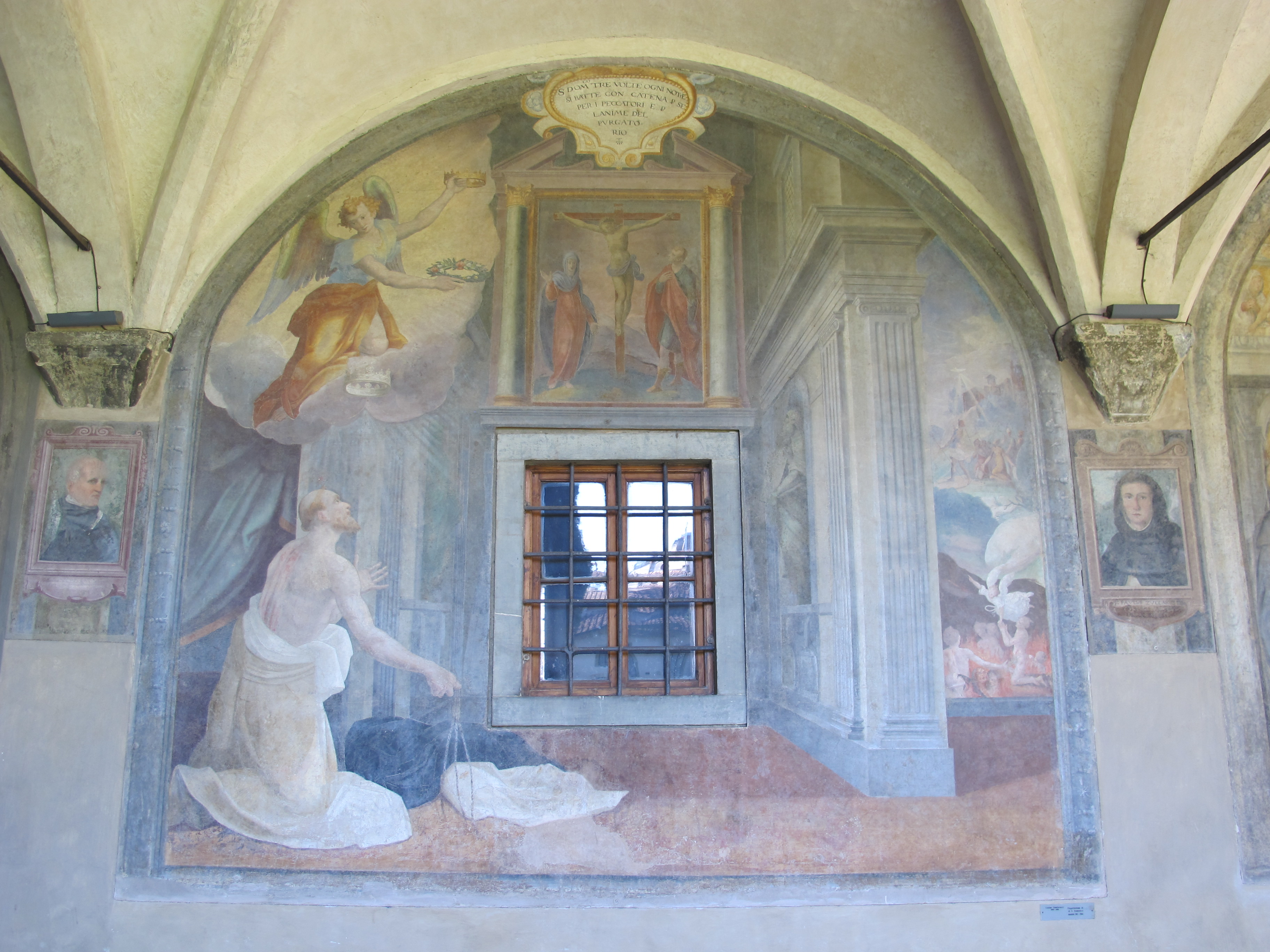
Fresco in the Basilica of Santa Maria Novella showing Saint Dominic with a discipline in his hand, kneeling before a crucifixion scene

=== Etymology ===
The term mortification of the flesh comes from the Book of Romans 8:13 in the New Testament: "For if you live according to the flesh you will die, but if by the Spirit you put to death the deeds of the body you will live." The same idea is seen in other verses, such as Colossians 3:5 ("Put to death what is earthly in you: fornication, impurity, passion, evil desire, and covetousness, which is idolatry") and Galatians 5:24 ("And those who belong to Christ Jesus have crucified the flesh with its passions and desires"). Support for such behavior in the Old Testament is found in some verses such as Proverbs 20:30: "Blows that wound cleanse away evil; strokes make clean the innermost parts."

According to Christian exegesis, "deeds of the body" and "what is earthly" refer to the "wounded nature" of man or his concupiscence (evil inclinations as a consequence of the Fall of Man); humanity suffers the consequences of the original sin through temptation to sin. The Apostle Paul, who authored Romans, expected believers to "put to death" the deeds of the flesh. The word for 'flesh' in Koine Greek, the language in which the New Testament was originally written, is sarx (σάρξ), a word denoting the fallen or sinful elements, parts, and proclivities of humanity. This word is juxtaposed in Romans 8:13 with the term used for 'body' (σῶμα), which more strictly refers to the physical body of a human. Thus in Romans 8:13, Paul draws a parallel between fallen people, with proclivities to sin without chance of redemption, and redeemed people, who are so changed that mortification of their fleshly sin can turn to bodily life, from σάρξ to σῶμα.

=== Forms of mortification ===
In its simplest form, mortification of the flesh can mean merely denying oneself certain pleasures, such as permanently or temporarily abstaining (i.e. fasting), from meat, alcoholic beverages, sexual relations, or an area of life that makes the person's spiritual life more difficult or burdensome. It can also be practiced by choosing a simple or even impoverished lifestyle; this is often one reason many monastics of various Christian denominations take vows of poverty. Among votarists, traditional forms of physical mortification are chain cilices and hair-shirts. In some of its more severe forms, it can mean using a discipline to flagellate oneself and a spugna to beat oneself.

=== Purposes ===
Mortification of the flesh is undertaken by Christians in order to repent of sins and share in the Passion of Jesus.

Through the centuries, some Christians have practiced voluntary penances as a way of imitating Jesus who, according to the New Testament, voluntarily accepted the sufferings of his passion and death on the cross at Calvary in order to redeem humankind. Jesus also fasted for 40 days and 40 nights, an example of submission to the first person of the Trinity, God the Father, and as a way of preparing for ministry.

The early Christians mortified the flesh through martyrdom and through what has been called "confession of the faith": accepting torture in a joyful way. As Christians experienced persecution, they often embraced their fate of suffering due to their love for Christ and the transformation they said they experienced from following him; these individuals became martyrs of the Christian faith. St. Jerome, a Western church father and biblical scholar who translated the Bible into Latin (the Vulgate), was famous for his severe penances in the desert and his propagation of Christian asceticism including from his base in Palestine.

=== Instruments of penance ===
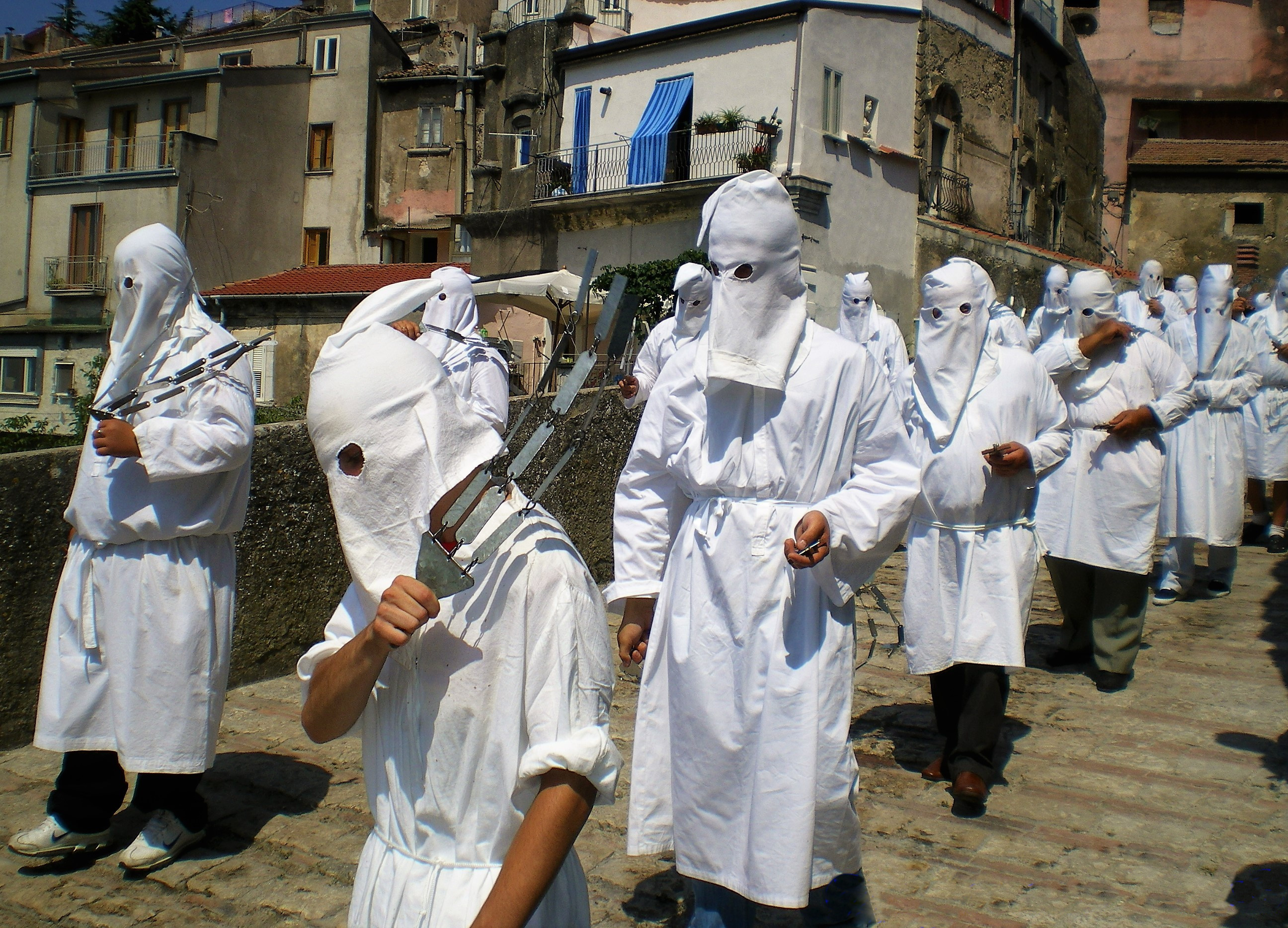
A confraternity of penitents in Italy mortifying the flesh with disciplines in a seven-hour procession; penitents wear capirote so that attention is not drawn toward themselves as they repent but rather to God.

Christians practicing mortification of the flesh often use instruments of penance as they repent, with the purpose of being contrite and sharing in the suffering of Jesus. These include the following:

- Discipline, a scourge usually having seven tails (representing the seven deadly sins and seven virtues) for self-flagellation of the back
- Hairshirt, a garment made of camel's hair or sackcloth worn to cause the Christian mild discomfort
- Chain cilice, a wire chain worn around the legs to cause the penitent mild discomfort
- Spugna, a round cork containing metal studs, metal spikes, or needles that is used to beat one's chest
- Cross, which is carried in the imitation of Christ, especially in Lenten processions
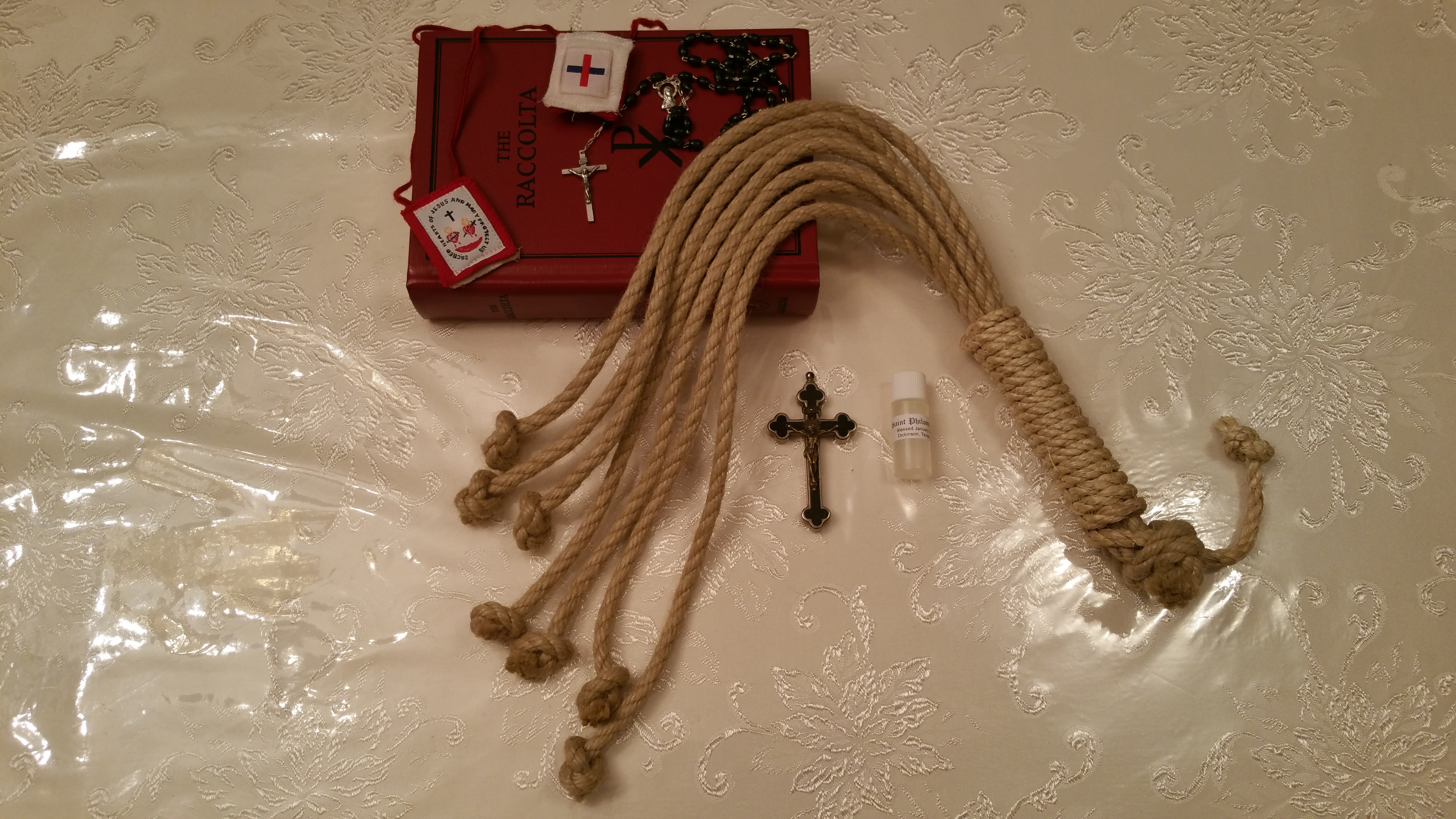
Discipline

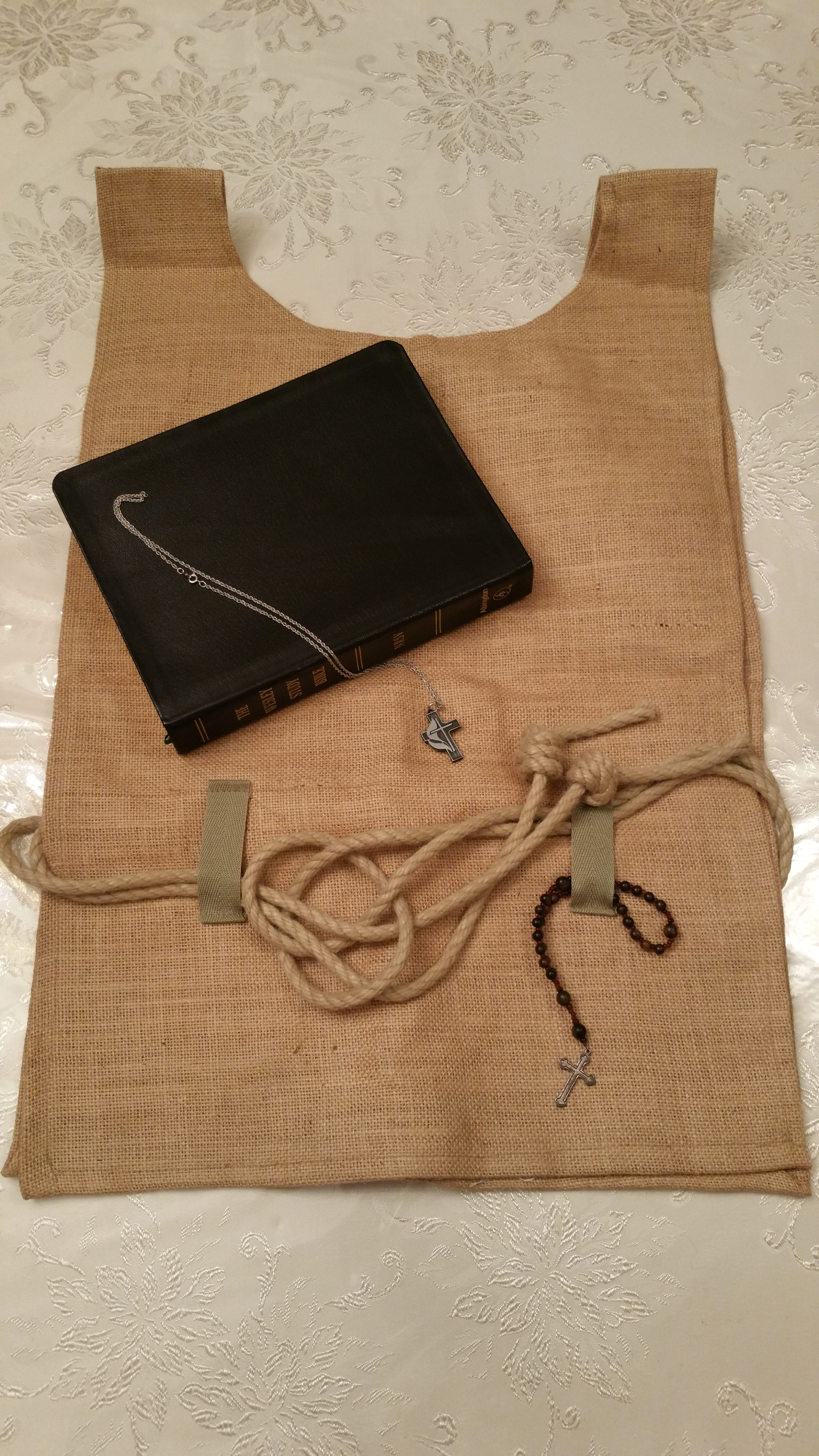
Hairshirt

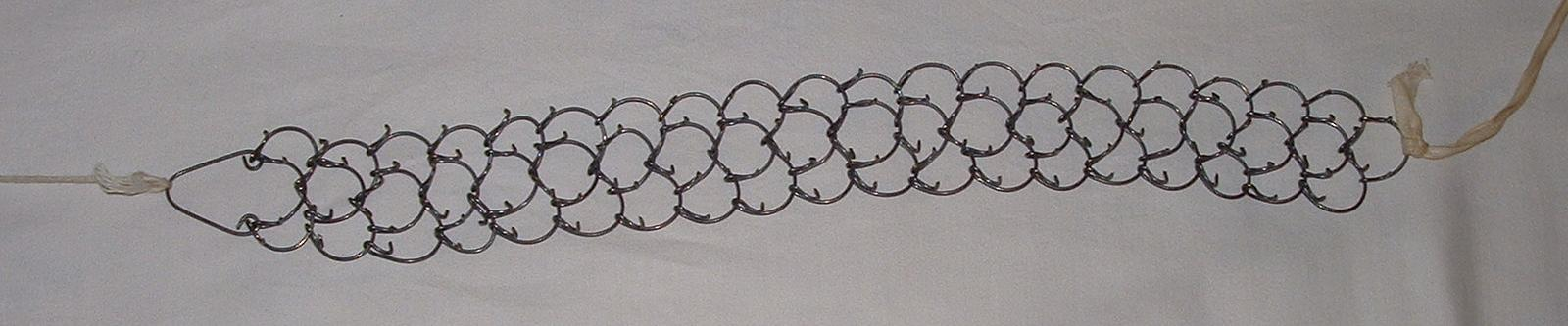
Chain Cilice

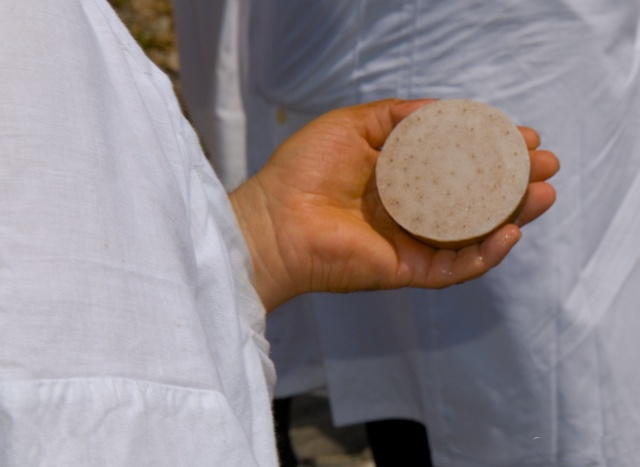
Spugna

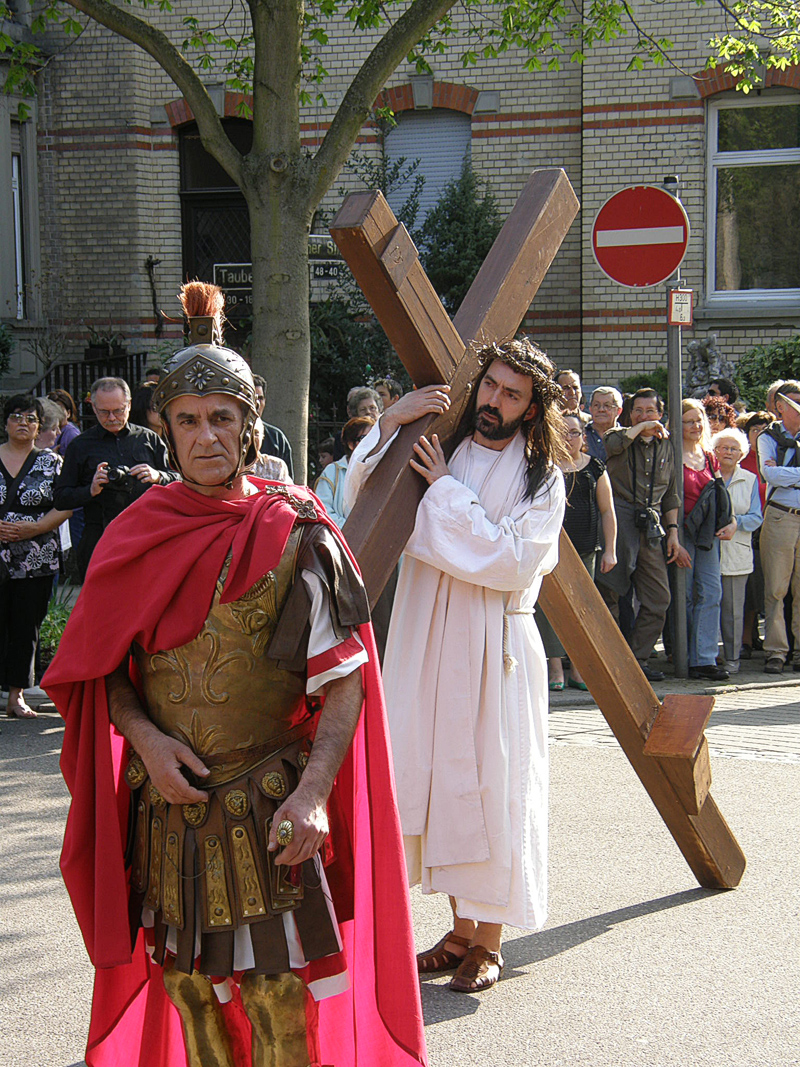
Cross

=== Denominational practices ===
==== Catholicism ====
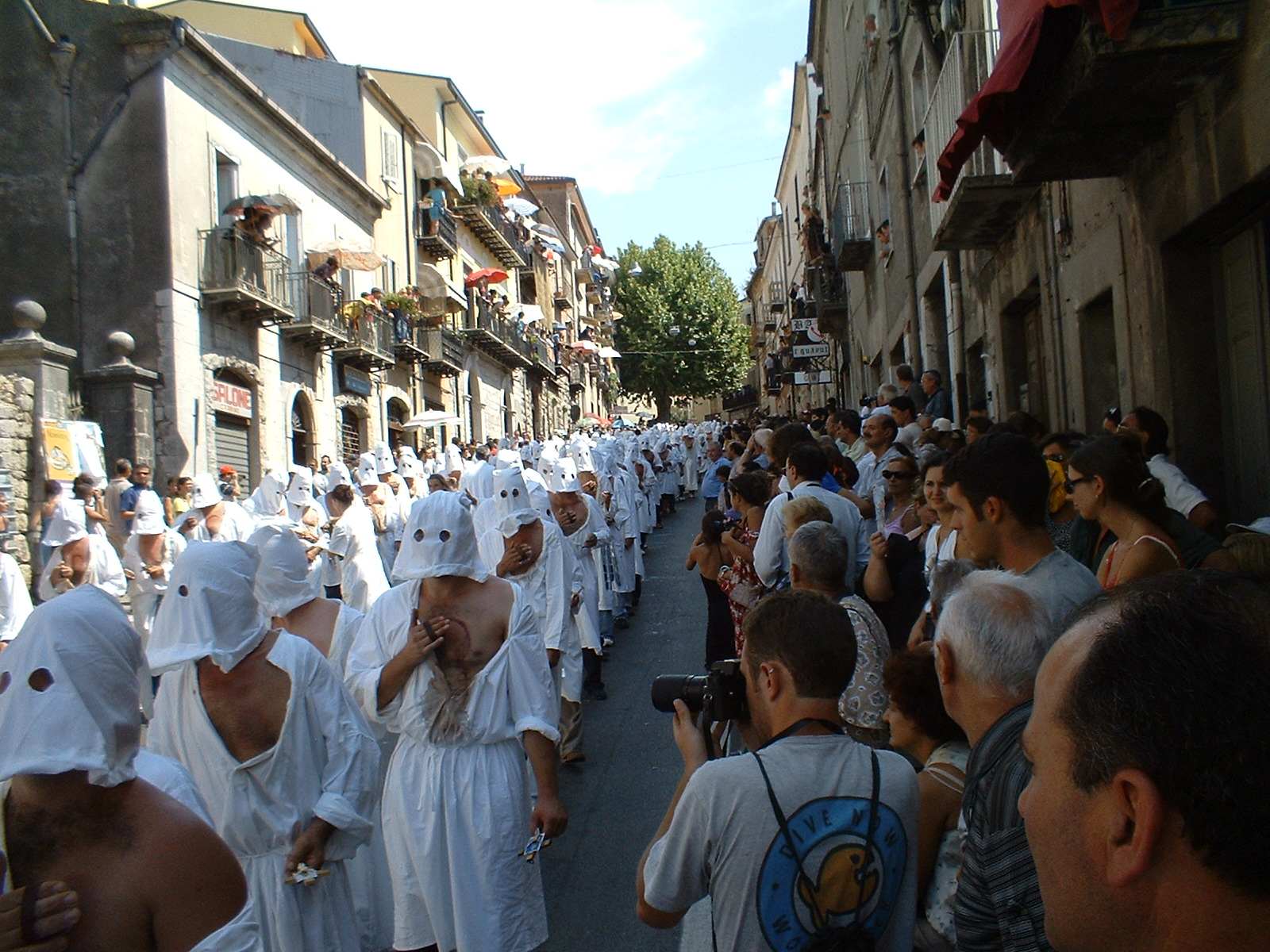
A Catholic Christian procession with battenti (beaters) mortifying the flesh with spugnas in the Italian city of Guardia Sanframondi

Some canonized Catholic saints and founders of Catholic religious organizations practiced mortification in order to imitate Christ. Another way of mortification that developed quickly in the early centuries was celibacy, which the Catholic tradition interprets as renouncing the joy of human marriage for a superior chastity and higher supernatural ends (cf. Works of Supererogation). for the sake of Christ.

==== Lutheranism ====
The Augsburg Confession of the Lutheran Church supports the practice of mortification of the flesh, stating:

For they [our teachers] have always taught concerning the cross that it behooves Christians to bear afflictions. This is the true, earnest, and unfeigned mortification, to wit, to be exercised with divers afflictions, and to be crucified with Christ. Moreover, they teach that every Christian ought to train and subdue himself with bodily restraints, or bodily exercises and labors that neither satiety nor slothfulness tempt him to sin, but not that we may merit grace or make satisfaction for sins by such exercises. And such external discipline ought to be urged at all times, not only on a few and set days. So Christ commands, Luke 21:34: Take heed lest your hearts be overcharged with surfeiting; also Matt. 17:21: This kind goeth not out but by prayer and fasting. Paul also says, 1 Cor. 9:27: I keep under my body and bring it into subjection. Here he clearly shows that he was keeping under his body, not to merit forgiveness of sins by that discipline, but to have his body in subjection and fitted for spiritual things, and for the discharge of duty according to his calling.

In the Lutheran tradition, mortification of the flesh is not done in order to earn merit, but instead to "keep the body in a condition such that it does not hinder one from doing what one has been commanded to do, according to one's calling (Latin: juxta vocationem suam)." In The Ninety-Five Theses, Martin Luther stated that "inner repentance is worthless unless it produces various outward mortification of the flesh." He practiced mortification of the flesh through fasting and self-flagellation, even sleeping in a stone cell without a blanket.

==== Methodism ====
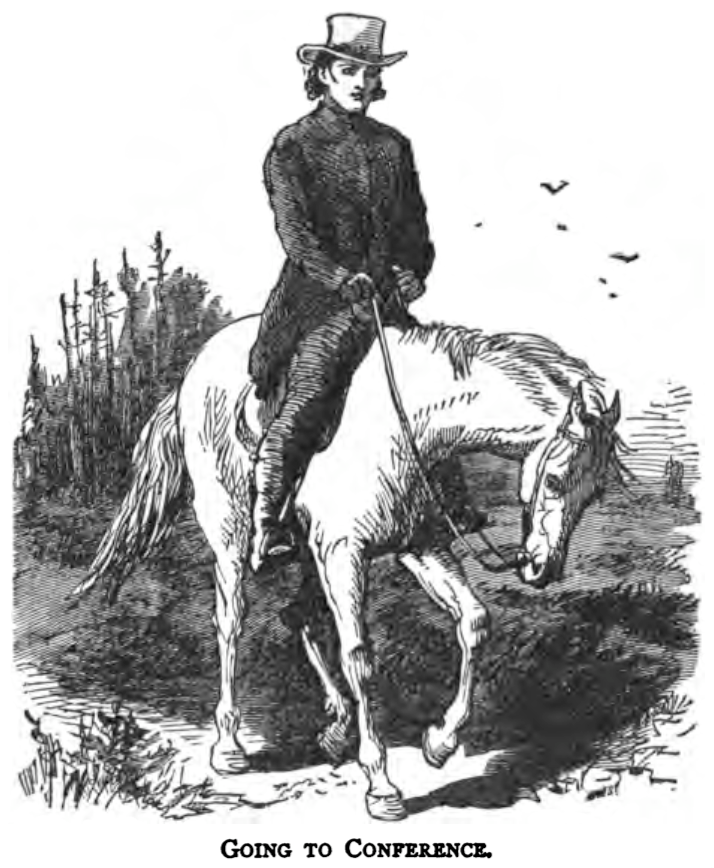
Illustration from The Circuit Rider: A Tale of the Heroic Age by Edward Eggleston depicting a Methodist circuit rider on horseback

Samuel Wesley Sr. examined the writings of Thomas à Kempis on the mortification of the flesh and concluded that "mortification is still an indispensable Christian duty." His son, John Wesley, the evangelical Christian progenitor of the Methodist Church continued "to hold à Kempis in high regard". As such, he likewise wrote that "efforts to manifest true faith would be 'quickened' by self mortification and entire obedience". Moreover, he "spoke approvingly of 'voluntary instances of mortification' in his journals".

Methodist circuit riders were known for practicing the spiritual discipline of mortifying the flesh as they "arose well before dawn for solitary prayer; they remained on their knees without food or drink or physical comforts sometimes for hours on end". John Cennick, the first Methodist itinerant preacher, prayed nine times a day, fasted and "fancying dry bread too great an indulgence for so great a sinner as himself, he began to feed on potatoes, acorns, crabs, and grass". The Methodist evangelist John Wesley Childs was known for "limiting what he would eat" and choosing "to walk beside his horse rather than to ride in order to demonstrate his willingness to suffer for his calling and to try[ing] to heighten his religious experience through subjecting himself to trials." The Wesleyan Methodist Magazine in 1813 published a statement written by Matthew Henry for Christian believers:

By using yourselves to consideration, you will come to be aware of the snares that your spiritual enemies lay for you, of the snake under the green grass, and will not be imposed upon so easily as many are by the wiles of Satan; and by habituating yourselves to self-denial and mortification of the flesh, and a holy contempt of this world, you will wrest the most dangerous weapons of the hand of the strong man armed, and will take from him that part of his armour most trusted, for it is by the world and the flesh that he mostly fights against us: nay, and this sober-mindedness will put you the whole armour of God, that you may be able to stand in the evil day; and so to resist the devil, that he may flee from you.

==== Western Orthodoxy ====
The Antiochian Western Rite Vicariate states that "mortification of the flesh, or the putting to death of the passions which hinder attainment of the kingdom of heaven, is practiced with three disciplines of self-denial". These spiritual disciplines include "unostentatious fasting or self-denial; increased prayer, by attending to worship and various devotions; and the sacrificial giving of alms (charitable donations)."

==== Other Christian viewpoints ====
It became "quite common" for members of the Oxford Movement within the Anglican Communion to practice self-flagellation using a discipline. Congregationalist writer and leader within the evangelical Christian movement, Sarah Osborn, practiced self-flagellation in order "to remind her of her continued sin, depravity, and vileness in the eyes of God". According to other evangelical Christian commentators, using Paul's writings and other passages from the New Testament to justify the practise of mortification of the flesh is a complete misinterpretation, arguing that Paul shows a very high view of Christ's redeeming work in the verses leading up to Colossians 1:24.

"He understands this redemptive work to be finished, completed, and perfected. Nothing remains to be done, and the suffering of Christ's followers does not put the finishing touches on the triumph of Calvary. Paul does not believe that suffering has any atoning benefit for himself or for others. It does, however, 'serve to increase Paul's living knowledge of Christ.'"

This suffering Paul refers to comes as one takes on the commission to share the gospel. Persecution and suffering such as that experienced by Christ will follow and Christians should see this suffering as a divine necessity. In chapter 9, "Paul compares the evangelistic lifestyle of believers to athletes who sacrifice normal pursuits for the sake of strict training and a competitive edge". In the Corinth church there were grey areas of lifestyle and behaviors not specifically covered by the Mosaic law, and Paul was encouraging them to discipline themselves to abstain from those behaviors and practices for the sake of winning others to Christ.

== Analogous non-Christian concepts ==
=== Indigenous practices and shamanism ===
Some indigenous cultures' shamans believe that endurance of pain or denial of appetites serves to increase spiritual power. In many indigenous cultures, painful rites are used to mark sexual maturity, marriage, procreation, or other major life stages. In Africa and Australia, indigenous people sometimes use genital mutilation on boys and girls that is intentionally painful, including circumcision, subincision, clitoridectomy, piercing, or infibulation. In some Native American tribes enduring scarification or the bites of ants are common rituals to mark a boy's transition to adulthood. Human rights organizations in several areas of the world have protested some of these methods, which can be forced upon the participants, although some are voluntary and are a source of pride and status.

Shamans often use painful rites and self-denial such as fasting or celibacy to attain transformation, or to commune with spirits.

=== Secular practices ===
It has been speculated that extreme practices of mortification of the flesh may be used to obtain an altered state of consciousness to achieve spiritual experiences or visions. In modern times, members of the Church of Body Modification believe that by manipulating and modifying their bodies (by painful processes) they can strengthen the bond between their bodies and spirits, and become more spiritually aware. This group uses rites of passage from many traditions including Hinduism, Buddhism, and shamanism, to seek their aims.

In some contexts, modern practices of body modification and plastic surgery overlap with mortification. Often, secular people will undergo painful experiences in order to become more self-aware, to take control of their bodies or "own" them more fully, to bond with a group that is spiritual in its aims, or to overcome the body's limitations in ways that do not refer to any higher power. Many times these rites are intended to empower the participant, rather than humble them. This represents a very different aim than many traditional mortifications.

Roland Loomis re-created Sun Dance ceremonies and suspensions, believing that these painful procedures expand their consciousness. Fakir Musafar explained his use of these rites as a way to awaken the spirit to the body's limits, and put it in control of them. Others who have used these experiences to transcend physical limitations report a feeling of mastery over their physical circumstance, along with a widened perspective.

== See also ==
- Confraternities of the Cord – Christian pious associations whose members wear a cord, girdle, or cincture
- Flagellant – Practitioner of a form of mortification of the flesh
- Self-flagellation – Whipping oneself as part of a religious ritual
- Guardia Sanframondi
- Penance – Repentance of sins
- Self harm – Intentional injury to one's body
