= Capirote =

Christian pointed hat of conical form

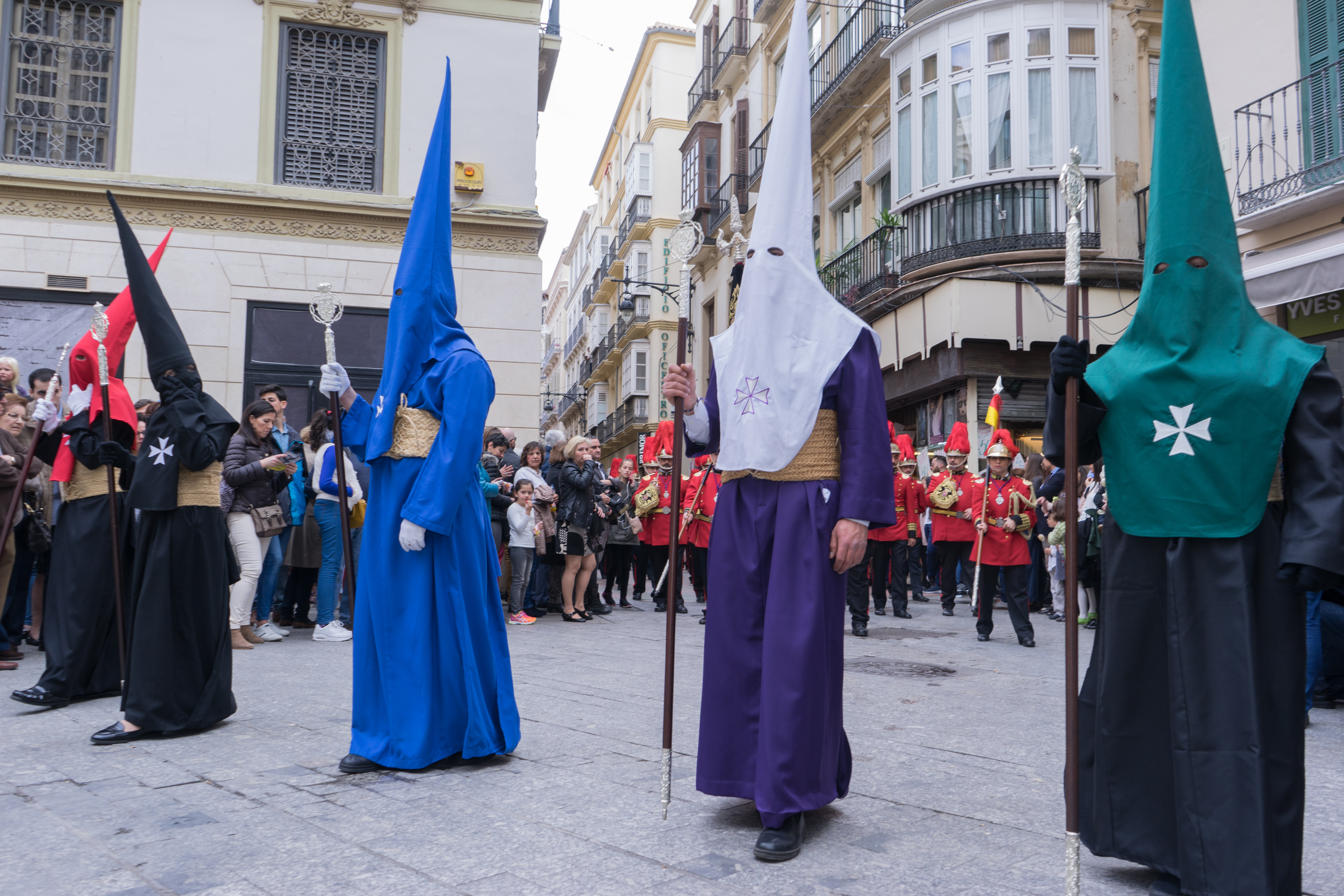
Procession of the Reales Cofradías Fusionadas in Malaga

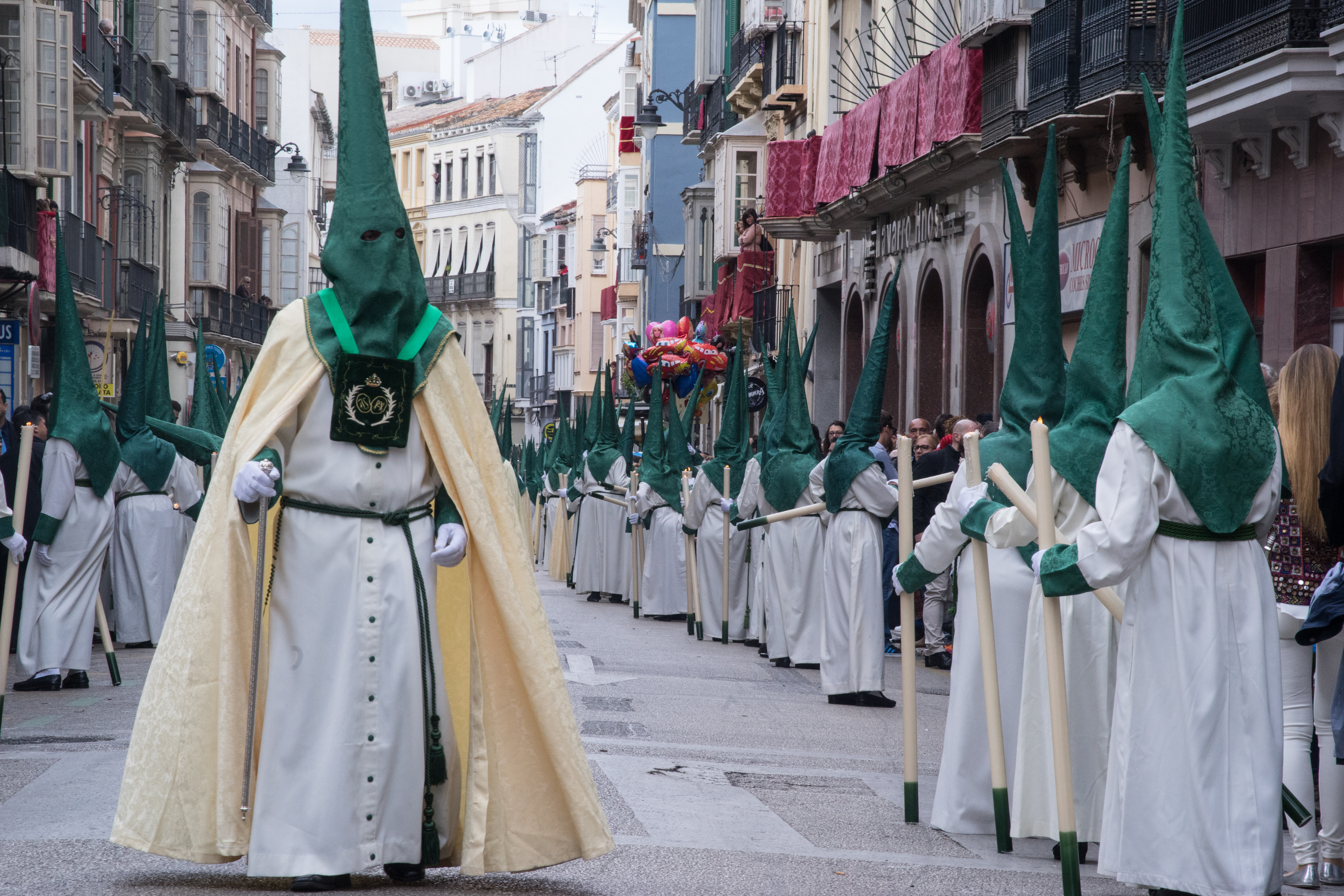
Brotherhood with green capirotes in Malaga

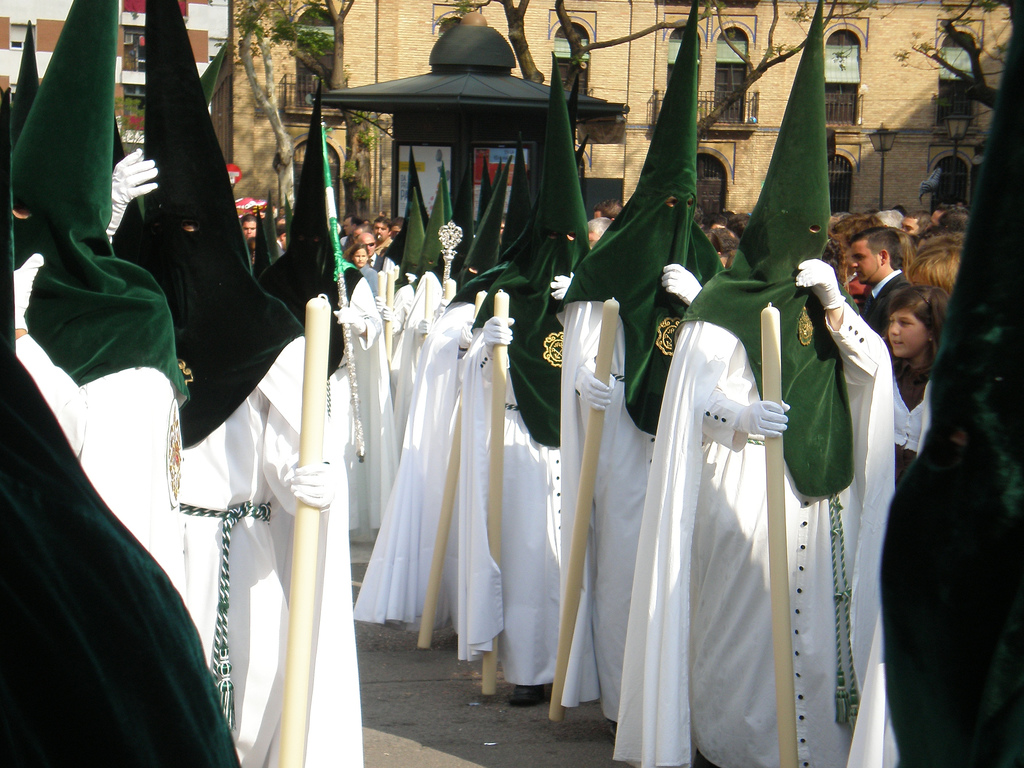
Brotherhood of Saint Rochus with velvet capirotes

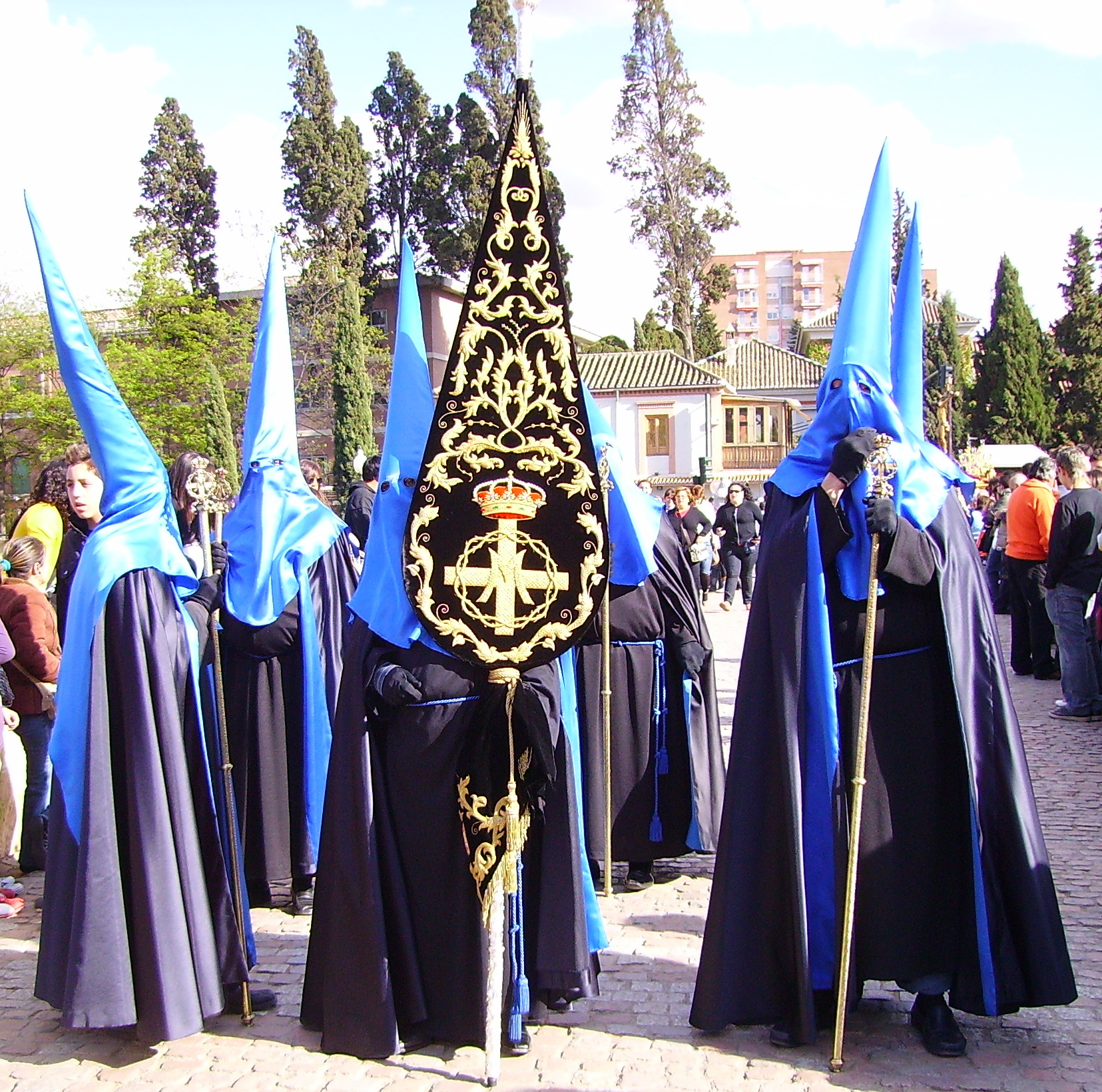
Brotherhood with silk capirotes

A capirote is a Christian pointed hat of conical form that is used in Italy, Spain and Hispanic countries by members of a confraternity of penitents, particularly those of the Catholic Church. It is part of the uniform of such brotherhoods including the Nazarenos and Fariseos during Lenten observances and reenactments during Holy Week in Spain and its former colonies, though similar hoods are common in other Christian countries such as Italy. Capirote are worn by penitents so that attention is not drawn towards themselves as they repent, but instead to God. It was later appropriated by white supremacist, anti-Catholic groups like the Ku Klux Klan.

== History ==
Historically, the flagellants are the origin of the current traditions, as they flogged themselves with a discipline to do penance. Pope Clement VI ordered that flagellants could perform penance only under control of the Church; he decreed Inter sollicitudines ("inner concerns" for suppression). This is considered one of the reasons why flagellants often hid their faces.

The use of the capirote or coroza was prescribed in Spain by the Holy Office, otherwise known as the Inquisition. Men and women who were arrested had to wear a paper capirote in public as sign of public humiliation. The capirote was worn during the session of an Auto-da-fé. The colour was different, conforming to the judgement of the office. People who were condemned to be executed wore a red coroza. Other punishments used different colours.

When the Inquisition was abolished, the symbol of punishment and penitence was kept in the Catholic brotherhood, however, the capirotes used today are different; they are covered in fine fabric, as prescribed by the brotherhood. To this day, they are still worn during the celebration of the Holy Week and Easter most notably in Andalusia, by penitentes (those who perform public penance for their sins) who walk through streets with the capirote.

The usage of the capirote during the Holy Week was once common throughout the Spanish colonial empire, but this custom has since died out in most of them by the late 19th century. Notable exceptions to this are some parts of Mexico, Guatemala, and the Philippines.

In the Philippines, a former Spanish colony, male Catholic penitents of the Tais-Dupol Confraternity wear capirotes and walk barefoot during Holy Week in Palo, Leyte. The group's name comes from Waray tais, meaning "pointed", and dupol, meaning "blunt", referring to the shape of the hood. The tradition has been followed since the late 1800s when the group was organized by the Franciscan friar Pantaleón de la Fuente. The wearing of the hood is linked to Christ’s admonition in Matthew 6:16-18 that humble anonymity be preserved during penance and fasting.

The capirote is today the symbol of the Catholic penitent: only members of a confraternity of penance are allowed to wear these during solemn processions. Children can receive the capirote after their First Holy Communion, when they enter the brotherhood.

== Design ==
Historically the design is called the capirote, but the brotherhoods cover it with fabric together with their face, and the medal of the brotherhood that is worn underneath. The cloth has two holes for the penitent to see through. The insignia or crest of the brotherhood is usually embroidered on the capirote in fine gold.

The capirote is worn during the whole penance.

== Use by the Ku Klux Klan ==
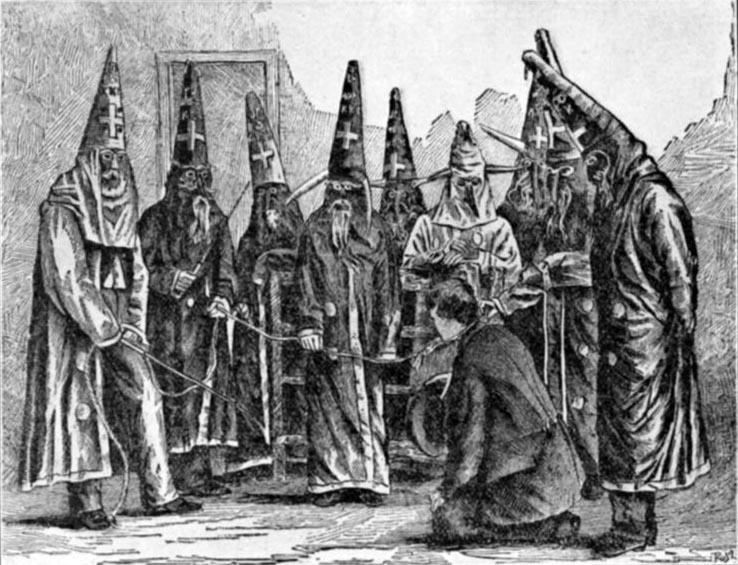
Early Klan members in capirote-like uniforms

The capirote was appropriated by the early 20th-century American Ku Klux Klan, a white supremacist and anti-Catholic group. Alison Kinney of New Republic traces the modern uniform to the popularity of the film The Birth of a Nation, whose costume inspiration was not credited.

Due to the capirote being appropriated by the KKK in American history, the capirote in Europe has often been a source of confusion and misunderstanding by Americans who incorrectly believe it to be the Klan.

== In popular culture ==
- The Penitent One, the protagonist of the video games Blasphemous and Blasphemous 2, wears a metal helmet that combines a capirote with a face mask, wrapped in thorns.
- In the 1979 Lupin III film The Castle of Cagliostro, during the wedding of the Count and Clarisse, as they approach the altar, they are accompanied by a procession of his armored assassins, all wearing black capirotes and robes over their usual armor.
- In the tabletop skirmish game Trench Crusade, many of the Trench Pilgrims wear an iron capirote as military equipment, said to render them utterly fearless.
- The Neo Atlantean soldiers from the 1990s anime Nadia: The Secret of Blue Water wear capirote like hoods with a face mask, the color and design of the face masks differ to signify different ranks and professions within the organization.

== Gallery ==
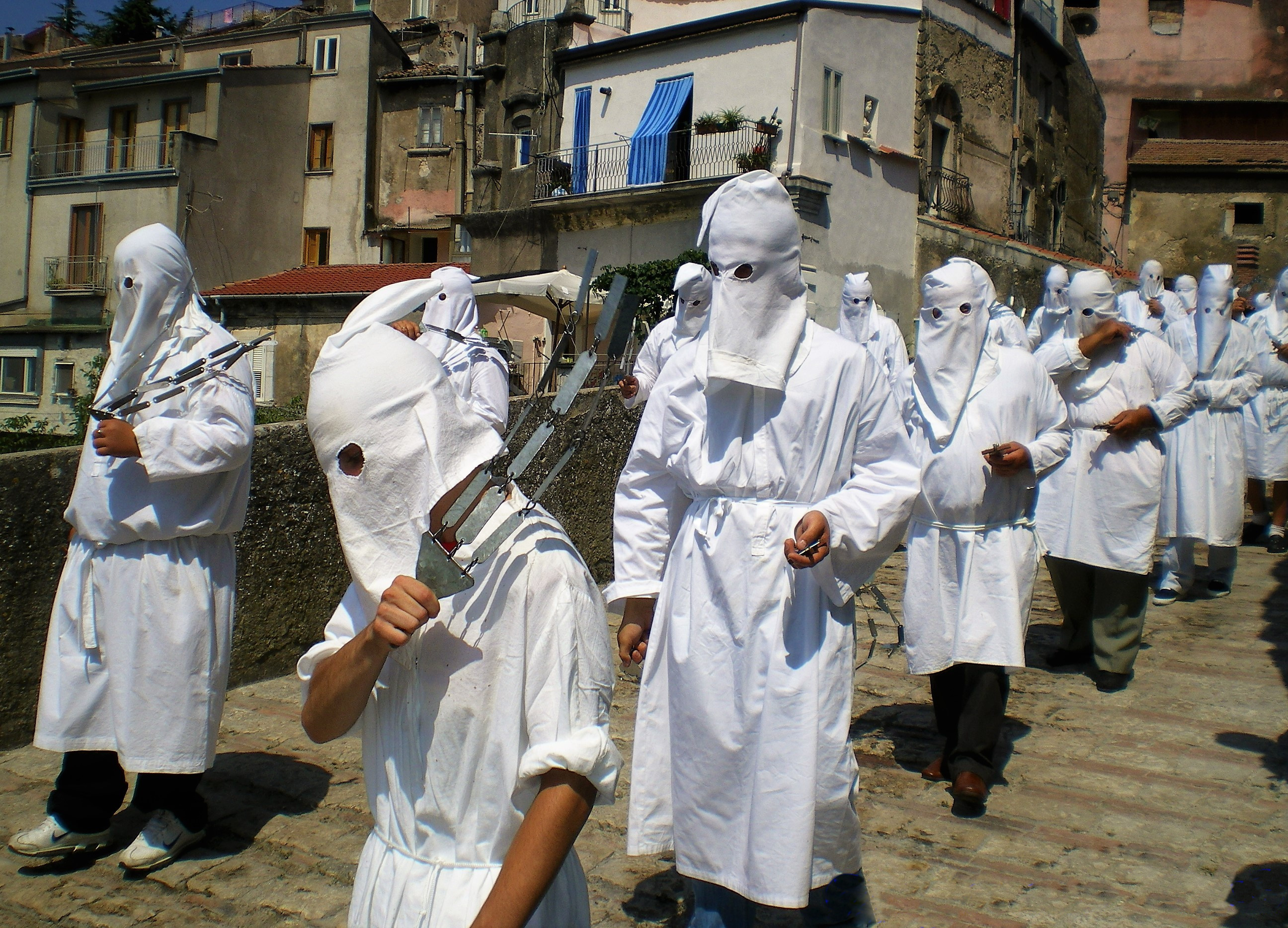
A confraternity of penitents in Italy mortifying the flesh with disciplines in a seven-hour procession; hoods similar to the capirote are worn by penitents in order to not draw attention to themselves, but to God (2010)

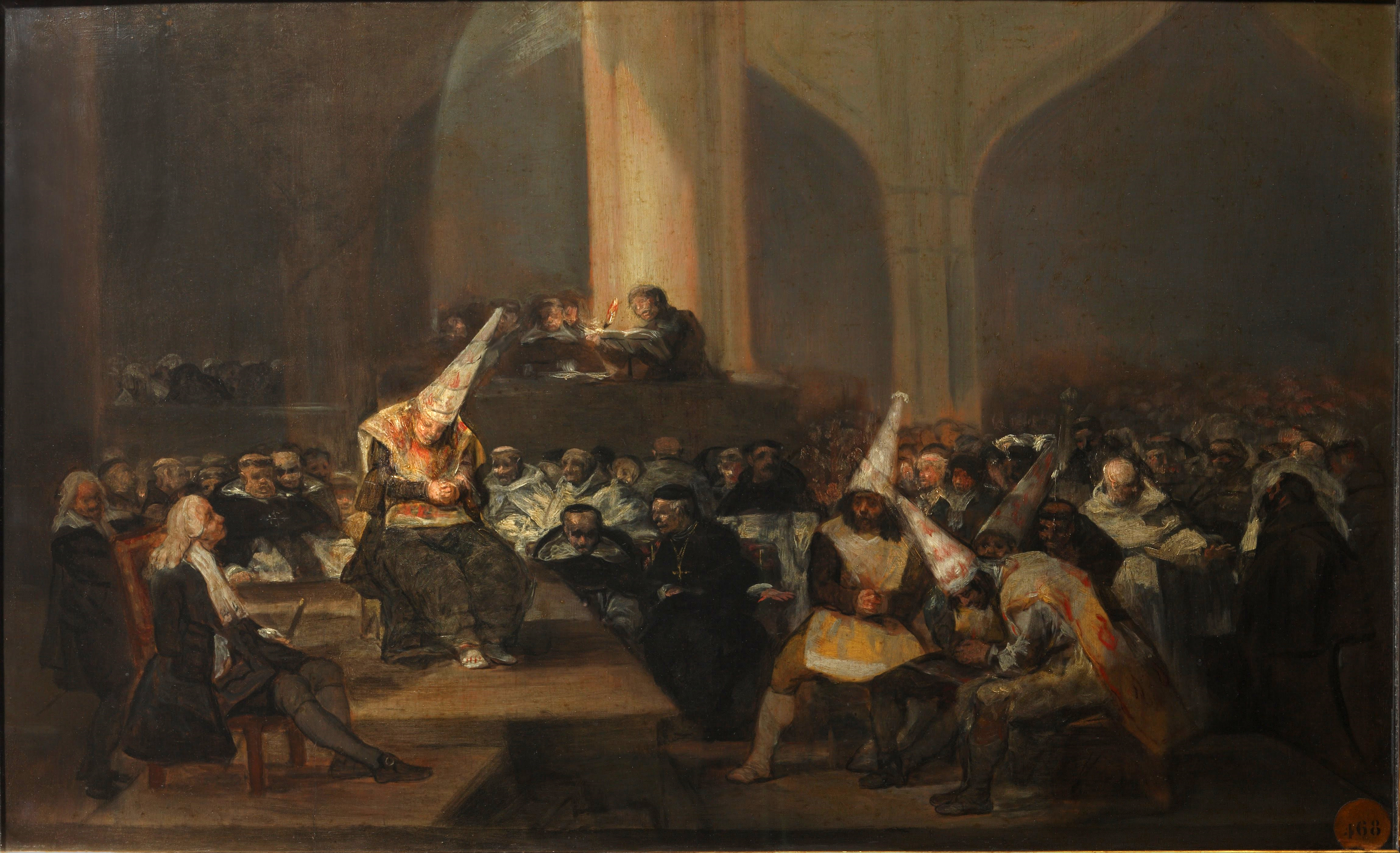
The Inquisition Tribunal

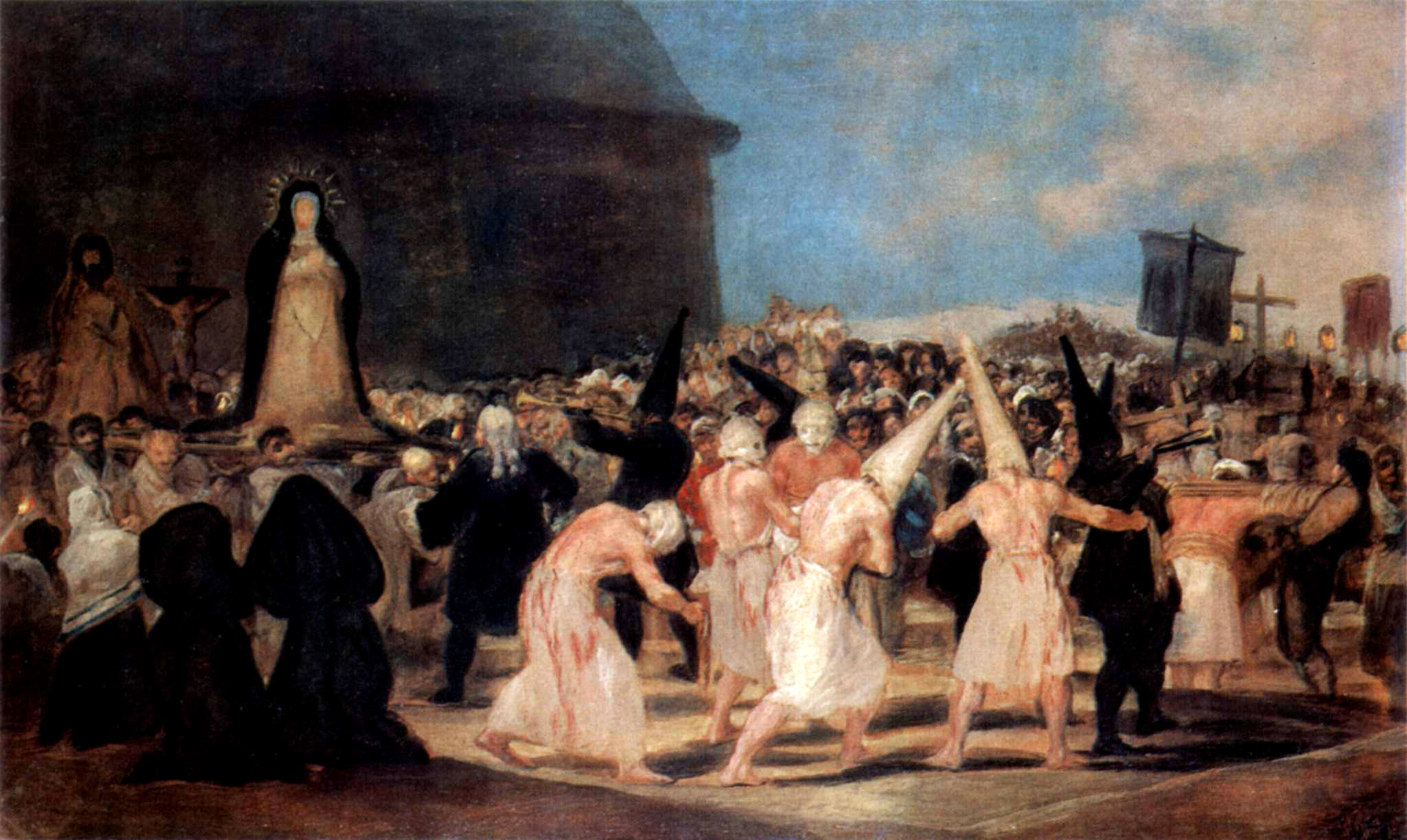
A Procession of Flagellants, Goya, 1812–1819

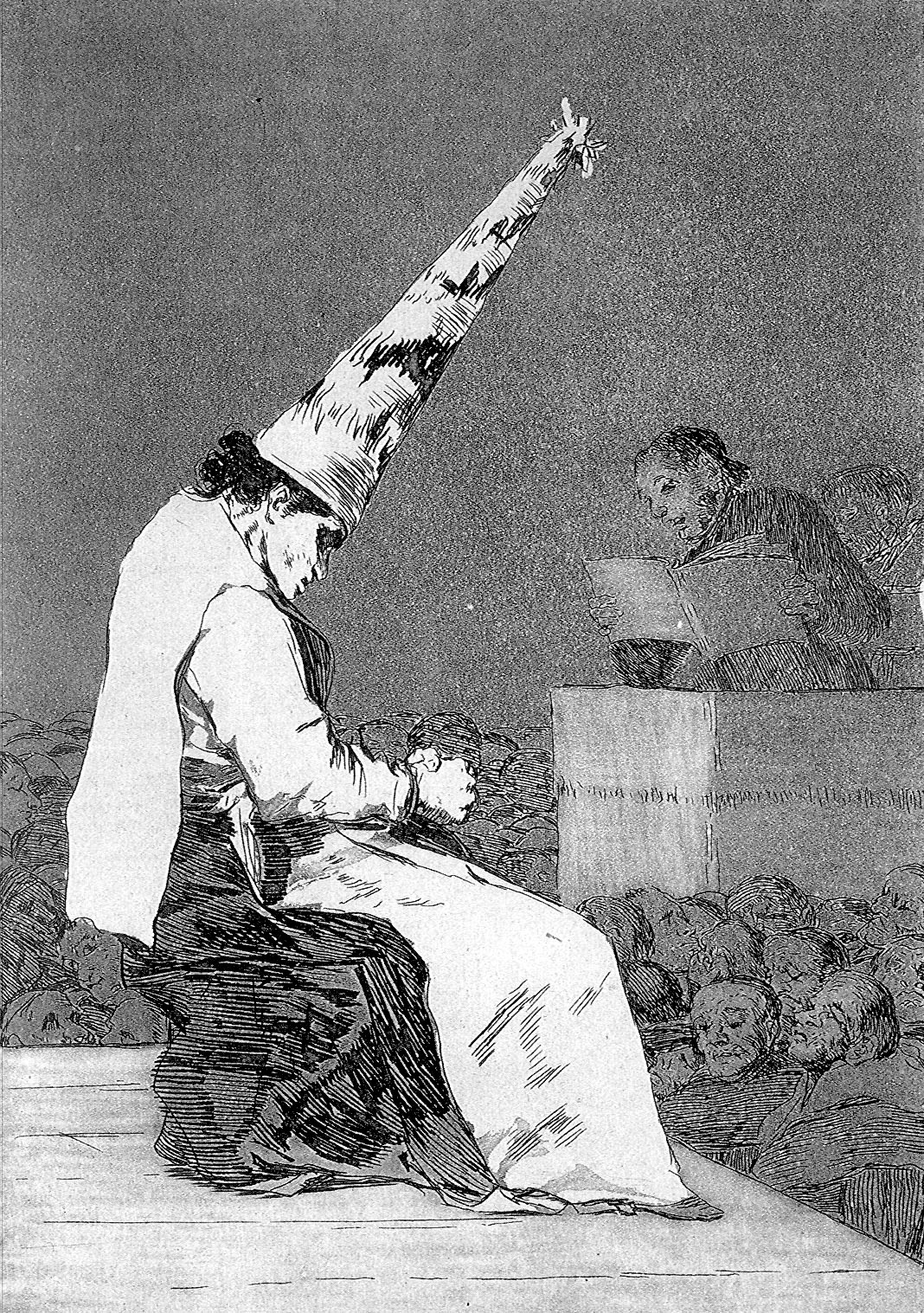
Prisoner wearing capirote and Sanbenito, Goya

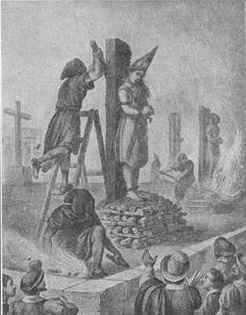
Execution of Francisca Nuñez de Carabajal, Mexico City, 1601

== See also ==
- Dunce § Dunce cap
- List of hat styles
- List of headgear
- Sanbenito
