= Cilice =

Coarse garment important to Christianity

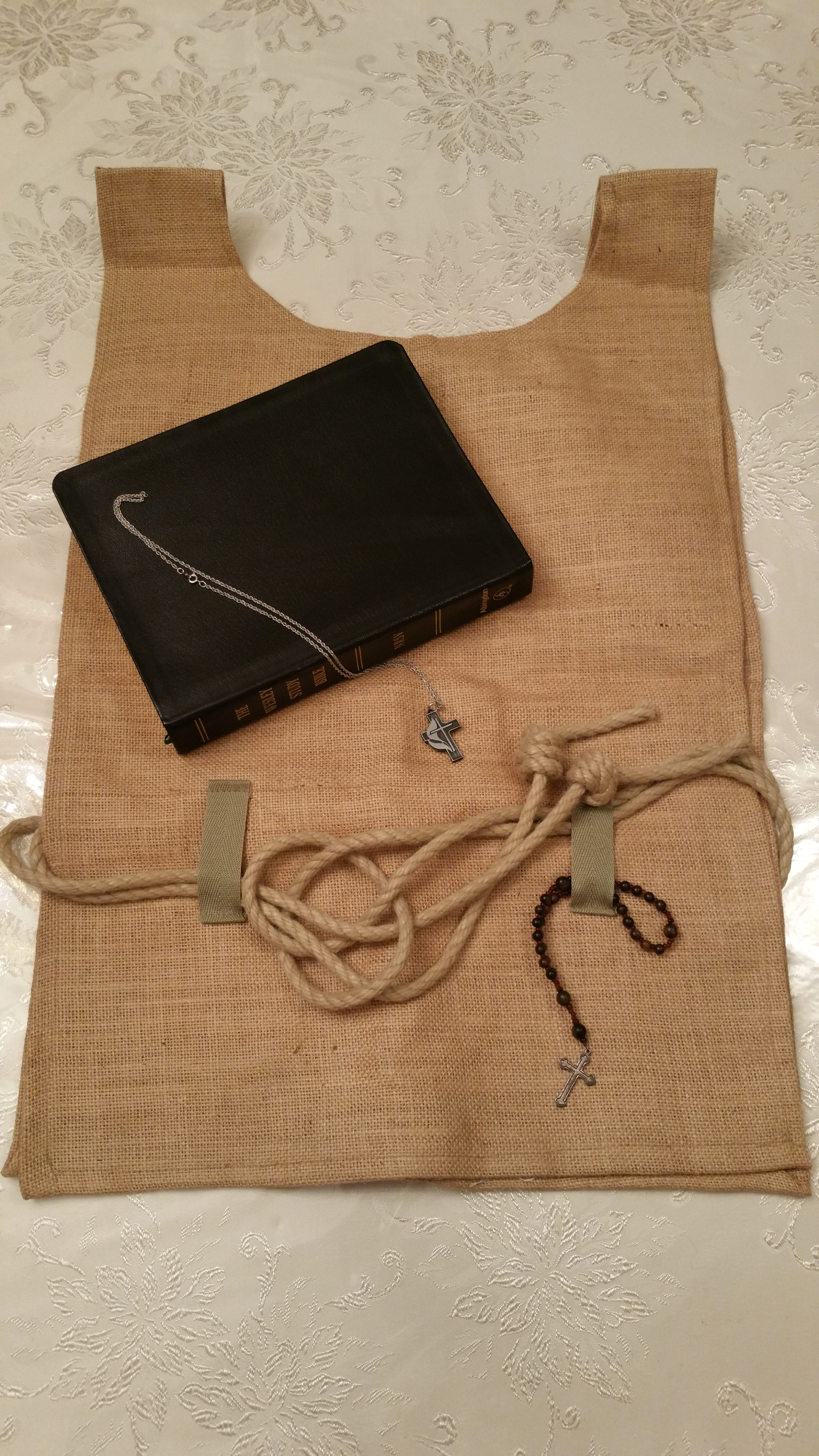
- A hairshirt belonging to a Christian, with rosary hanging off a belt loop used to hold the girdle that tightens the garment around the waist
- Type: Undergarment
- Material: Coarse cloth or animal hair
- Place of origin: Cilicia
- Introduced: Post-Exilic period

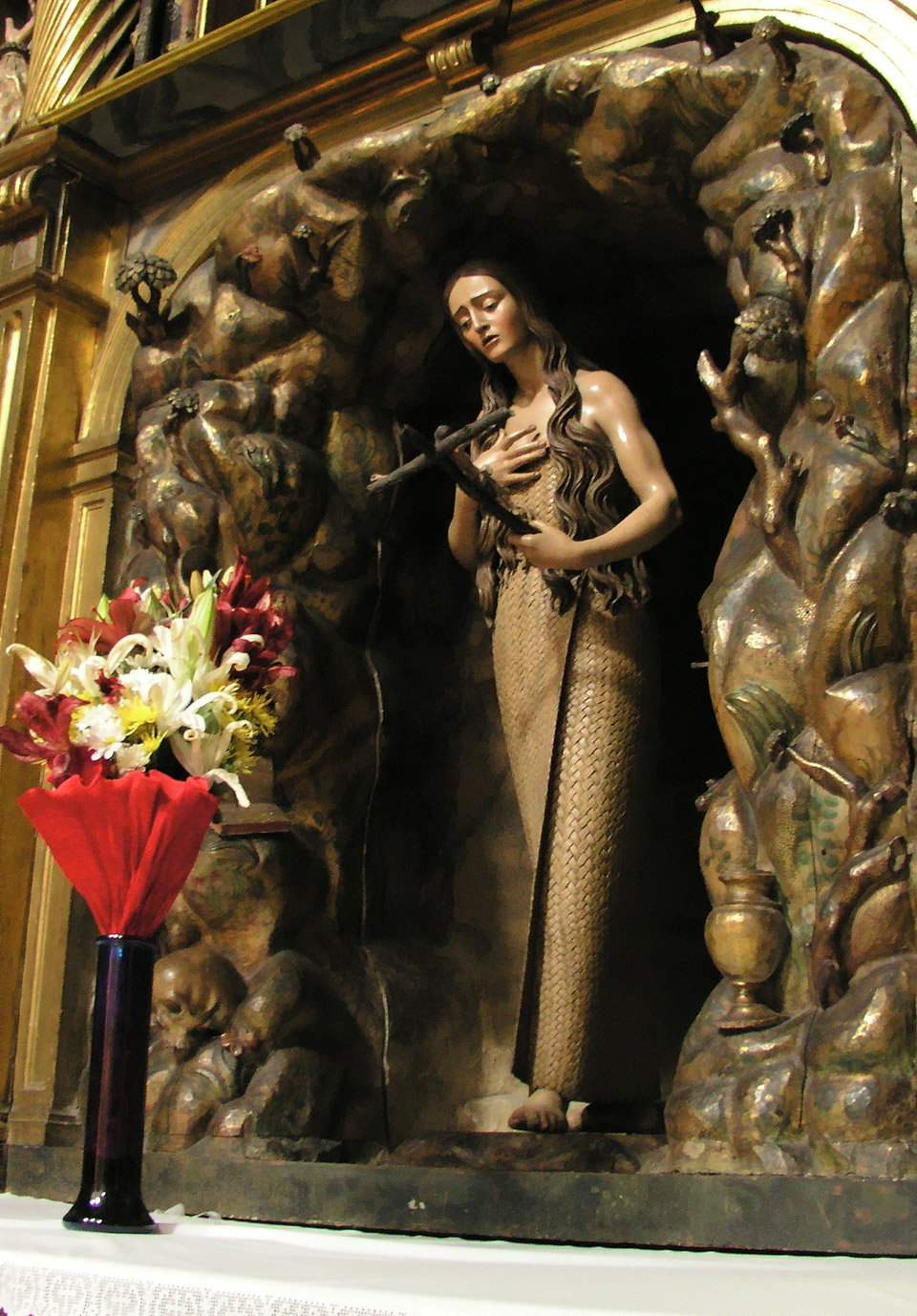
Mary Magdalene in cilice. Polychrome wood carving by Pedro de Mena, Church of San Miguel and San Julian, Valladolid

A cilice /ˈsɪlɪs/, also known as a sackcloth, was originally a garment or undergarment made of coarse cloth or animal hair (a hairshirt) worn close to the skin. It is used by members of various Christian traditions (including the Catholic, Lutheran, Anglican, Methodist, and Scottish Presbyterian churches) as a self-imposed means of repentance and mortification of the flesh; as an instrument of penance, it is often worn during the Christian penitential season of Lent, especially on Ash Wednesday, Good Friday, and other Fridays of the Lenten season.

Hairshirt cilices were originally made from coarse animal hair, as an imitation of the garment worn by John the Baptist that was made of camel hair, or sackcloth which, throughout the Bible, was worn by people repenting. Cilices were designed to irritate the skin; other features were added to make cilices more uncomfortable, such as thin wires or twigs. In modern Christian religious circles, cilices are simply any device worn for the same purposes, often taking the form of a hairshirt cilice as well as a (spiked metal) chain cilice.

== Etymology ==
The word cilice derives from the Latin cilicium, a covering made of goat's hair from Cilicia, a Roman province in south-east Asia Minor. The reputed first Scriptural use of this exact term is in the Vulgate (Latin) translation of Psalm 35:13, "Ego autem, cum mihi molesti essent, induebar cilicio." ("But as for me, when they were sick, my clothing was sackcloth" in the King James Bible). The term is translated as hair-cloth in the Douay–Rheims Bible, and as sackcloth in the King James Bible and Book of Common Prayer. Sackcloth can also mean burlap, or is associated as a symbol of mourning, a form of hairshirt.

== Use ==
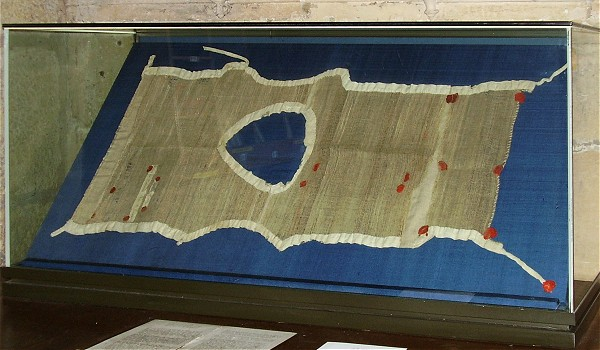
Hairshirt cilice of St. Louis at St. Aspais Church, Melun, France

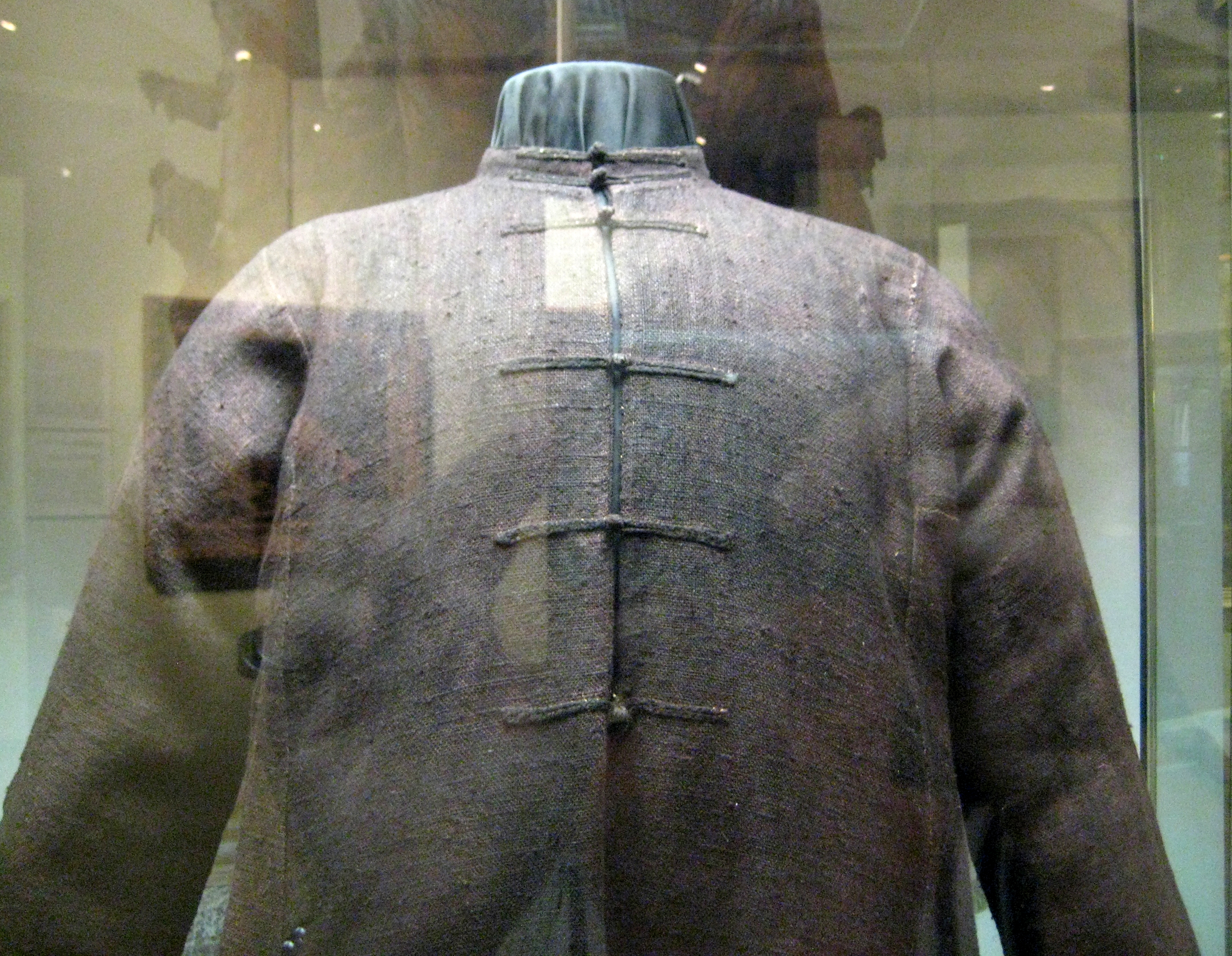
Ivan the Terrible's hairshirt cilice (16th century). The tsar wanted to die like a monk.

In Biblical times, it was the Jewish custom to wear a hairshirt (sackcloth) when "mourning or in a public show of repentance for sin" (Genesis 37:34, 2 Samuel 3:31, Esther 4:1). In the New Testament, John the Baptist wore "a garment of camel's hair" as a means of repentance (Matthew 3:4). As such, adherents of many Christian denominations have worn sackcloth to repent, mortify the flesh or as a penance, especially for sins relating to lavishly adorning oneself (cf. 1 Peter 3:3, 1 Timothy 2:9).

Cilices have been used for centuries in the Catholic Church as a mild form of bodily penance akin to fasting. Thomas Becket was wearing a hairshirt when he was martyred, St. Patrick reputedly wore a cilice, Charlemagne was buried in a hairshirt, and Henry IV, Holy Roman Emperor and King of Germany, famously wore one in the Walk to Canossa during the Investiture Controversy. Prince Henry the Navigator was found to be wearing a hairshirt at the time of his death in 1460. St. Francis of Assisi, St. Ignatius of Loyola, St. Thomas More and St. Therese of Lisieux are known to have used them. Scottish king James IV wore a cilice during Lent to repent of the indirect role he played in his father's death. In modern times they have been used by Mother Teresa, St. Padre Pio, and Pope Paul VI. In the Discalced Carmelite convent of St. Teresa in Livorno, Italy, members of Opus Dei who are celibate (about 30% of the membership), and the Franciscan Brothers and Sisters of the Immaculate Conception continue an ascetic use of the cilice. According to John Allen, an American Catholic writer, its practice in the Catholic Church is "more widespread than many observers imagine".

Some high church Anglicans, including Edward Bouverie Pusey, wore hairshirts as a part of their spirituality.

In the Presbyterian Church of Scotland, influenced by the evangelical revival, penitents were dressed in sackcloth and called in front of the chancel, where they were ordered to admit their sins.

In some Methodist churches in the United States, on Ash Wednesday, communicants, along with receiving ashes, also receive a piece of sackcloth "as a reminder of our own sinful ways and need for repentance".

== In popular culture ==
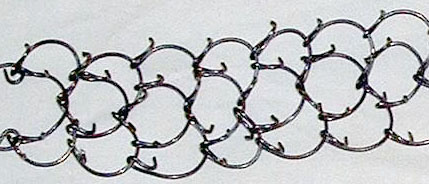
Closeup of a metal chain cilice with inwardly-pointing tines

In Thomas Pynchon's 1997 postmodern historical novel Mason & Dixon, upon arriving at a Jesuit college in Quebec the character Eliza Fields is dressed in a cilice by nuns as a sadomasochistic punishment after having admitted to feelings of sexual arousal during her prior capture by a group of Native Americans. The spiked form of cilice, fashioned from a rose plant, that Pynchon's character experiences appears to be based on those used by the 20th century Opus Dei. The cilice has been interpreted as a deliberate narrative device to muddy the historical accuracy of the novel and point to the relevance of historical slavery in the contemporary United States.^{α}

In Dan Brown's novel The Da Vinci Code, one of the antagonists, an albino numerary named Silas associated with the religious organization Opus Dei, wears a cilice in the form of a spiked belt around his thigh. The sensationalized depiction in the novel has been criticized for its inaccuracy in subsequent books and by Opus Dei itself, which issued a press release responding to the movie's depiction of the practice, claiming "In reality, they cause a fairly low level of discomfort comparable to fasting. There is no blood, no injury, nothing to harm a person's health, nothing traumatic. If it caused any harm, the Church would not allow it."

In George RR Martin's novel, Fire and Blood, King Aegon Targaryen III, upon ascending the Iron Throne following the death of his half brothers and parents, was known to have worn a hair shirt under his velvets and satin clothing. The character is depicted as prone to isolation and joylessness, with little interest in entertainment, food, or sex.

The goat hair shirt of Thomas More, presented for safe keeping by Margaret Clement, was long in the custody of the community of Augustinian canonesses who until 1983 lived at the convent at Abbotskerswell Priory, Devon. Some sources, including one from 2004, claimed that the shirt was then at the Martyr's church on the Weld family's estate in Chideock, Dorset. In 2011 the shirt was put on public display at Buckfast Abbey, near Buckfastleigh in Devon.

== See also ==
- Fasting
- Hessian fabric

== Notes ==
^α For relevant passage see Pynchon, Thomas (1998). "53". Mason & Dixon. Reading: Vintage. p. 520. ISBN 9780099771913.
