= Gate of Doña Urraca =

- Puerta de Doña Urraca (Spanish)
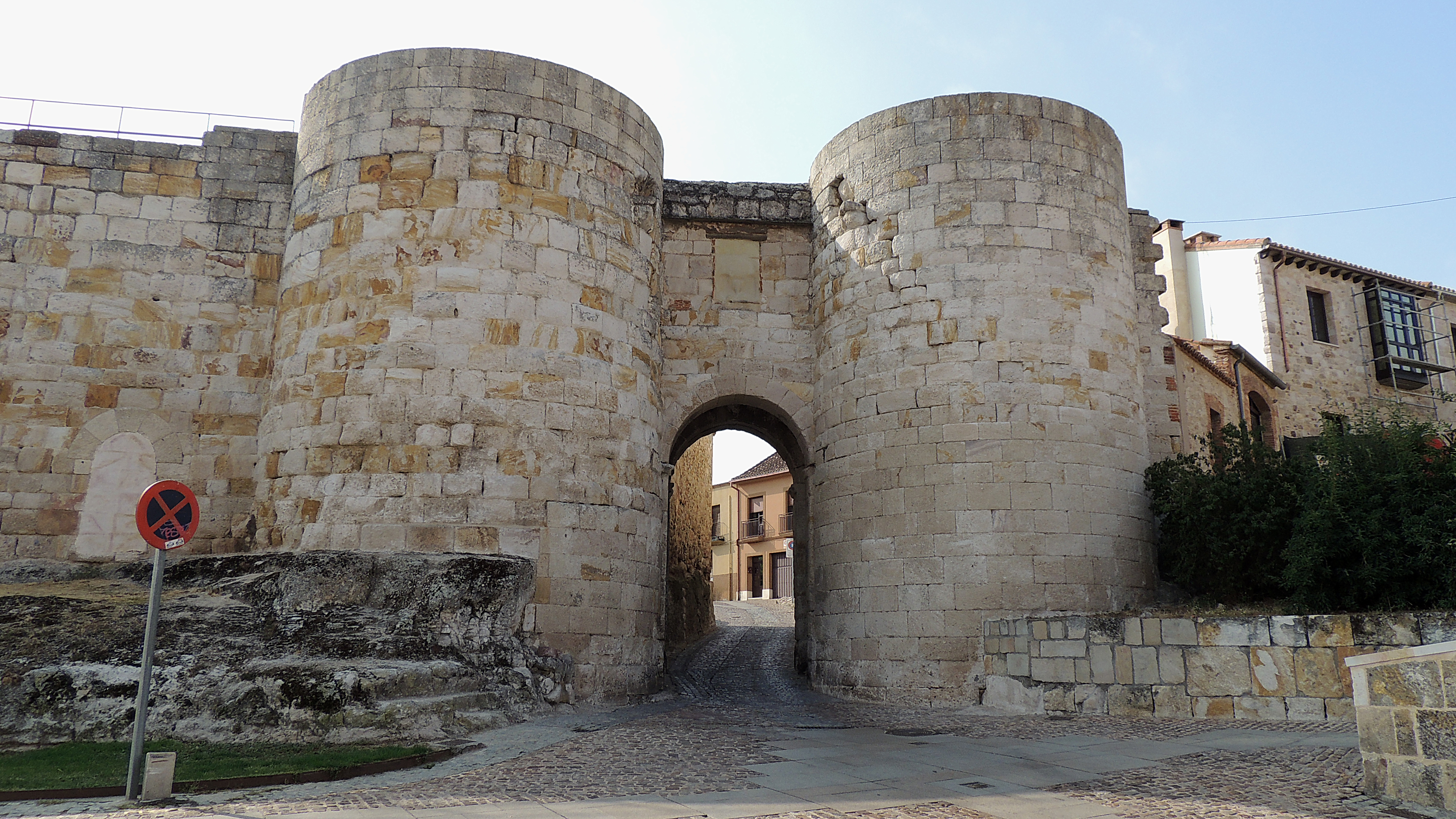

- Location within Spain
- 41.504468°N 5.74872°W
- Location: Zamora, Spain

Spanish Cultural Heritage
- Official name: Puerta de Doña Urraca
- Type: Non-movable
- Criteria: Monument
- Designated: 1874
- Reference no.: RI-51-0000011

The Gate of Doña Urraca (Spanish: Puerta de Doña Urraca) is a gate which gives access to the walled city of Zamora, Spain. It is named after the historical figure Urraca of Zamora.

The medieval structure has been given the heritage listing Bien de Interés Cultural, and has been protected since 1874.

== See also ==
- List of Bien de Interés Cultural in the Province of Zamora
