= Holy Week in Zamora =

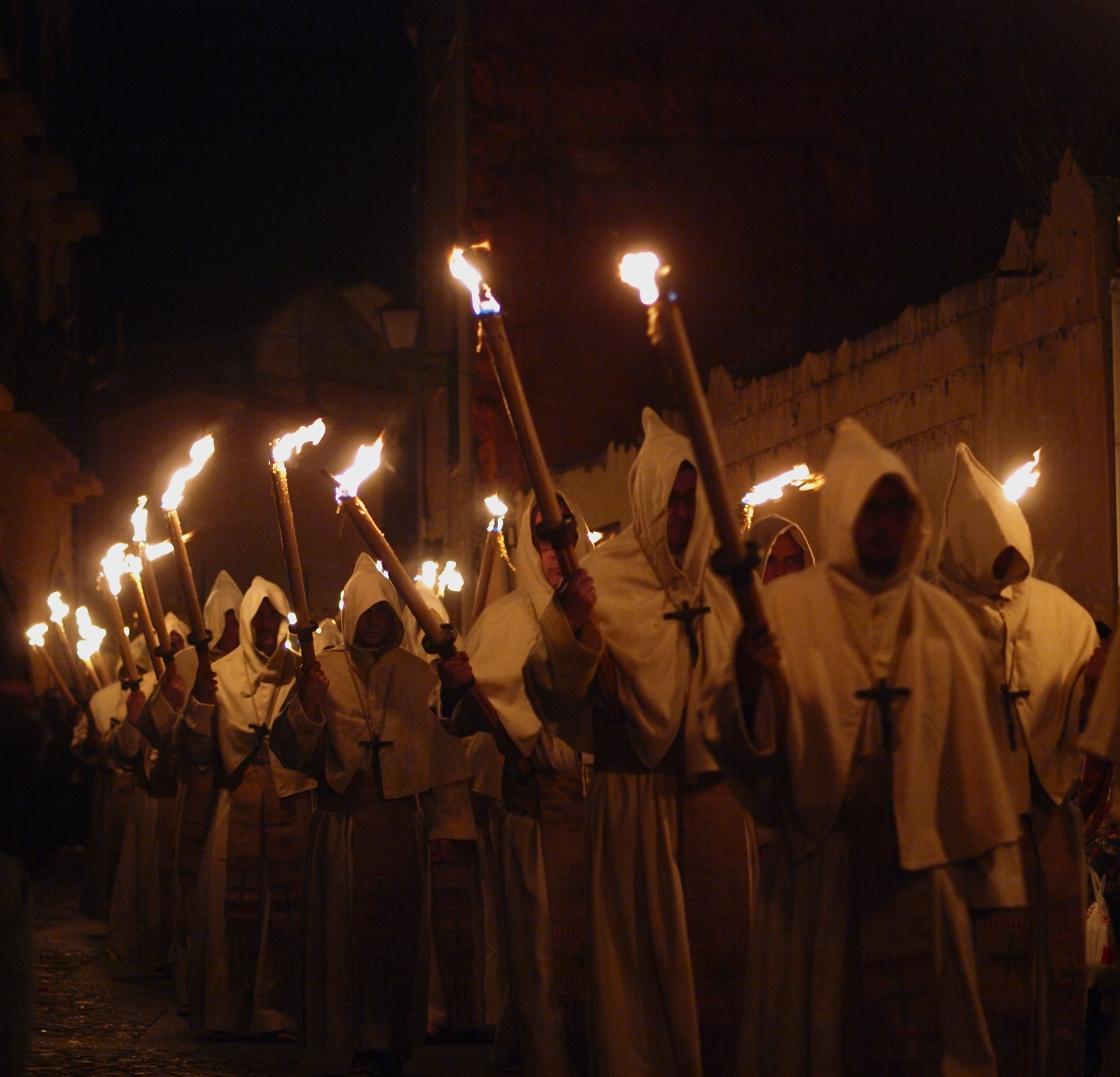
- Holy Week procession in Zamora
- Official name: Semana Santa de Zamora
- Observed by: Zamora, Spain
- Type: Religious, Historical, Cultural
- Significance: Commemoration of the passion, death and resurrection of Jesus
- Celebrations: Processions
- Begins: Palm Sunday
- Ends: Easter Sunday
- 2025 date: April 13 - April 20
- 2026 date: March 29 - April 5
- 2027 date: March 21 - March 28
- 2028 date: April 9 - April 16
- Frequency: Annual

Holy Week in Zamora, Spain, is the annual commemoration of the Passion of Jesus Christ that takes place during the last week of Lent, the week immediately before Easter. Holy Week is the Christian week from Palm Sunday (also called Passion Sunday) through Easter Sunday. It can take place in March or April. In Zamora, Holy Week is celebrated by 16 Catholic religious brotherhoods and fraternities that perform penance processions on the streets of the city.

Holy Week in Zamora was declared in 1986 Fiesta of International Tourist Interest of Spain. This festival is what Zamora is best known for.

== Characteristics ==
Holy Week in Zamora is well known for its soberness, remarkable different from other celebrations, and for being attended for thousands of people, locals and visitors.

The contrast between the daytime and nocturnal processions is marked: silence and meditation are characteristic of those that parade by night and in the early hours, while music and light define the daytime processions.

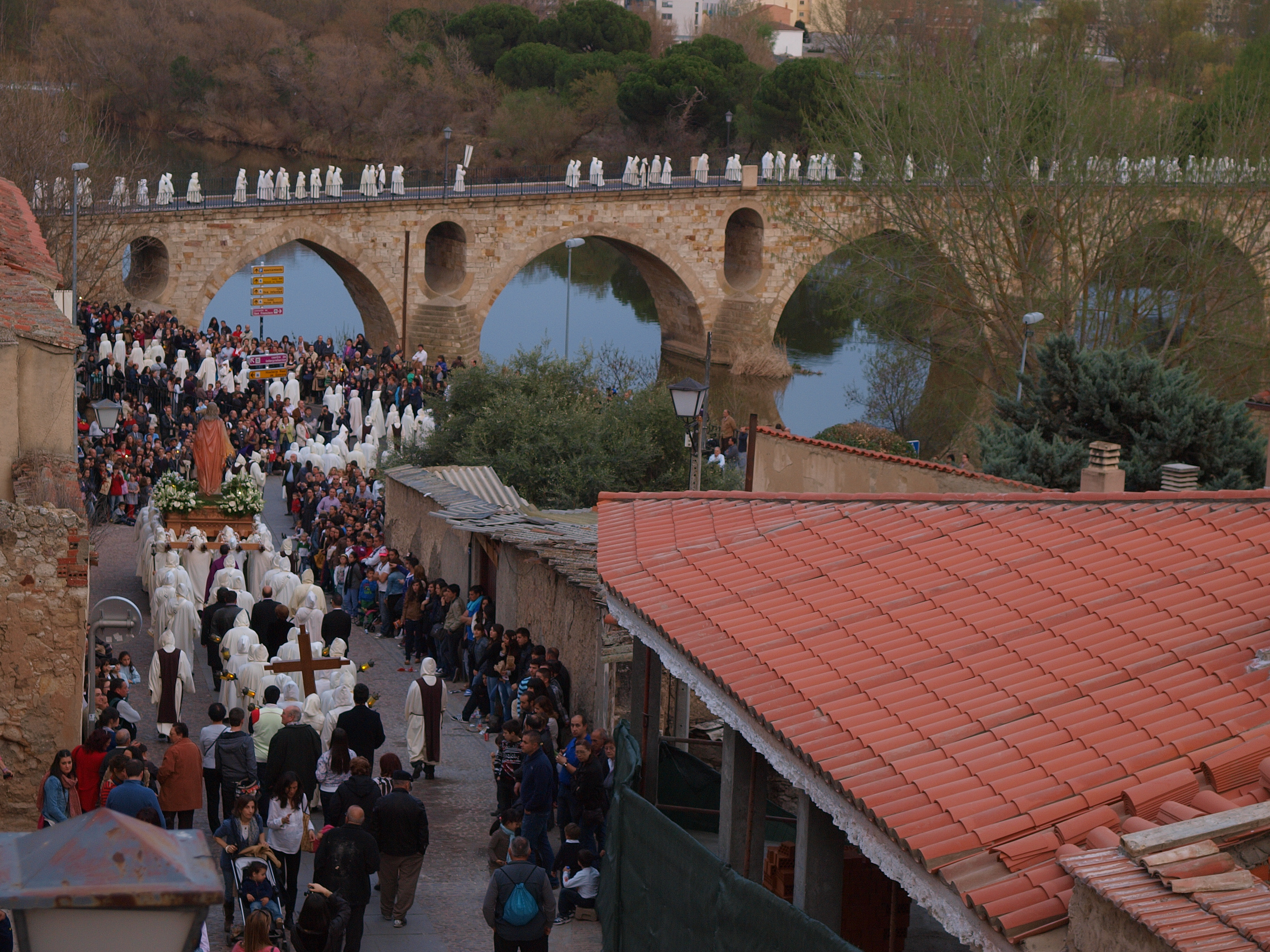
The parade of Jesus: Light and Life crossing the old bridge in Zamora´s old city

=== Penitents ===
Thousands of fraternity members take part in the procession in true acts of faith. Traditionally only male members were admitted in most brotherhoods, but in the 21st century, women are entering these associations little by little, not without social debate.

Some of the members of the different brotherhoods walked dressed in their characteristic robes through the streets in penitential robes. Its members wear these penitential robes with conical hats, or "caperuzos" (referred to in other places as 'capirotes'), used to conceal the face of the wearer. These brothers carry processional candles and may walk the city streets barefoot.

=== The pasos ===
The pasos are authentic art works by Spanish artists such as Mariano Benlliure and the local Ramón Álvarez, depicting the most important events in the Passion and Death of Jesus. The pasos are physically carried in the shoulders of the cargadores (known in Andalusia as 'costaleros').

The pasos are set up and maintained by the hermandades and cofradías the religious brotherhoods that precedes the paso in the parades.

=== Music ===
The silence is only interrupted by the sound of drums and trumpets. The pasos are escorted by marching bands playing funeral music. The funeral march composed by Thalberg is widely performed and considered to be the unofficial hymn of the town of Zamora. Some of the parades have a more medieval set up, including polyphonic male choirs and drums. A popular music feature in Zamora is the Merlú, a couple of brothers that play trumpet and drums in the Early hours of Good Friday.

=== History ===
The earliest documented references to the celebration of the Passion in Zamora can be traced as far back as 1179, giving it a claim to be the oldest in Spain. The first cofradía to be founded is that of La Santa Vera Cruz or True Cross, dating of the 14th century. However, most of the pasos and brotherhoods were created in the 20th century, following the traditional models.

== Brotherhoods ==
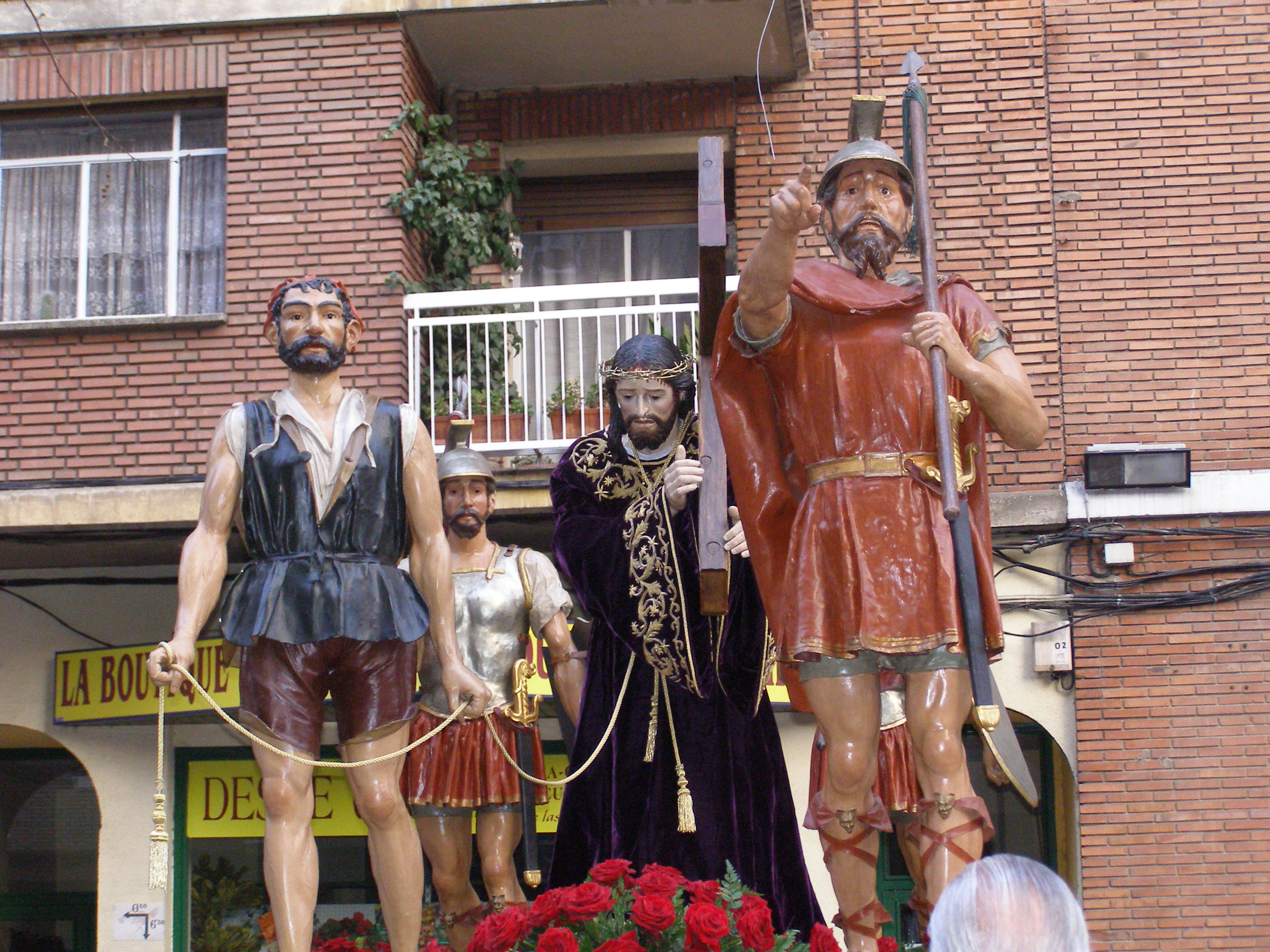
El CInco de Copas on Tres Cruces Avenue, Good Friday

- Cofradía de la Santa Vera Cruz, Disciplina y Penitencia: Founded in the 14th century, one of Spain’s oldest. 1,800 'cofrades' (or brothers) dressed in purple velvet robes. It walks the city street on Holy Thursday.
- Hermandad Penitencial del Santísimo Cristo del Espíritu Santo: Its 850 brothers walk the streets on Friday of Sorrows, dressed in a monk-like white robe with hood. Founded in 1975.
- Hermandad Penitencial de Nuestro Señor Jesús, Luz y Vida: More than 900 members of this fraternity, accompany the pasos on Saturday before Palm Sunday, dressed in a monk-like white hooded robe. Established in 1988.
- Real Cofradía de Jesús en su Entrada Triunfal en Jerusalén: Commemorates the triumphant arrival of Jesus at Jerusalem. Its 70 members (dressed in a white satin robe with pink satin 'caperuzo') accompany the town's children bearing palms on Palm Sunday. Founded in 1948. The locals refer to it as La Borriquita, alluding to the donkey depicted with the Lord on the paso.
- Hermandad de Jesús en su Tercera Caída: Created in 1942. On Monday, some 1,300 brothers dressed in a white satin robe and white satin conical hat with black satin cape. Monday of Holy Week.
- Hermandad Penitencial del Stmo. Cristo de la Buena Muerte: On Monday of Holy Week its nearly 400 members walk the city streets dressed in a white monk-like robe. Founded in 1974.
- Cofradía de Jesús del Vía Crucis: Its 1,200 members go around the streets on Tuesday dressed in a white robe with a purple 'caperuzo'. Created in 1941. Tuesday of Holy Week.
- Hermandad Penitencial de las Siete Palabras: More than 850 members (male and female). Walks the street on Tuesday. Founded in 1968. White robe with a green corduroy conical hat.
- Hermandad del Santísimo Cristo de las Injurias or El Silencio (The Silence): On Holy Wednesday, its 2,300 members (dressed in a white robe and red velvet 'caperuzo') and the people of Zamora swear to keep silence in the Cathedral of Zamora, Spain. Established in 1925.
- Hermandad de Penitencia del Stmo. Cristo del Amparo or Las capas pardas (The brown capes) Another remarkable parades the streets later on Wednesday of Holy Week. Its 150 members, dressed in the traditionals brown capes from the nearby village of Aliste (Spanish: capa alistana) walk the streets to the sound of traditional instruments such as the euphonium, dimly lit by their lanterns. Created in 1956.
- Sección de Damas de la Virgen de la Esperanza: Its 1,000 female and 200 male members accompany the statue of the Virgin on Maundy Thursday. The ladies, dressed in mourning clothes with Spanish haircombs or 'peinetas' and 'mantillas'. The men, in satin white robe and 'caperuzo' with green cape. Founded in 1960.
- Penitente Hermandad de Jesús Yacente: The Laying Jesus brotherhood have their procession on the night of Maundy Thursday, carrying an impressive 17th century statue of Christ and singing the emotional Miserere after midnight. 925 members, dressed in a white robe and conical hat, with a purple sash. Established in 1941. This is one of the most popular processions.
- Cofradía de Jesús Nazareno (Vulgo Congregación): Worthy of special mention on Good Friday with emotional moments, such as the appearance of the Camino del Calvario by Justo Fernández. This paso is known by locals as the Cinco de Copas, named after the 5 cups playing card of the Spanish deck because the figures on the scene are grouped like the cups in the card. Another impressive moment is the famous reverence paid by the other pasos to the Virgen de la Soledad by Ramón Álvarez on Tres Cruces Avenue – at this moment enthusiastic applause breaks forth from the crowd. Approx. 4,900 members wearing old-looking black robes and hood; founded in 1651.
- Real Cofradía del Santo Entierro: Its 2,200 members -dressed in black velvet robe and 'caperuzo'- accompany famous scenes by Ramón Álvarez and Mariano Benlliure on Good Friday. Established in 1593.
- Cofradía de Nuestra Madre de las Angustias: Having their procession on Good Friday, its 3,674 members, men and women walk the streets of Zamora accompanying the two pasos, one by Ramón Álvarez. The men are dressed in a white robe with black velvet conical hat; the women in mourning clothes. Created in 1585.

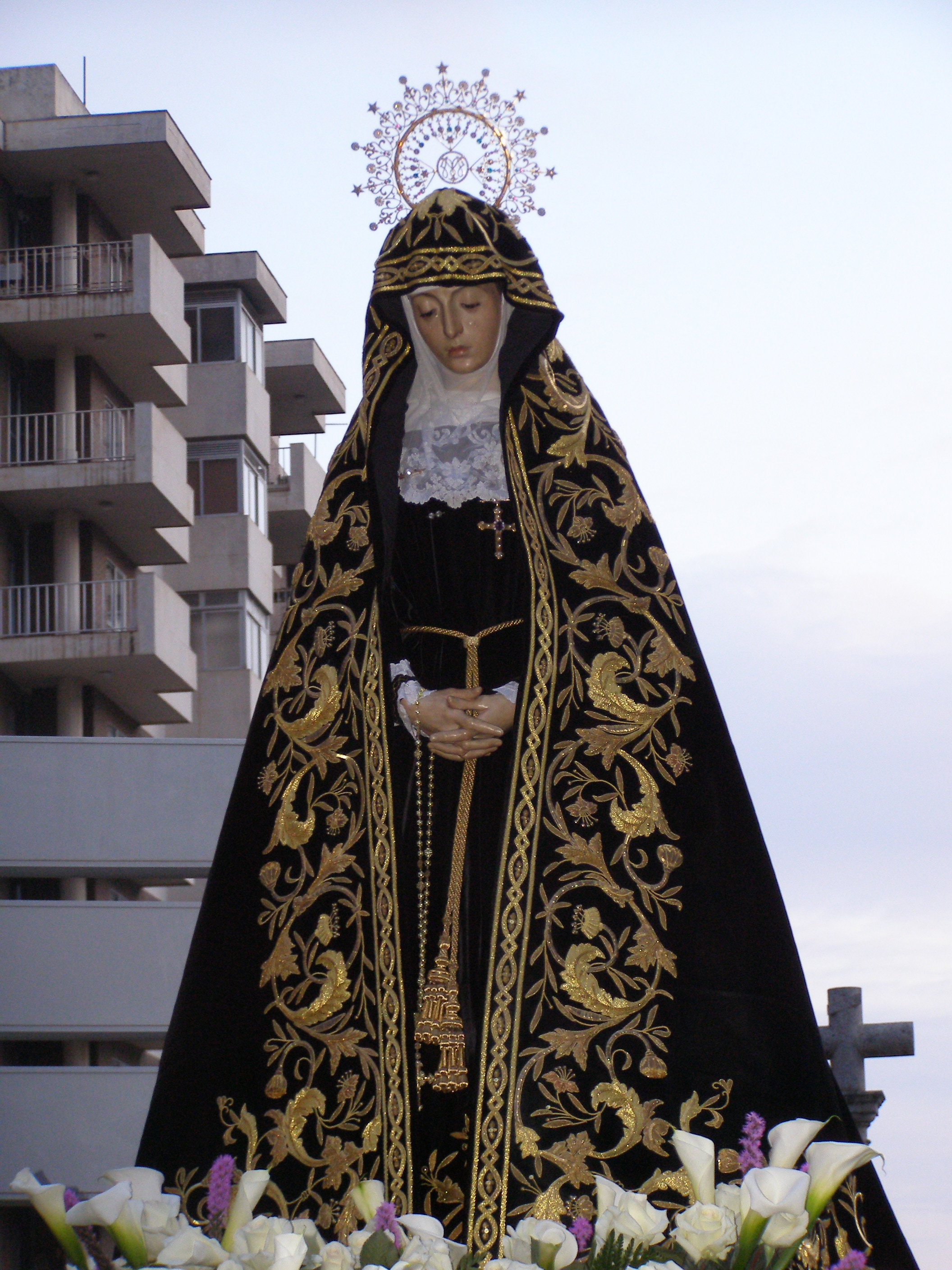
Virgen de la Soledad on Tres Cruces Avenue, Good Friday

- Sección de Damas de la Virgen de la Soledad: 3,000 women accompany the Virgin through the streets of Zamora on Holy Saturday, dressed in a black cape from head to toe. Second procession featuring the Virgen de la Soledad by Ramón Álvarez. Founded in 1948.
- Cofradía de la Santísima Resurrección: 500 and 1,500 women on Easter Sunday or Resurrection Day witness the Virgin welcome Ramón Álvarez's image of Jesus. Founded in the 16th century. No specific robe.

== See also ==
- Holy Week in Spain

== Bibliography ==
- Illana Gutiérrez, Laura y Fernández Ferrero, Alberto (2011). "Semana Santa en Zamora". Zamora, Illana Fernández C. B. OCLC 776421154
- Mateos Rodríguez, Miguel A. (1995). ZAMORA en Mateos Rodríguez, Miguel A. (Ed.) "Semana Santa en Castilla y León". Junta de Castilla y León, Consejería de Cultura y Turismo y Edilesa. ISBN 84-8012-102-5
