= Penitente Hermandad de Jesús Yacente =

Catholic brotherhood in Spain

The Penitente Hermandad de Jesús Yacente (English: Penitent Brotherhood of Recumbent Jesus) is a brotherhood in Zamora, Spain, important in its Holy Week; they parade solemnly on the night of Holy Thursday.

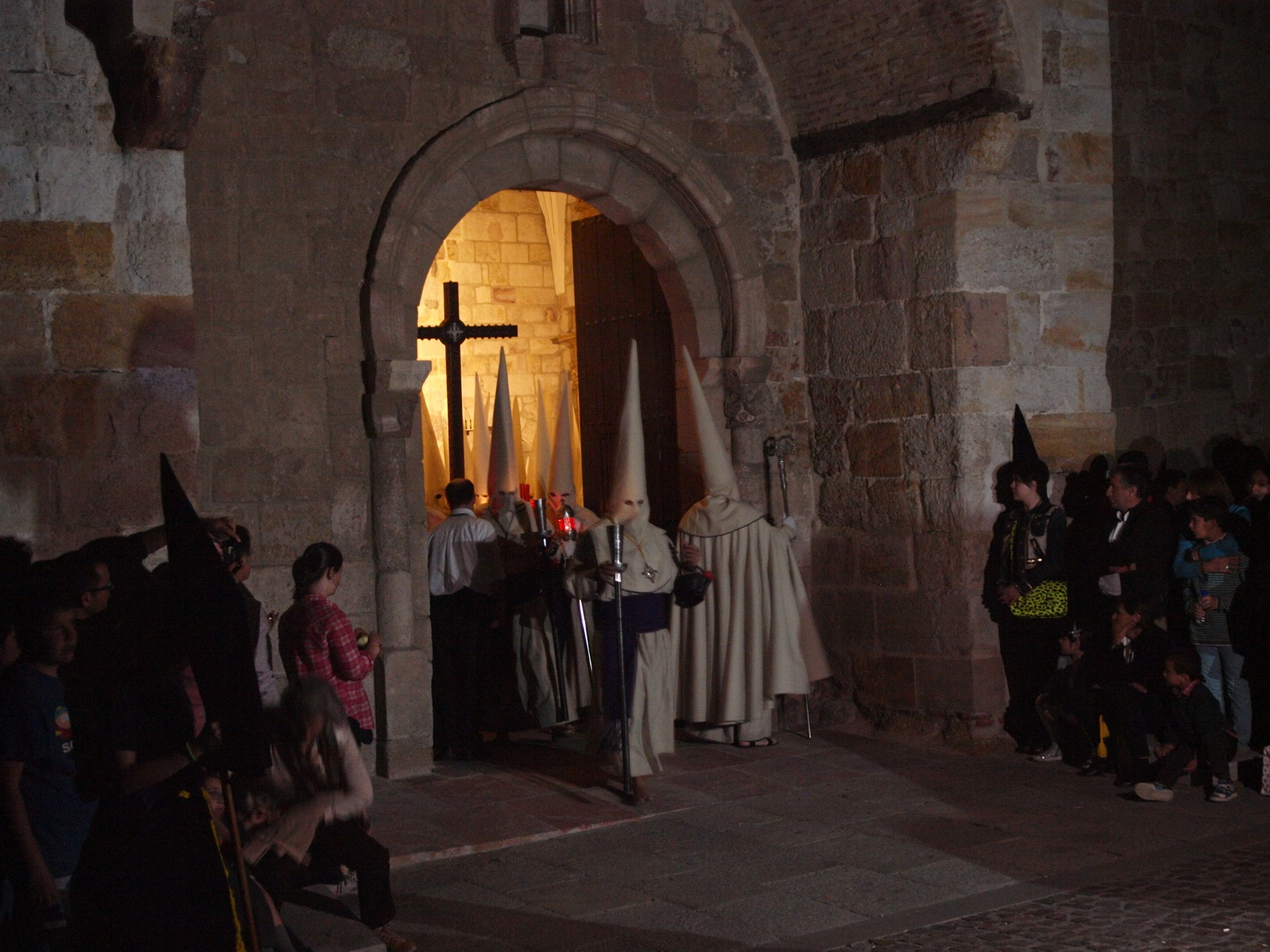
Beginning of the procession of the religious brotherhood of Lying Jesus

== History ==
The Brotherhood was founded in 1941, to venerate the image of Lying Christ, which was found abandoned in the Church of the Conception. Dionisio Alba Marcos promoted and brought to the new brotherhood to fruition. Since its first year the parade has become one of the highlights of Holy Week in Zamora.

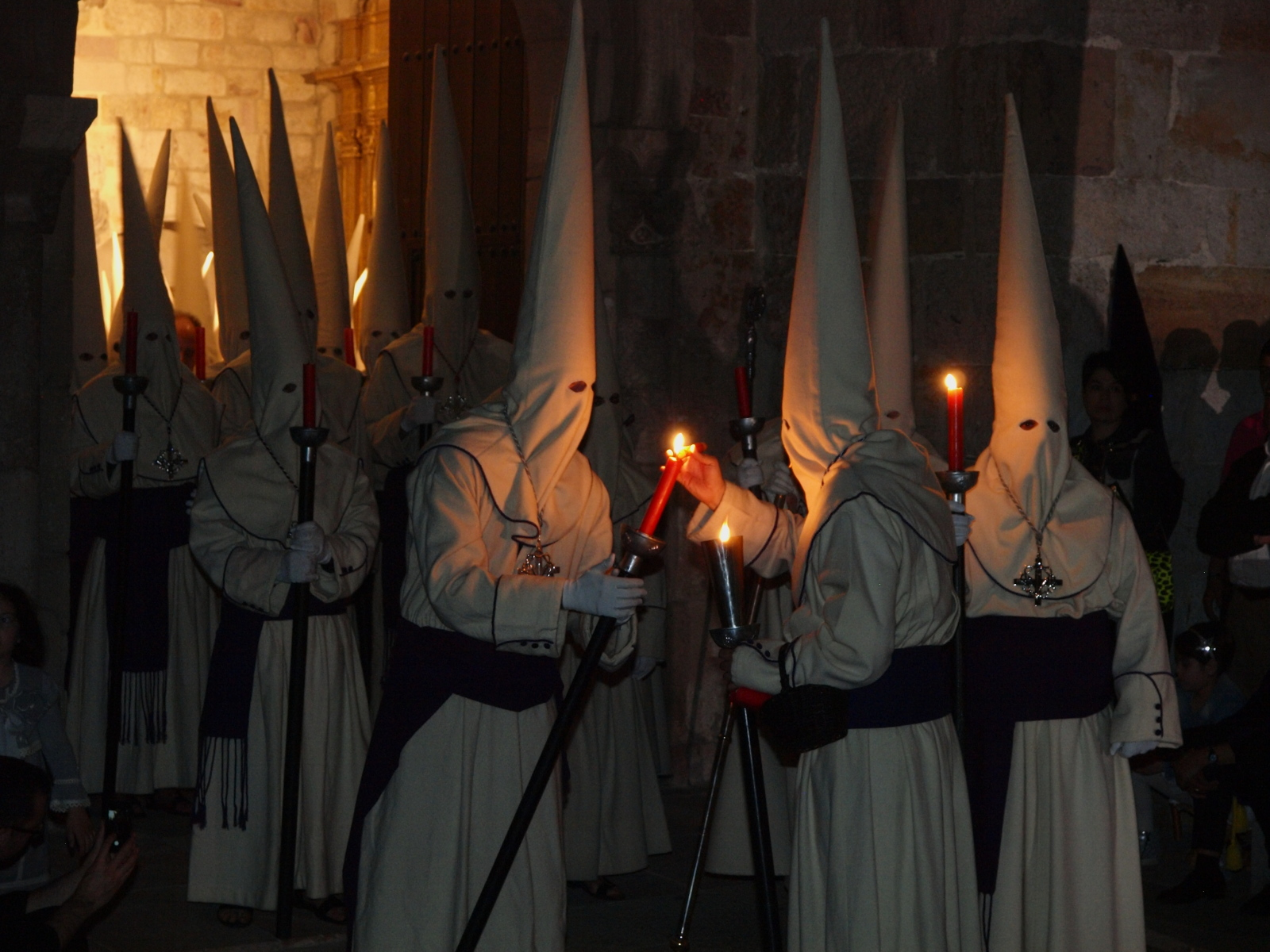

In 1952 the singing of the "Miserere" was implemented. As of 2013 the Alvarez headed the brotherhood, the first secular individual to hold this position.

== Image ==
The image of Lying Jesus, a notable work of the first half of the seventeenth century, was long attributed to Gregorio Fernández.

Navarro Talegón believes the image to be the work of Andrés Solanes and Jesús Urrea. Nicolás Enríquez claimed that the author could be Francisco de Fermín, around 1635.

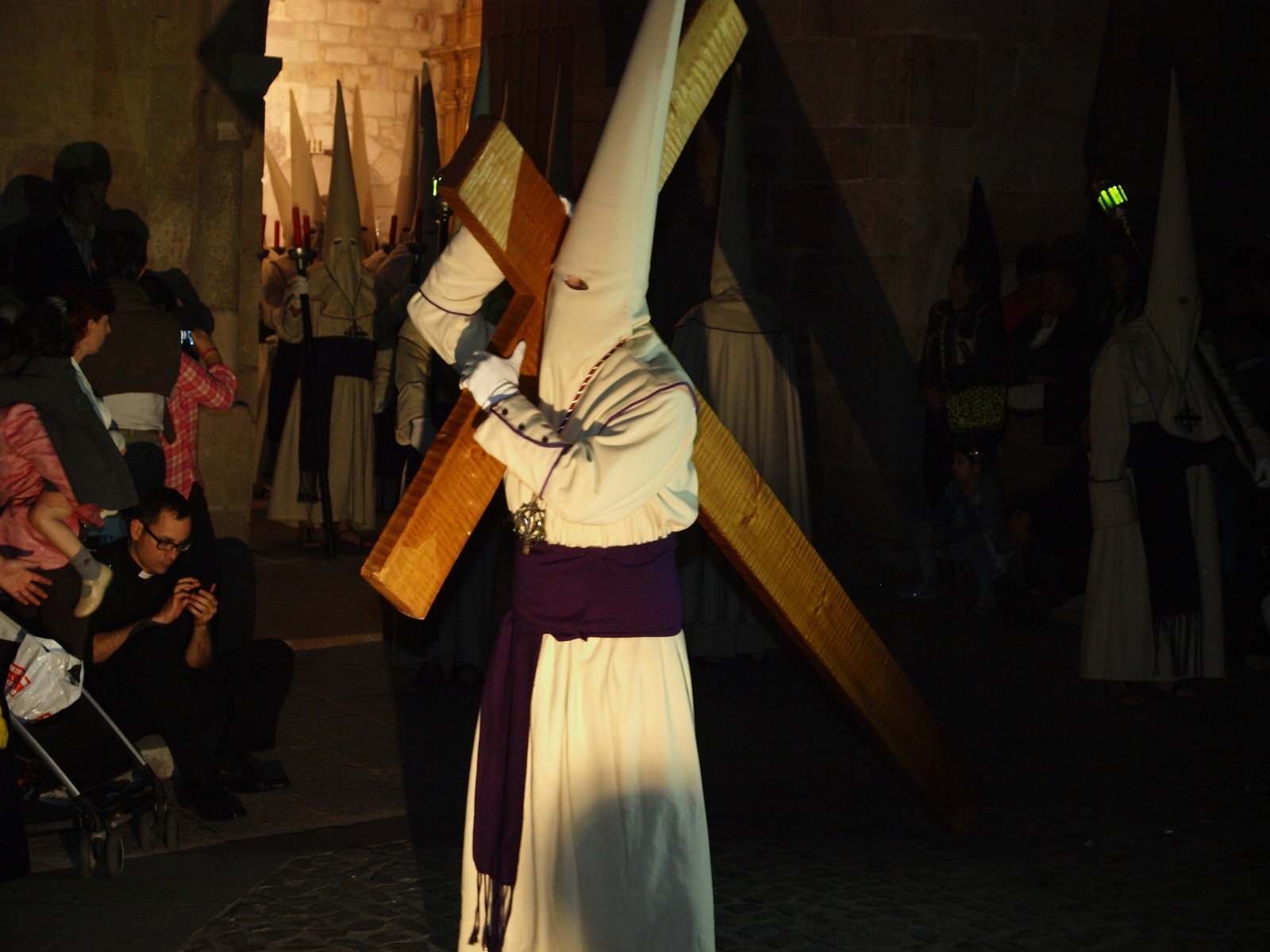

The image was preserved in the convent of Santo Domingo until 1809, when it was transferred to Nuestra Señora de la Victoria as a result of the War of Independence; later the church of Santiago del Burgo became its home until in 1853 it was transferred to the Church of the Conception, where it was found incidentally during the course of rehabilitation of the Church.

When the Church was closed in 1966, it was again transferred, to Santa Maria La Nueva this time, where remained as of 2013.

== Procession ==
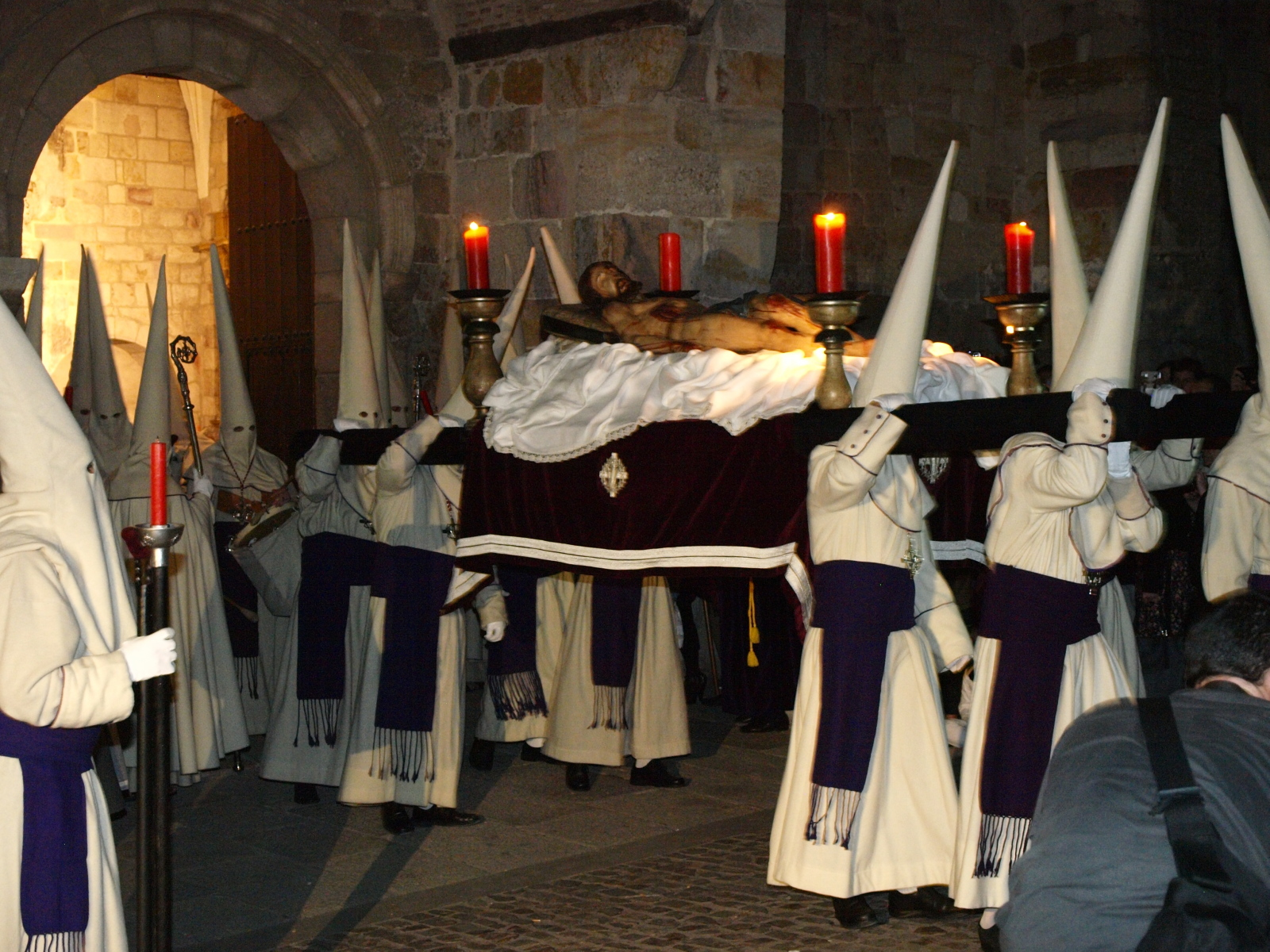
Image or Lying Jesus

The procession starts at 11 pm Holy Thursday and is inspired by the burial of a poor man in a Zamora's village: Jesus' body is covered with a shroud and is led to the grave in a simple stretcher, accompanied by its neighbors in complete silence, broken only by the bells of the viaticum and the slight tapping of the torches on the ground.

In addition to the image of Jesus, three wooden crosses are carried by the mayordomos (stewards) and one penitent brother.

The habit of the brotherhood and its long caperuz, are white serge, to which is added a sash and purple edges. The brothers wear Franciscan sandals, carrying a black wood torch, with metal bowl and a red wax candle.

=== The singing of the Miserere ===
The Miserere, a work of father Alcocer, was introduced in 1952. The singing is the highlight of the procession and one of the most representative of the Holy Week in Zamora; it takes place in the Plaza de Viriato (Viriato Square), close to the parade.

== Gallery ==
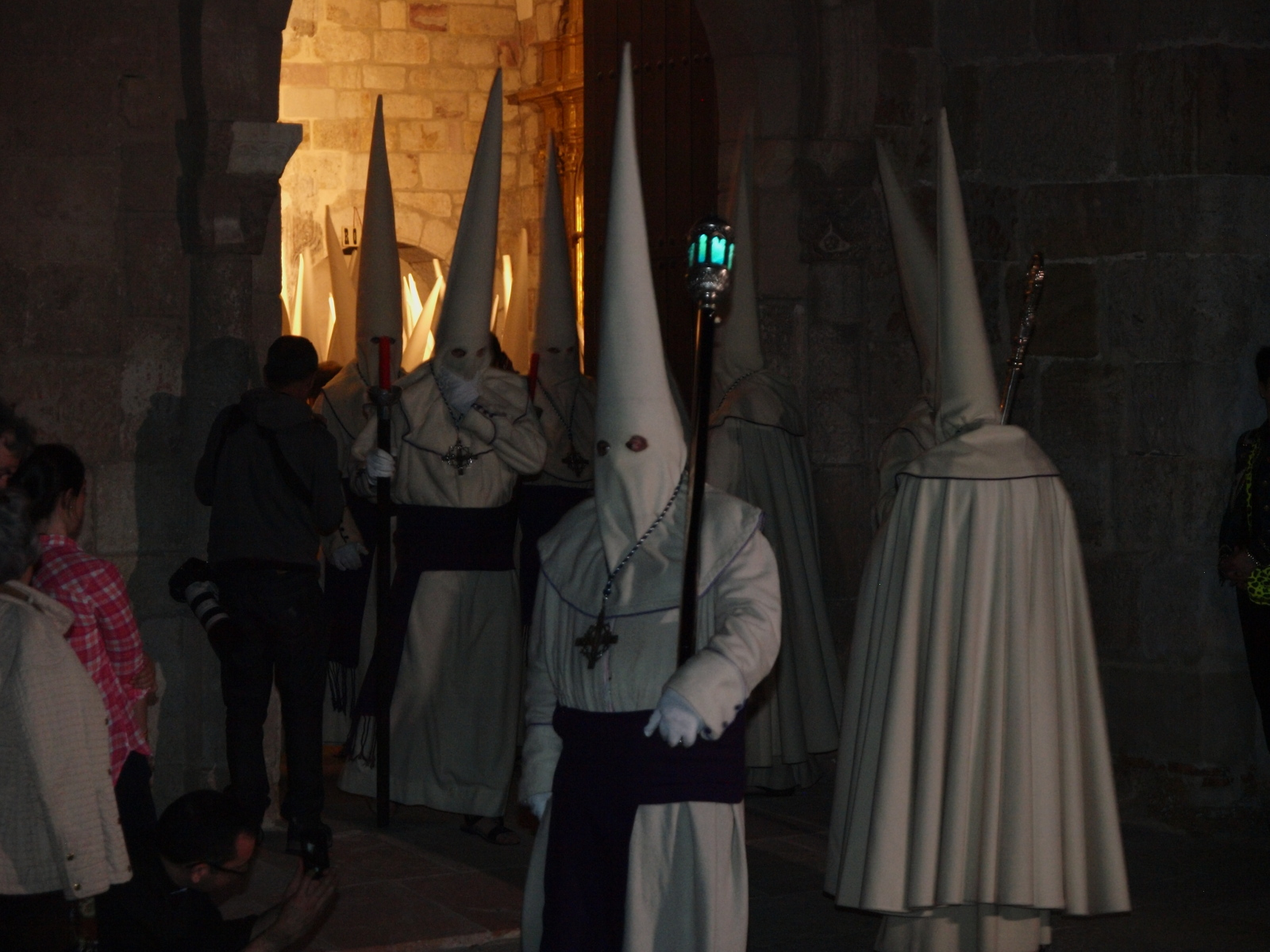

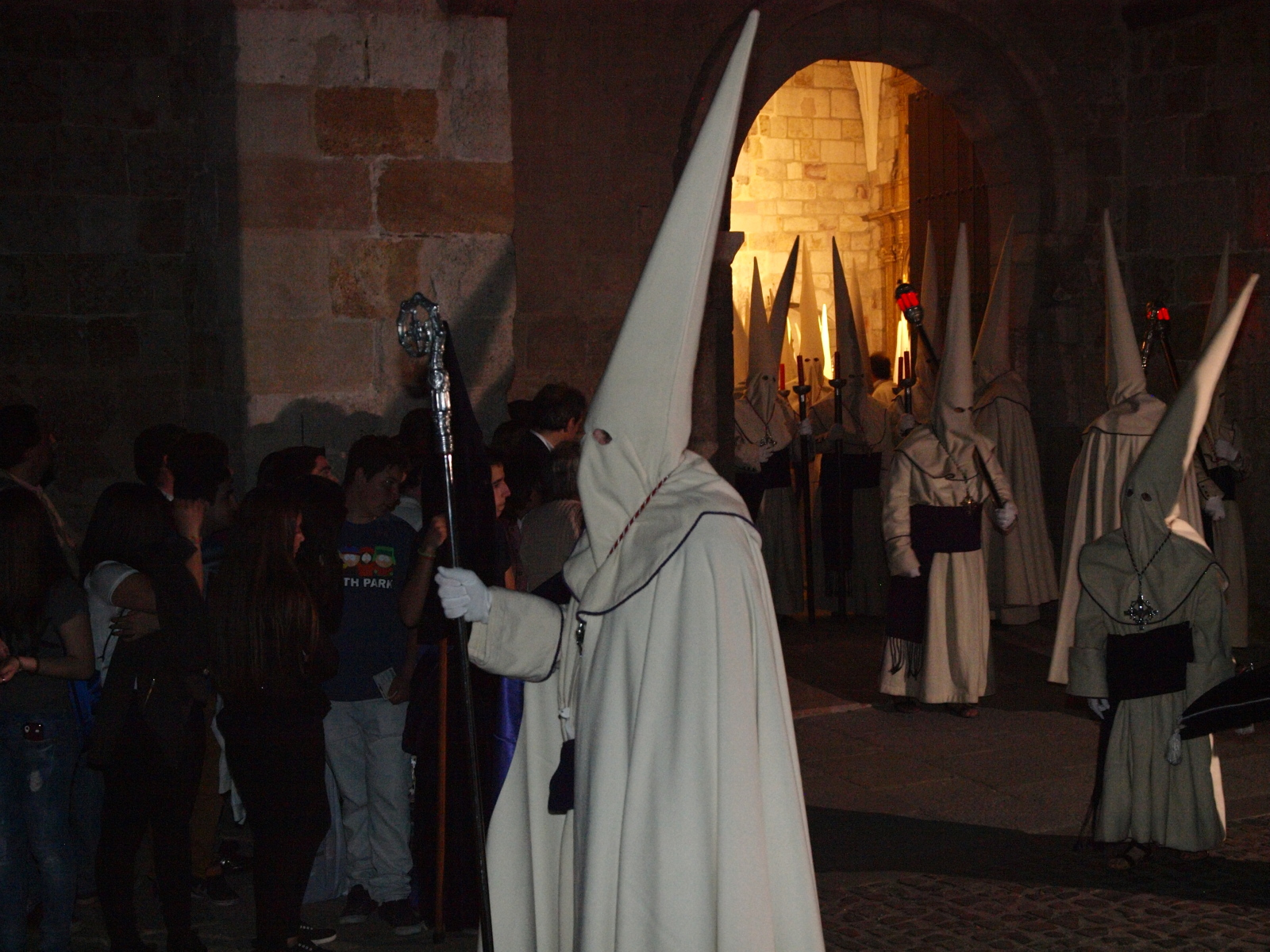

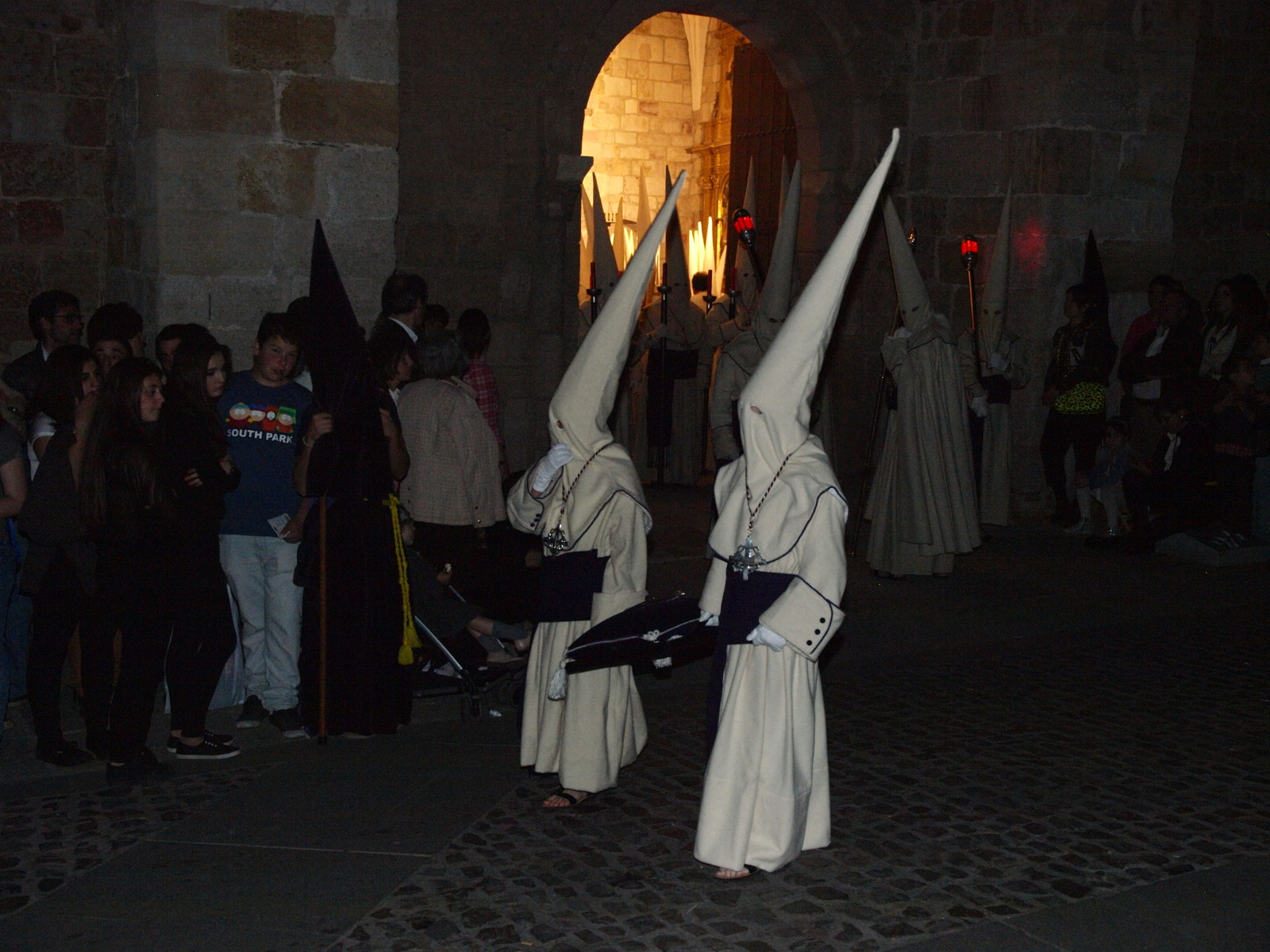

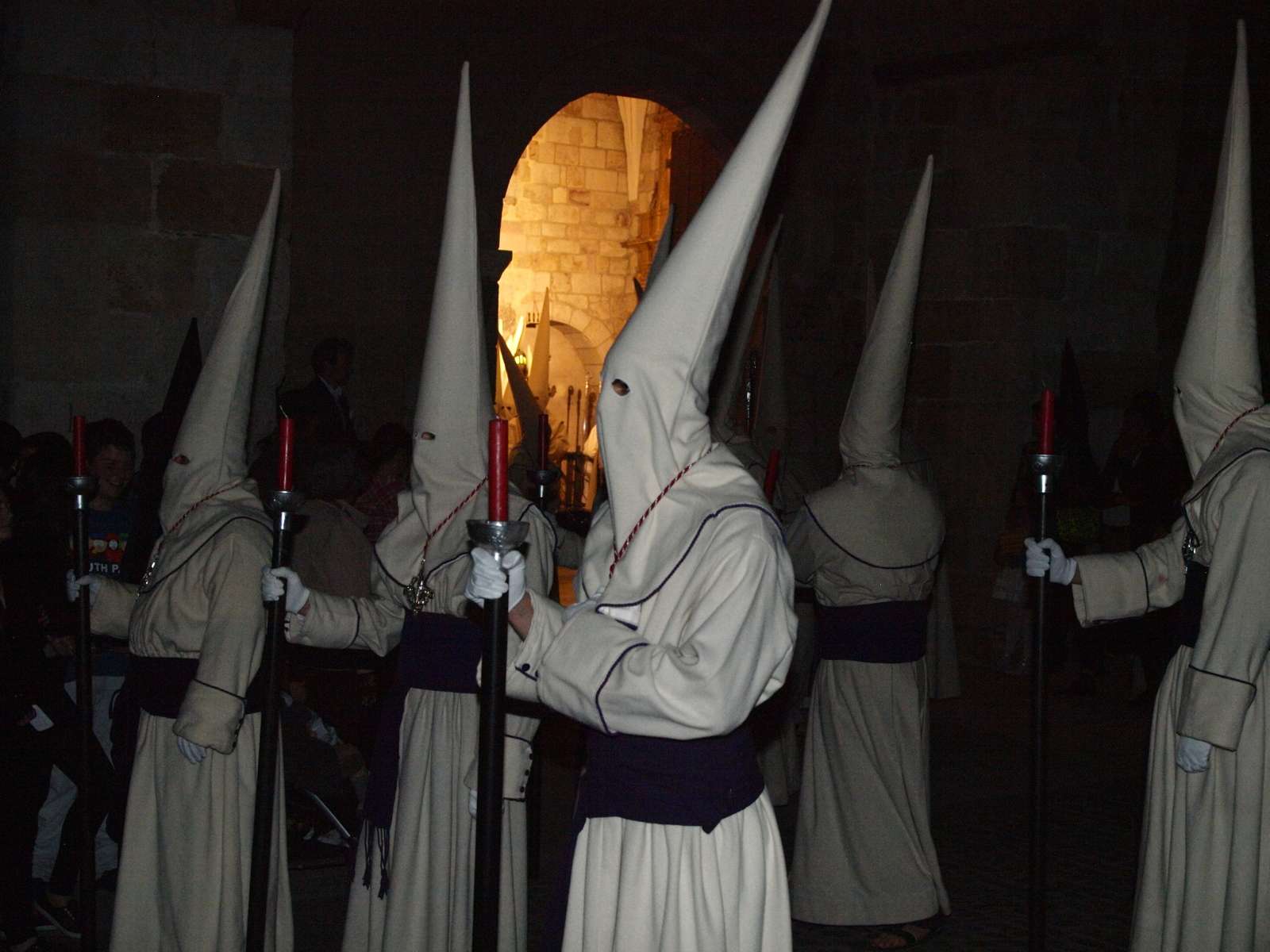

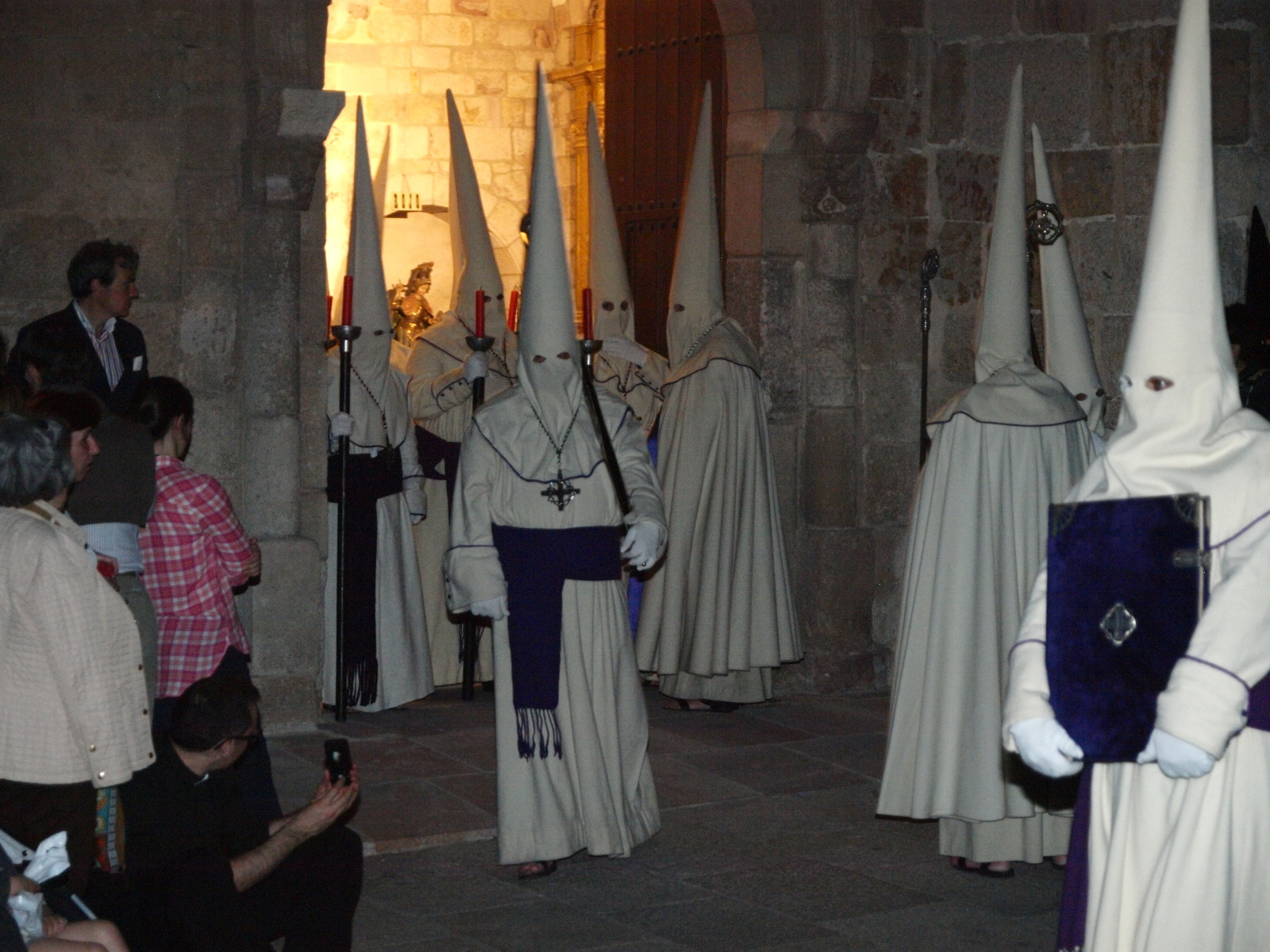

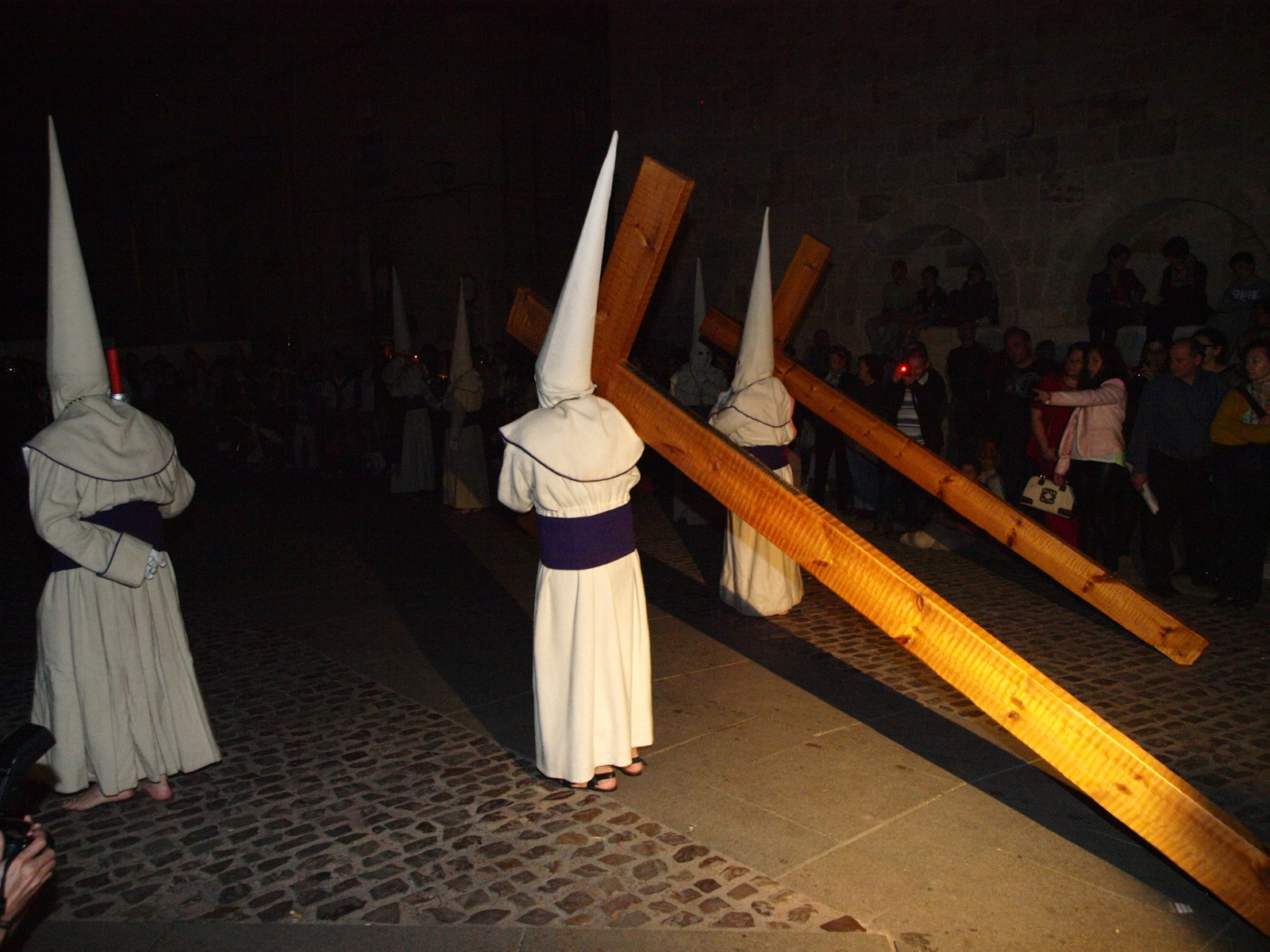

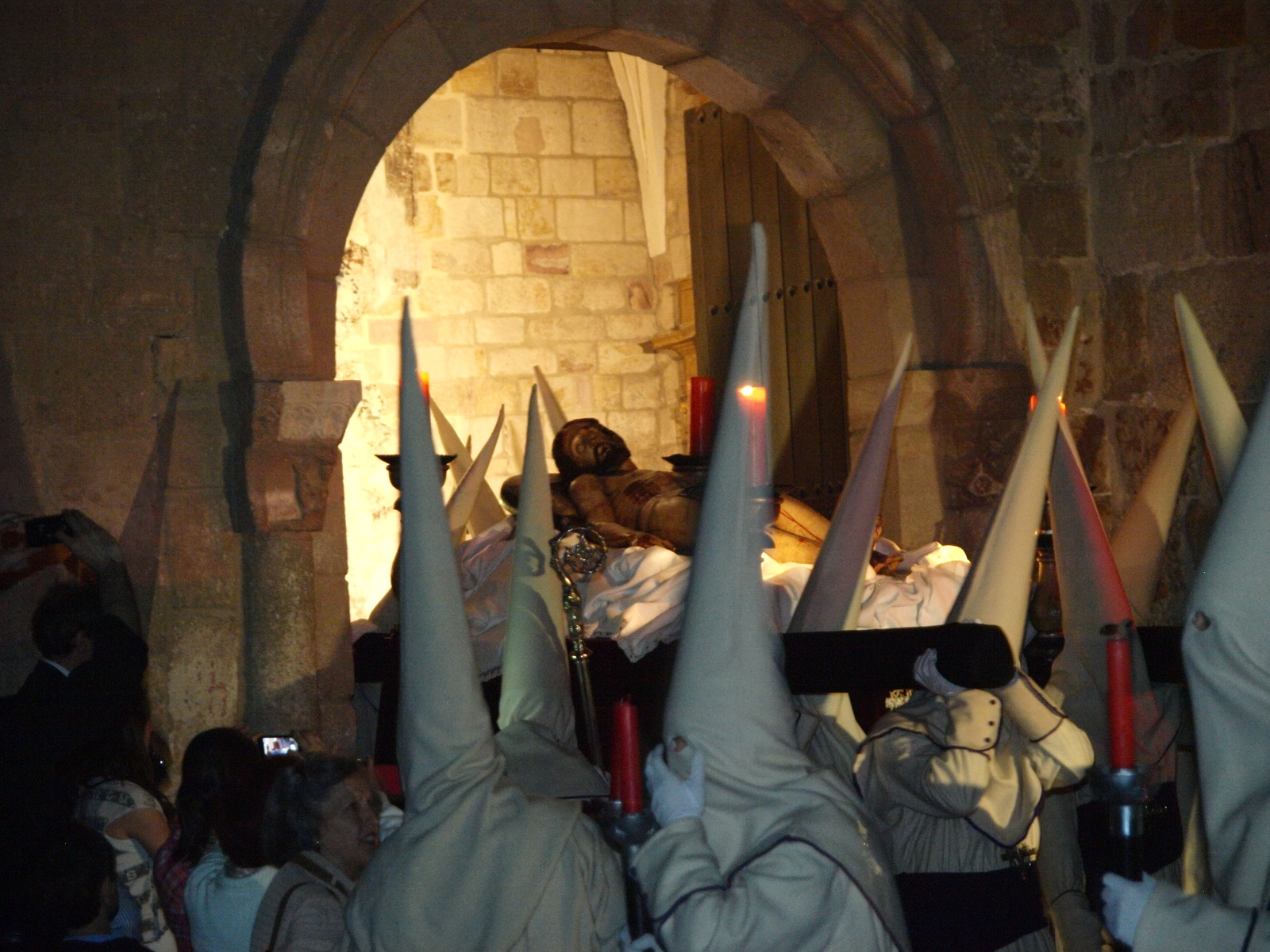

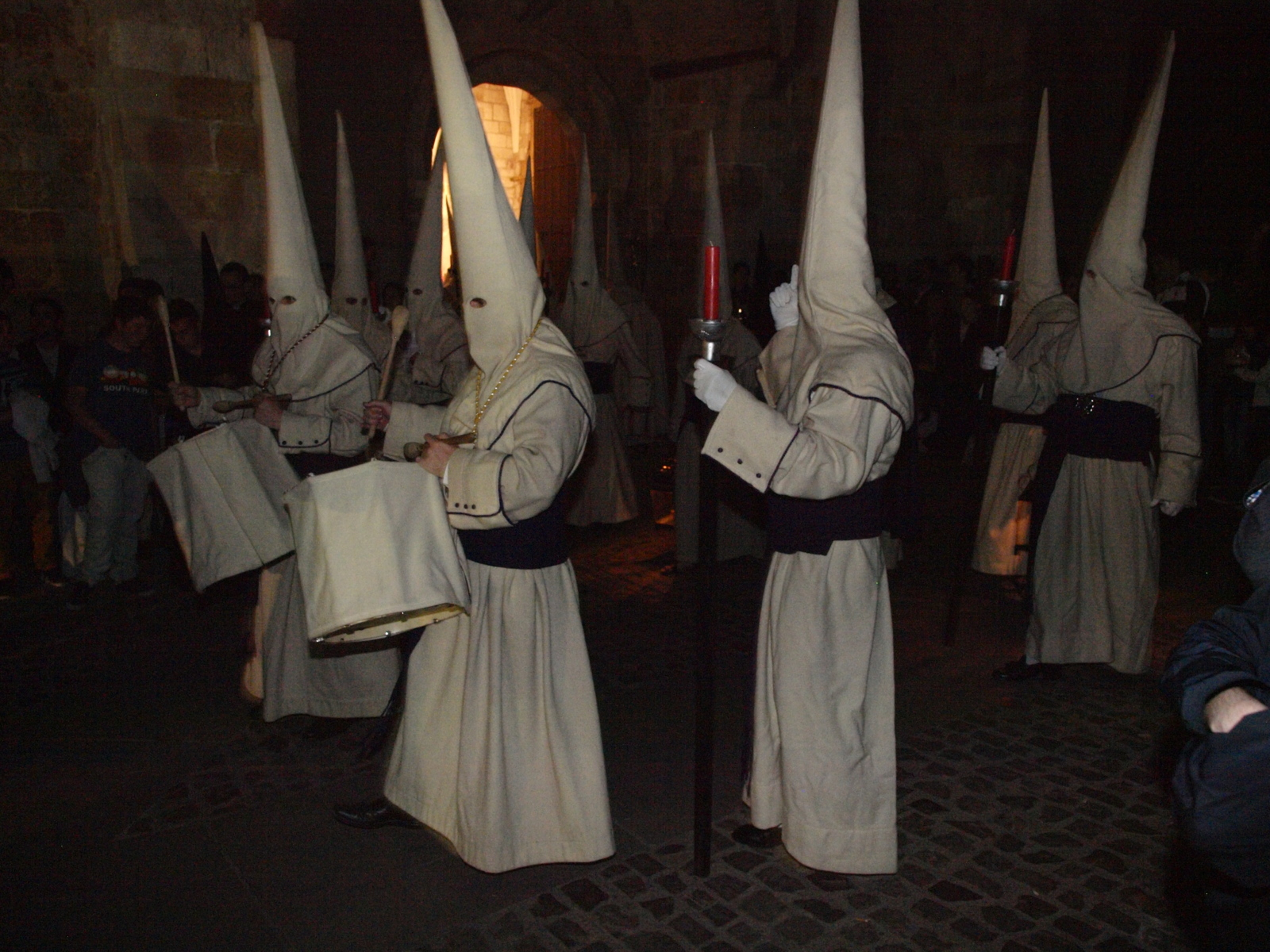
