= Church of María Magdalena, Zamora =

Santa María Magdalena de Zamora
- Iglesia de Santa María Magdalena (Spanish)
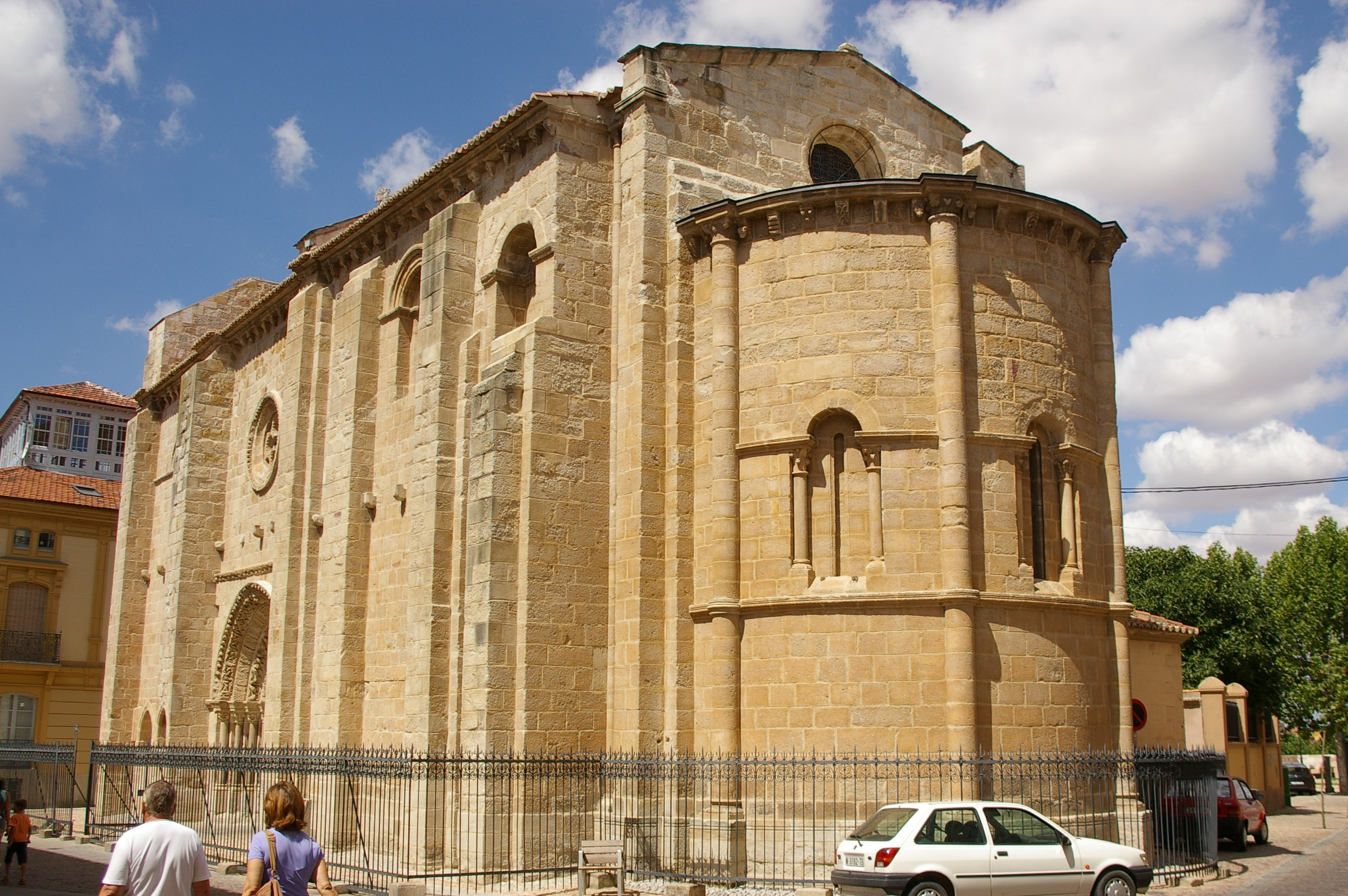

- Location within Spain
- 41.501318°N 5.750351°W
- Location: Zamora, Spain

Spanish Cultural Heritage
- Official name: Iglesia de Santa María Magdalena
- Type: Non-movable
- Criteria: Monument
- Designated: 1910
- Reference no.: RI-51-0000099

The Santa María Magdalena de Zamora is a church located in Zamora, Spain.

Built in the 12th century, La Magdalena is a small Romanesque church of the Knights Templar. At their suppression, it was given to the Order of Malta. The exterior features a deeply recessed south entrance, with circular arches and shafts, as well as ornate Romanesque work. The rose window, formed with small columns, is similar to the Temple Church in London. The interior includes canopied tombs dating to the 13th century, supported by spiral and fluted shafts. Against the north wall, there is a tomb under a canopy supported by three shafts. The sepulchre itself is plain, carved with a cross; the effigy of its occupant is carved, as if lying on a bed, out of a bold block of stone, and inserted in the wall; above this is the soul (in the shape of a head with wings) supported by angels.

== Conservation ==
It has been given the heritage listing Bien de Interés Cultural and has been protected since 1910.

== See also ==
- List of Bienes de Interés Cultural in the Province of Zamora
