= List of Bienes de Interés Cultural in the Province of Zamora =

This is a list of Bien de Interés Cultural landmarks in the Province of Zamora, Spain.

- Gate of Doña Urraca
- Church of Santa María Magdalena (Zamora)
- San Pedro de la Nave
