= Arcenillas =

Place in Castile and León, Spain

Coordinates: 41°27′N 5°41′W

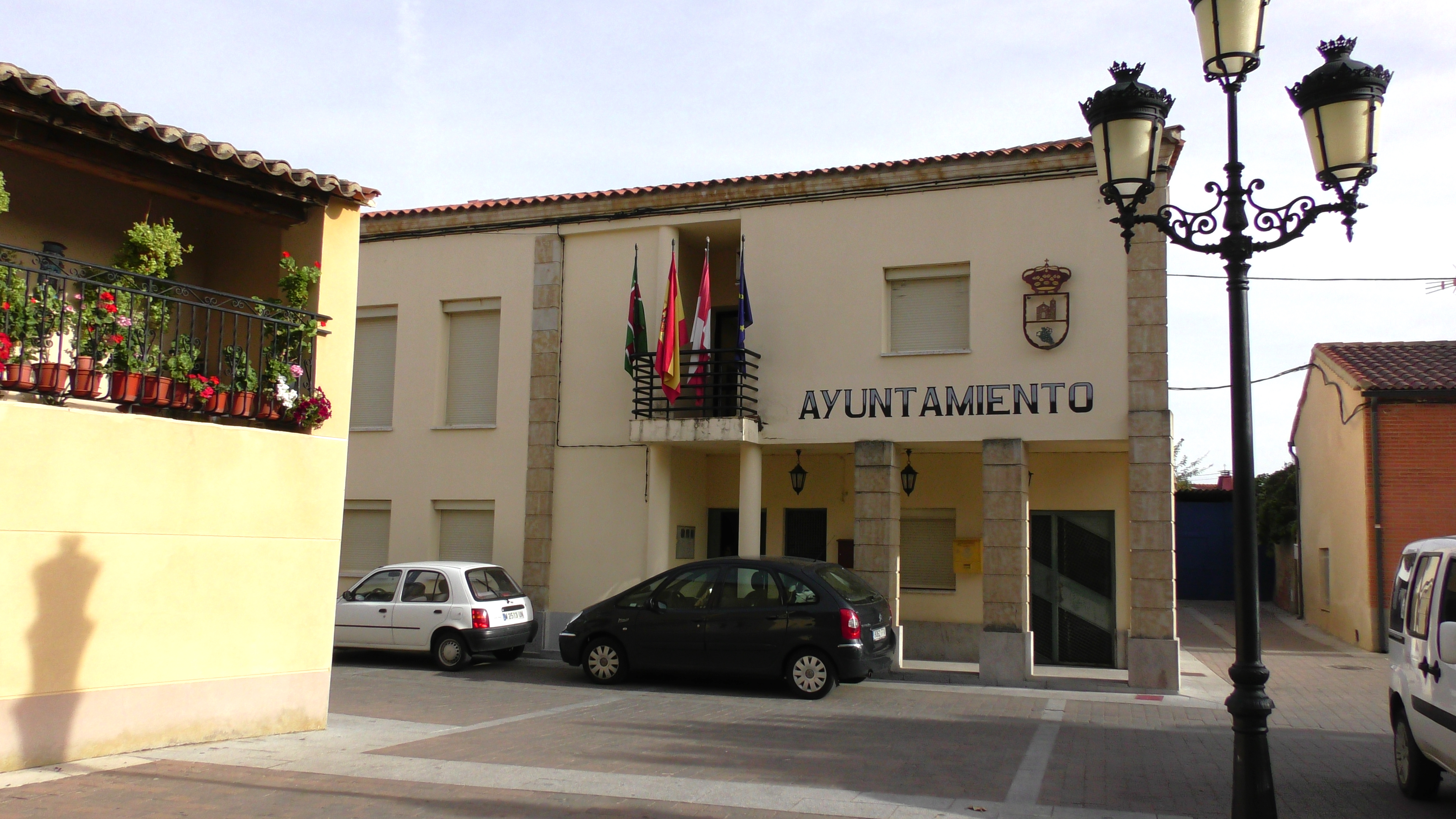
- Arcenillas City Hall

- Flag Coat of arms
- Interactive map of Arcenillas
- Country: Spain
- Autonomous community: Castile and León
- Province: Zamora
- Municipality: Arcenillas

Area
  - Total: 12 km^{2} (4.6 sq mi)

Population (2025-01-01)
  - Total: 450
  - Density: 38/km^{2} (97/sq mi)
- Time zone: UTC+1 (CET)
  - Summer (DST): UTC+2 (CEST)

Arcenillas is a municipality located in the province of Zamora, Castile and León, Spain. According to the 2004 census (INE), the municipality has a population of 309 inhabitants.

A collection of 11 Hispano-Flemish-style panels of the 15th century painted by Fernando Gallego have made the village notable.
