= Zamora, Spain =

Zamora
- Municipality
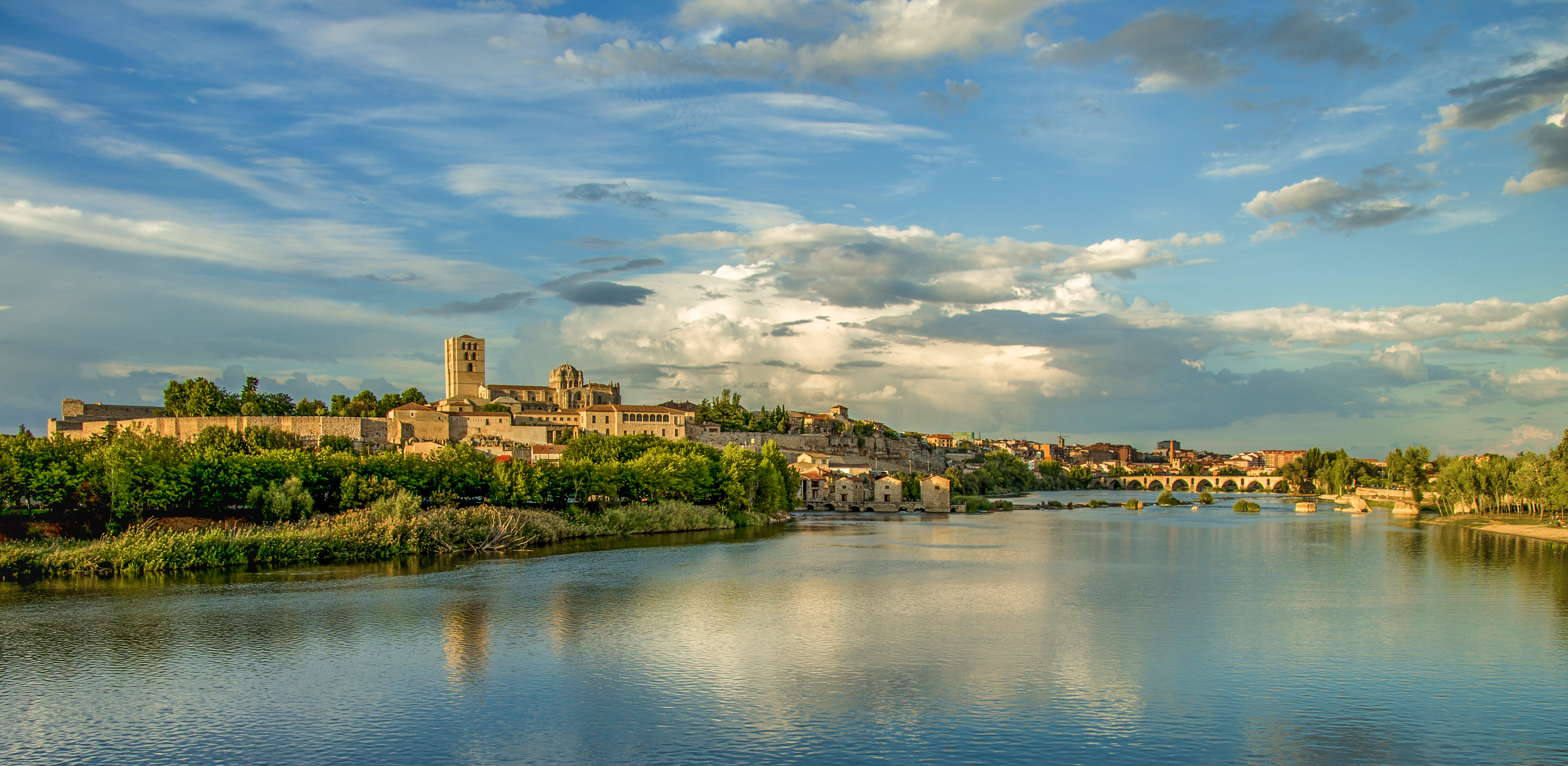
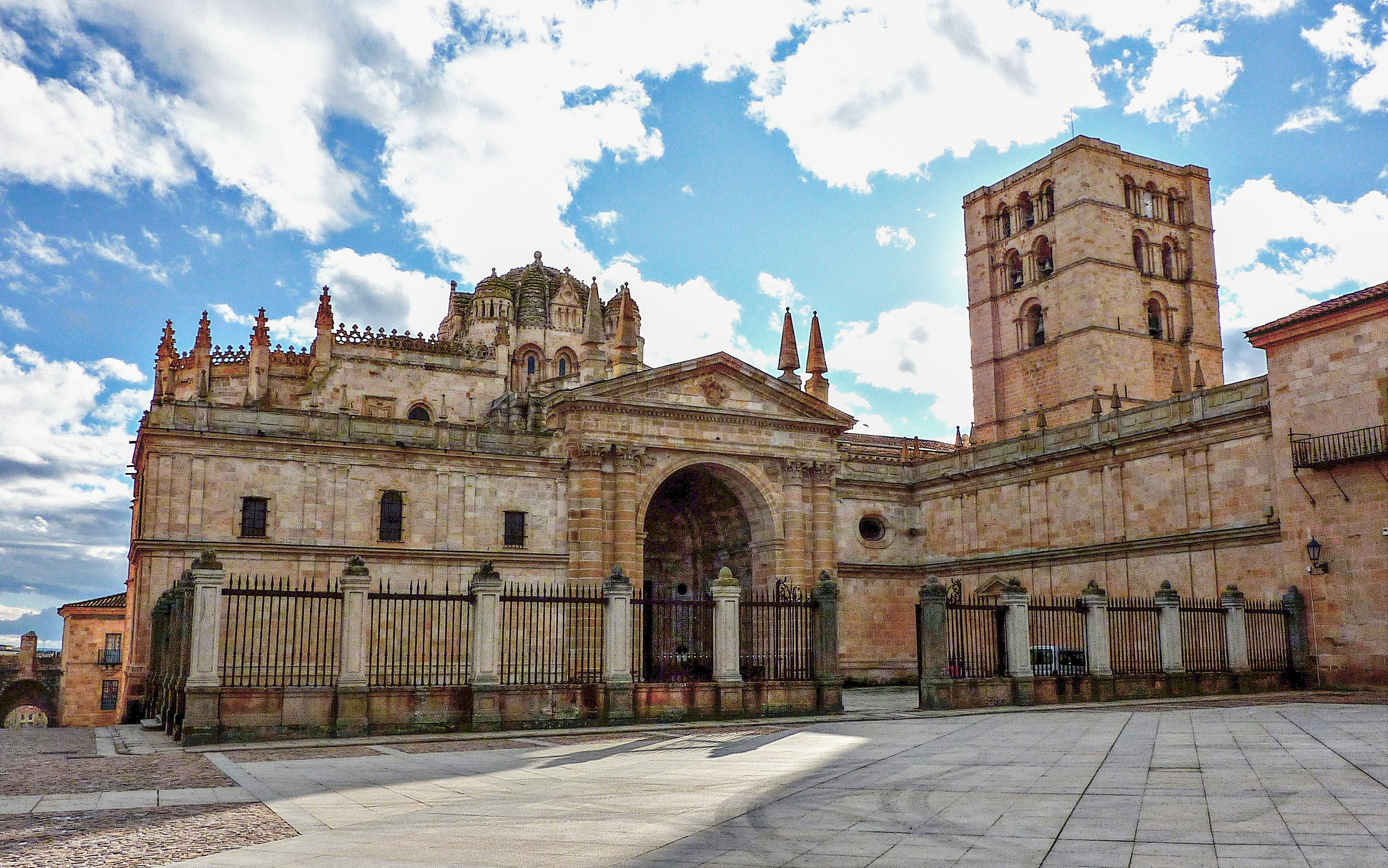
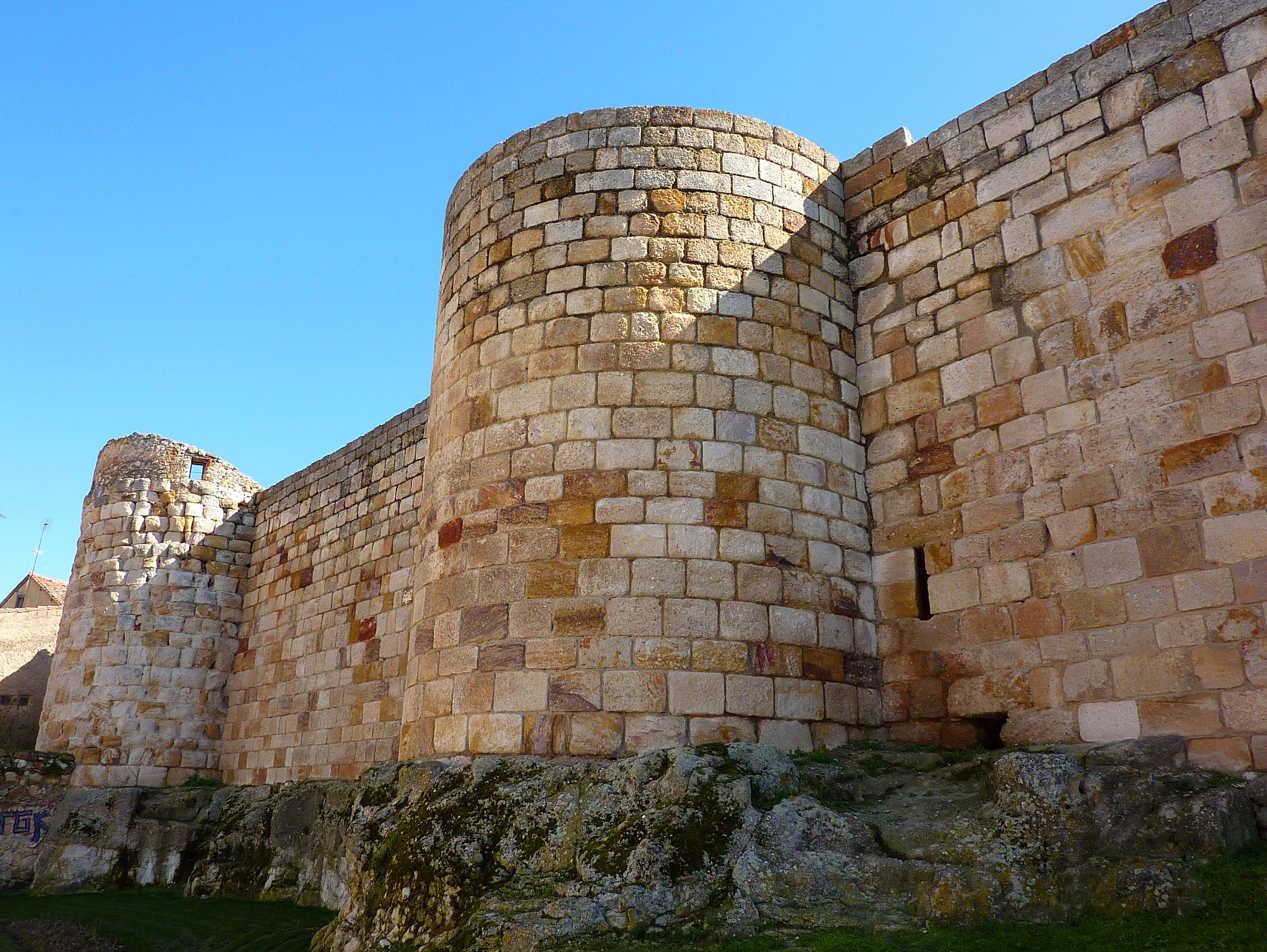
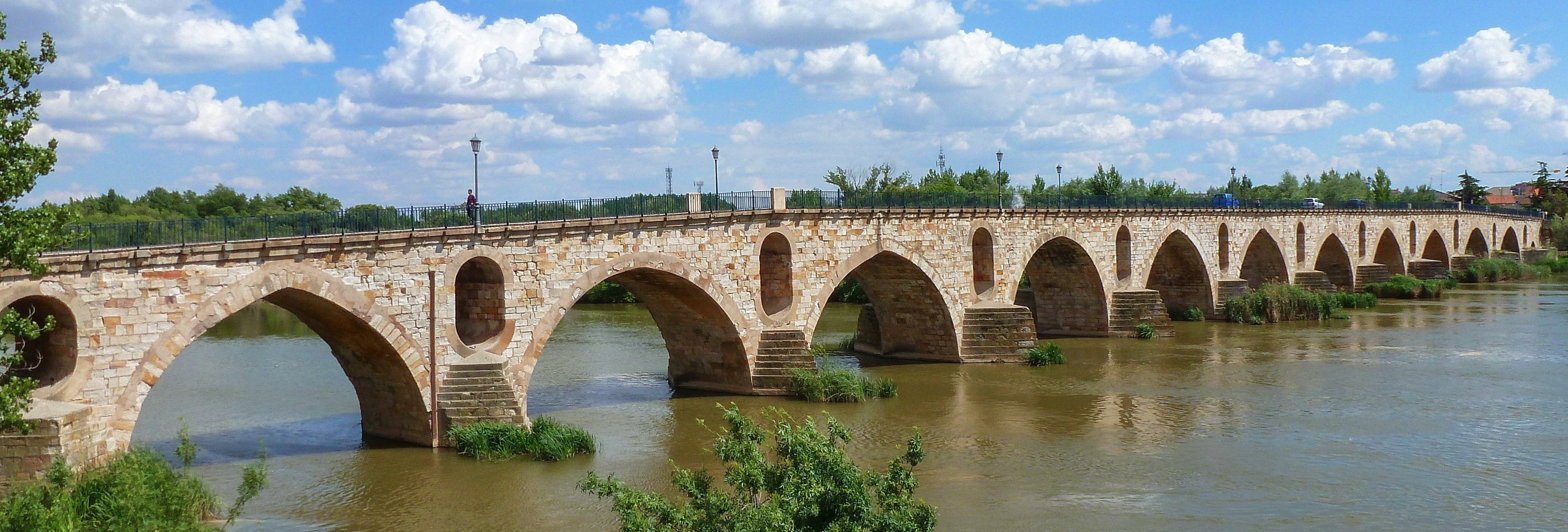
- Zamora over the Duero river Cathedral City walls Stone bridge

- Flag Coat of arms
- Location of Zamora
- Coordinates: 41°29′56″N 5°45′20″W
- Country: Spain
- Autonomous community: Castile and León
- Province: Zamora

Government
  - Type: Ayuntamiento
  - Body: Ayuntamiento de Zamora
  - Mayor: Francisco Guarido (IU)

Area
  - Total: 149.92 km^{2} (57.88 sq mi)
- Elevation: 652 m (2,139 ft)

Population (2025)
  - Total: 59,857
  - Density: 399.26/km^{2} (1,034.1/sq mi)
- Demonym(s): Zamorano, -a
- Time zone: UTC+1 (CET)
  - Summer (DST): UTC+2 (CEST)
- Postal code: 49001–49028
- Dialing code: 980

Zamora (Spanish: [θaˈmoɾa]) is a city and municipality in the autonomous community of Castile and León in Spain. It is the capital of the province of Zamora. The city straddles the Duero river. With a population of 59,857, it is the 7th-largest city in Castile and León.

With its 24 characteristic Romanesque style churches of the 12th and 13th centuries it has been called a "museum of Romanesque art". Zamora is the city with the most Romanesque churches in all of Europe. The most important celebration in Zamora is Holy Week.

Zamora is part of the natural comarca of Tierra del Pan and it is the head of the judicial district of Zamora.

== History ==
=== Antiquity ===
The city was founded early in the Bronze Age and was later occupied during the Iron Age by the Celtic people of the Vacceos who called it Ocalam.

After the Roman victory over the Lusitanian hero Viriathus the settlement was named by the Romans Occelum Durii or Ocellodurum (literally, "Eye of the Duero"). During Roman rule it was in the hands of the Vaccaei, and was incorporated into the Roman province of Hispania Tarraconensis. It was on the road from Emerita (modern Mérida) to Asturica Augusta (modern Astorga). (Ant. Itin. pp. 434, 439).

Two coins from the reign of the Visigothic king Sisebuto, show that it was known at the time as "Semure".

=== Middle Ages ===
Following the campaigns of Musa ibn Nusayr in the 710s in the context of the Umayyad conquest of the Iberian Peninsula, the town was conquered and a Berber garrison was left in the there, but following the Arab-Berber strifes, the territory was reportedly seized by Alfonso I of Asturias. Not much attention was paid however to the place in the chronicles from this period, as Asturian human resources at the time were mostly targeted at the Cantabrian coast and little is known about the inhabitants of the Duero Valley.

According to the chronicle of Al-Andalus by Isa ibn Ahmad al-Razi, Alfonso III of Asturias determined the Christian repopulation of the place in 280 AH (893–894 AD) (although the dates of 881, 899 and 910 AD have been also reported). A diocese and a bishop were established in the town in the early 10th century. Mozarab builders came from Toledo. The city became one of the most thriving Christian cities in Iberia in the early 10th century, possibly even passing León.

Zamora became the target of Ibn al-Qitt, who unsuccessfully tried to invade the city in 901 with help from Nafzāwa Berbers. It was also attacked several times during the Caliphal era, and Almanzor eventually seized the city in 966. The place returned to Christian control during the reign of Alfonso V of León.

Since the early 11th century, with the repopulation works by Raymond of Burgundy, the place saw planned repopulating efforts. A new perimeter of city walls was also erected in the 11th century. The population intramuros included the nobles and regal officers, the clergy, Frank settlers from Gascogne, Poitou and Provence who had settled in the city during the time of Raymond of Burgundy, settlers of Asturian, Leonese and Galician origin, as well as some Mozarabs. Zamora was granted a fuero in 1208.

The most notable historic episode in Zamora was the assassination outside the city walls of the king Sancho II of Castile in 1072. Some decades before, king Ferdinand I of León had divided his kingdoms between his three sons. To his daughter, Doña Urraca, he had bequeathed the "well fortified city of Zamora" (or "la bien cercada" in Spanish). All three sons warred among themselves, till the ultimate winner, Sancho, was left victorious. Zamora, under his sister who was allied with Leonese nobles, resisted. Sancho II of Castile, assisted by El Cid, laid siege to Zamora. King Sancho II was murdered by a duplicitous noble of Zamora, Bellido Dolfos, who tricked the king into a private meeting. After the death of Sancho, Castile reverted to his deposed brother Alfonso VI of León. The event was commemorated by the Portillo de la Traición (Treason Gate).

In the late middle ages, Zamora was one of the 17 cities (18 after the inclusion of Granada) that enjoyed a vote at the Cortes of the Crown of Castile, actually speaking on behalf of all of Galicia since the early 15th century (Galicia did not have any city with representation until the 17th century).

Zamora was also the scene of fierce fighting in the 15th century, during the conflict between the supporters of Isabella the Catholic and Juana la Beltraneja. The Spanish proverb, No se ganó Zamora en una hora, literally, Zamora wasn't won in an hour, is a reference to these battles. It is the Spanish equivalent of the English proverb "Rome wasn't built in a day."

During the 12th century, the city was extraordinarily important for its strategic position in the wars between the Kingdom of León and the Almoravids and Almohads. As a result, the city preserves many churches and buildings from that time. In the 1140s and 1150s it was ruled by Prince Ponce Giraldo de Cabrera, who has a street named after him in the city today.

Henry IV granted Zamora the epithet of "most noble and most loyal city".

Zamora's Jewish community came to an end with the expulsion of 1492. At that time the city was one of the principal crossing points into Portugal, with chroniclers reporting that around 30,000 Jews passed through Zamora toward Miranda do Douro. Some former residents later returned as conversos. Soon after the expulsion, the Crown granted the community's "Great Synagogue" to the city to be converted into the church of San Sebastián, and in 1493 confirmed the donation to the local confraternity for use as a hospital and shelter for the poor. Records indicate that the synagogue was eventually dismantled and its materials reused. Because of its frontier location Zamora also became a center of smuggling, leading the Crown between 1493 and 1495 to launch investigations into property, debts, and contraband left behind or carried out by the exiles.

=== Modern period ===
The city leaned towards support to the Revolt of the Comuneros in the northern hemisphere Fall of 1520. By September 1520, the corregidor appointed by the Crown was ousted and replaced by an alcalde designated by the community. However, the hopes of the rebels across the Crown of Castile were handed a crushing blow at the Battle of Villalar on 23 April 1521.

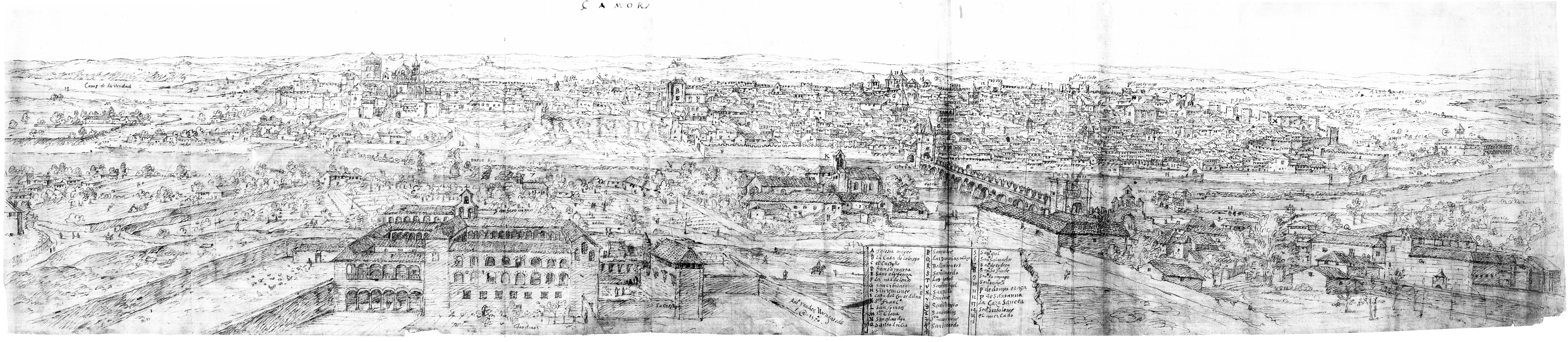
View of the city of Zamora c. 1570, drawn by Anton van den Wyngaerde.

In the Early Modern Period, the city lost its political and economic relevance and suffered emigration, especially to South America (where many other cities called Zamora were founded).

According to the Godoy Census, the city had a population of 10,171 in 1797.

During the Spanish Civil War (1936–1939), the savagery of the repression against leftists and liberals is captured in Ramón Sender Barayón's A Death in Zamora, which tells of the extrajudicial murder of his mother, Amparo Barayón, the wife of the famous novelist Ramon J. Sender.

== Geography ==
Located in the north-west of the Iberian Peninsula, the city lies at about 649 metres above sea level, around a rocky hill near the Duero river some 50 kilometres (31 mi) upstream of the Portuguese border.

The municipality expands across a total area of 149.28 km^{2}.

=== Climate ===
Zamora has a cold semi-arid climate (Köppen: BSk), with cool winters and hot summers. Precipitation is mainly recorded during two seasons, spring and autumn, with summer characterized by droughts. The highest temperature ever recorded is 41.8 °C (105 °F) on 14 July 2022 while the minimum stood at −13.4 °C (8 °F) on 16 January 1945. Fog is common during winters, frequently decreasing morning temperatures.

Climate data for Zamora (1991–2022), extremes (1920-present)
Month	Jan	Feb	Mar	Apr	May	Jun	Jul	Aug	Sep	Oct	Nov	Dec	Year
Record high °C (°F)	18.9 (66.0)	23.5 (74.3)	26.7 (80.1)	30.6 (87.1)	35.1 (95.2)	39.9 (103.8)	41.8 (107.2)	41.1 (106.0)	38.0 (100.4)	33.2 (91.8)	22.6 (72.7)	20.0 (68.0)	41.8 (107.2)
Mean daily maximum °C (°F)	8.6 (47.5)	11.7 (53.1)	15.7 (60.3)	18.0 (64.4)	22.5 (72.5)	27.8 (82.0)	31.1 (88.0)	30.5 (86.9)	25.9 (78.6)	19.6 (67.3)	12.8 (55.0)	9.2 (48.6)	19.5 (67.0)
Daily mean °C (°F)	4.9 (40.8)	6.4 (43.5)	9.6 (49.3)	11.8 (53.2)	15.8 (60.4)	20.3 (68.5)	23.1 (73.6)	22.8 (73.0)	18.9 (66.0)	14.0 (57.2)	8.5 (47.3)	5.5 (41.9)	13.5 (56.2)
Mean daily minimum °C (°F)	1.2 (34.2)	1.1 (34.0)	3.4 (38.1)	5.7 (42.3)	9.0 (48.2)	12.8 (55.0)	15.1 (59.2)	15.0 (59.0)	11.8 (53.2)	8.4 (47.1)	4.2 (39.6)	1.8 (35.2)	7.5 (45.4)
Record low °C (°F)	−13.4 (7.9)	−9.8 (14.4)	−8.4 (16.9)	−4.0 (24.8)	−2.1 (28.2)	2.4 (36.3)	5.1 (41.2)	5.3 (41.5)	1.2 (34.2)	−4.2 (24.4)	−8.4 (16.9)	−10.6 (12.9)	−13.4 (7.9)
Average precipitation mm (inches)	37 (1.5)	25 (1.0)	32 (1.3)	41 (1.6)	38 (1.5)	23 (0.9)	12 (0.5)	14 (0.6)	25 (1.0)	55 (2.2)	45 (1.8)	44 (1.7)	391 (15.6)
Average precipitation days (≥ 1 mm)	6.4	5.0	6.4	7.7	6.6	3.7	1.9	2.2	3.9	7.4	7.4	6.5	65.1
Average snowy days	0.7	0.8	0.2	0.1	0	0	0	0	0	0	0.2	0.8	2.8
Average relative humidity (%)	83	72	64	62	56	49	46	48	56	68	78	83	64
Mean monthly sunshine hours	87	147	198	231	282	324	363	326	246	174	105	78	2,561
Source: Agencia Estatal de Meteorología

== Demographics ==
Historical population (current borders)
Year	Pop.	±%
1842	8,974	—
1857	13,275	+47.9%
1877	14,456	+8.9%
1887	14,790	+2.3%
1900	16,646	+12.5%
1910	17,391	+4.5%
1920	18,419	+5.9%
1930	20,778	+12.8%
1940	28,537	+37.3%
1950	35,715	+25.2%
1960	42,327	+18.5%
1970	48,691	+15.0%
1981	58,560	+20.3%
1991	64,476	+10.1%
2001	64,845	+0.6%
2011	65,417	+0.9%
2021	60,397	−7.7%
Source: INE

As of 2025, the population is 59,857, of which 46.2% are males, and 53.8% are females. Minors make up 13.2% of the population, and seniors make up 28.8%.

=== Immigration ===
As of 2025, immigrants make up 9.4% of the population. The 5 largest foreign countries of birth are Colombia, Venezuela, the Dominican Republic, Cuba, and Morocco.

== Sights ==
Main sights of Zamora include:

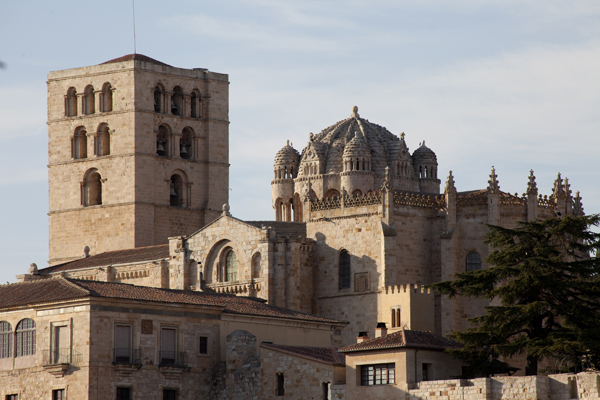
Dome and tower of the Zamora Cathedral

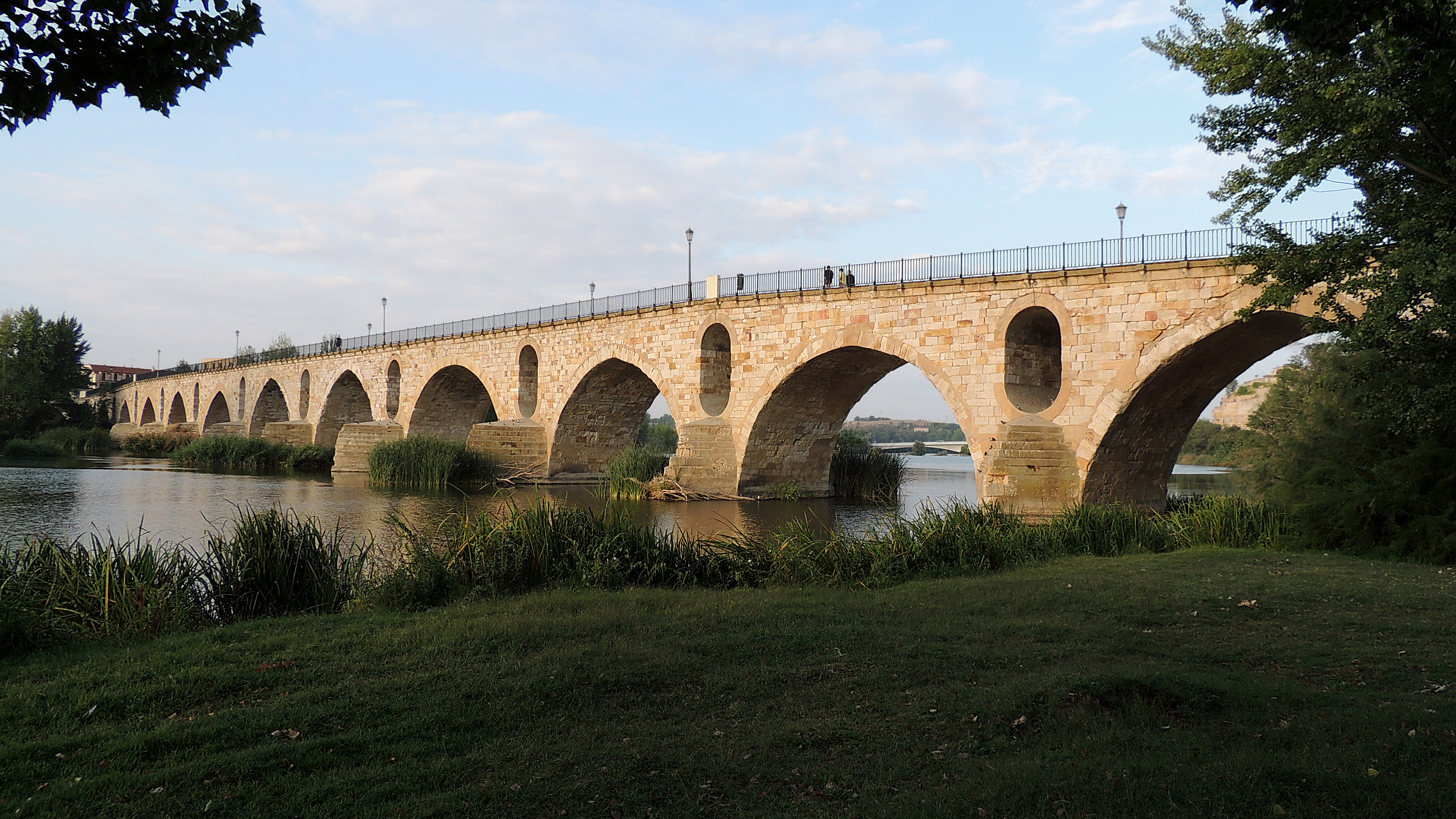
Medieval stone bridge over river Duero.

- Cathedral, in Romanesque style, dating to the 12th century, taking only 23 years to build.
- Medieval Castle of Zamora.
- Palacio de los Condes de Alba y Aliste, built in 1459 by the first Count of Alva y Aliste. It boasts a patio and staircase decorated with carvings by artists from Lombardy.
- Calle Balborraz.
- Church of San Pedro y San Ildefonso, built from the 11th century, probably over a Visigothic temple. It was reformed in Romanesque style in the 12th–13th centuries, but was much renovated in the 15th and 18th centuries. It has presently a single nave with cross vaults
- Church of Santa María Magdalena. The southern façade is in Romanesque style, dating back to the 13th century.
- Church of San Isidoro (12th century). It has one nave, having a square major chapel. The exterior features two ogival arcades with archivolts.
- Church of San Claudio de Olivares, known from the 12th century. Of small size, it has a single nave with a presbytery and a semicircular apse. The columns of the nave have carvings.
- Church of San Juan de Puerta Nueva (12th century stained glass circular window, symbol of Zamora).
- Church of Santa María la Nueva (12th century, baptistery dating back to the 13th century).
- Church of Santiago de los Caballeros (11th century), located outside the city walls. El Cid was created knight here.
- Church of Santiago El Burgo (Southern façade, 12th century Romanesque)
- City walls: three walled enclosures dating back to the 11th, 12th and 13th centuries.
- Museo de Semana Santa de Zamora: Opposite the Church of Santa María la Nueva, dedicated to Semana Santa de Zamora the processions during which are celebrated with particular ceremony in Zamora. The museum holds a large collection of pasos, the figures which are carried in procession through the streets by various 'cofradías' or brotherhoods. See Holy Week in Zamora
- Museo de Zamora: Local history museum with an archeological collection and chronological displays ranging from prehistoric inhabitants of the region to Roman and modern models.

=== Surroundings ===
- Arcenillas church (15th century panels)
- Hiniesta church (Gothic, sculptures and murals)
- The Church of San Pedro de la Nave, (village of El Campillo – 12 km, 7½ miles distant) was founded in the 7th century, rebuilt in the 12th century, and is one of the three best-preserved Visigothic churches in all of Spain. It was moved stone by stone and then re-erected, owing to the construction of a reservoir on its original site.

== Cuisine ==
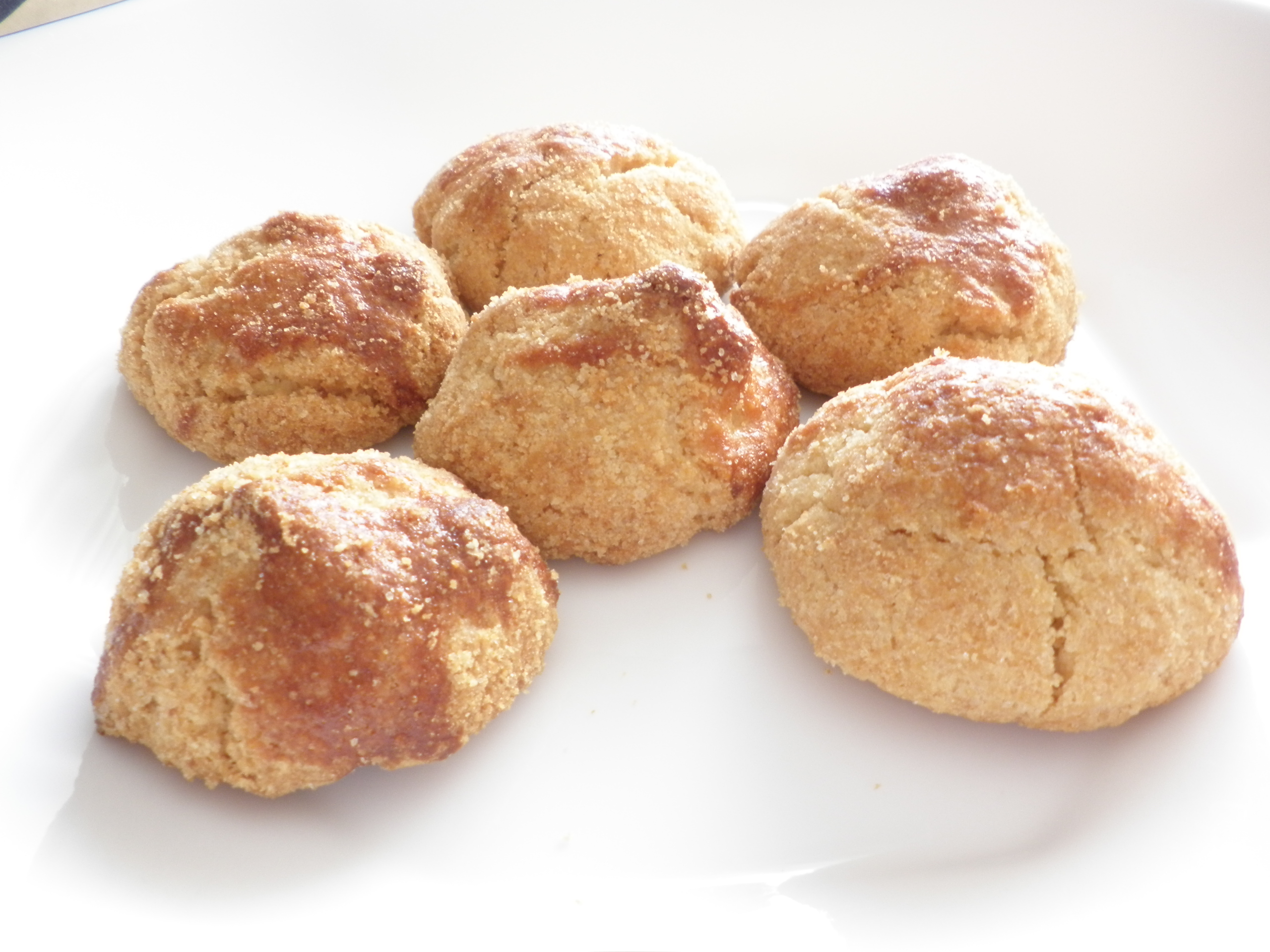
Aceitadas are typically consumed during Easter.

Food specialties in Zamora include the pulses, the chickpeas or 'garbanzos' from Fuentesauco, cheese made from sheep's milk, honey from Sanabria, asparagus from Guareña, peppers from Benavente, steak from Aliste, mushrooms, game, cold meats, cakes and sweets.

Other specialties are the rice dishes from Zamora and the Toro wines (very dark, almost black, nowadays made using modern techniques – with a rapidly growing reputation for their taste and quality). Traditional dishes include bacalao a la tranca (a cod dish), figones (a friterad ball with chorizo, cheese and ham inside), pulpo a la sanabresa (an octopus dish), dos y pingada (two fried eggs with fried ham, usually served at Easter) and presas de ternera (a beef dish). For dessert there is the rebojo Zamorano, a very tasty though hard type of bun, and las natillas almendradas (Spanish style custard with almonds).

== Transport ==
The city is served by the Zamora Railway Station, located on one of the Spanish North-Northwestern high speed lines. All major Spanish bus companies and some local companies operate out of the Estación de Autobuses de Zamora, which connects Zamora to neighboring cities, such as Salamanca and Benavente, as well as nearby pueblos, major cities such as Valladolid and Madrid, and further destinations around Spain and Europe.

== Notable people ==
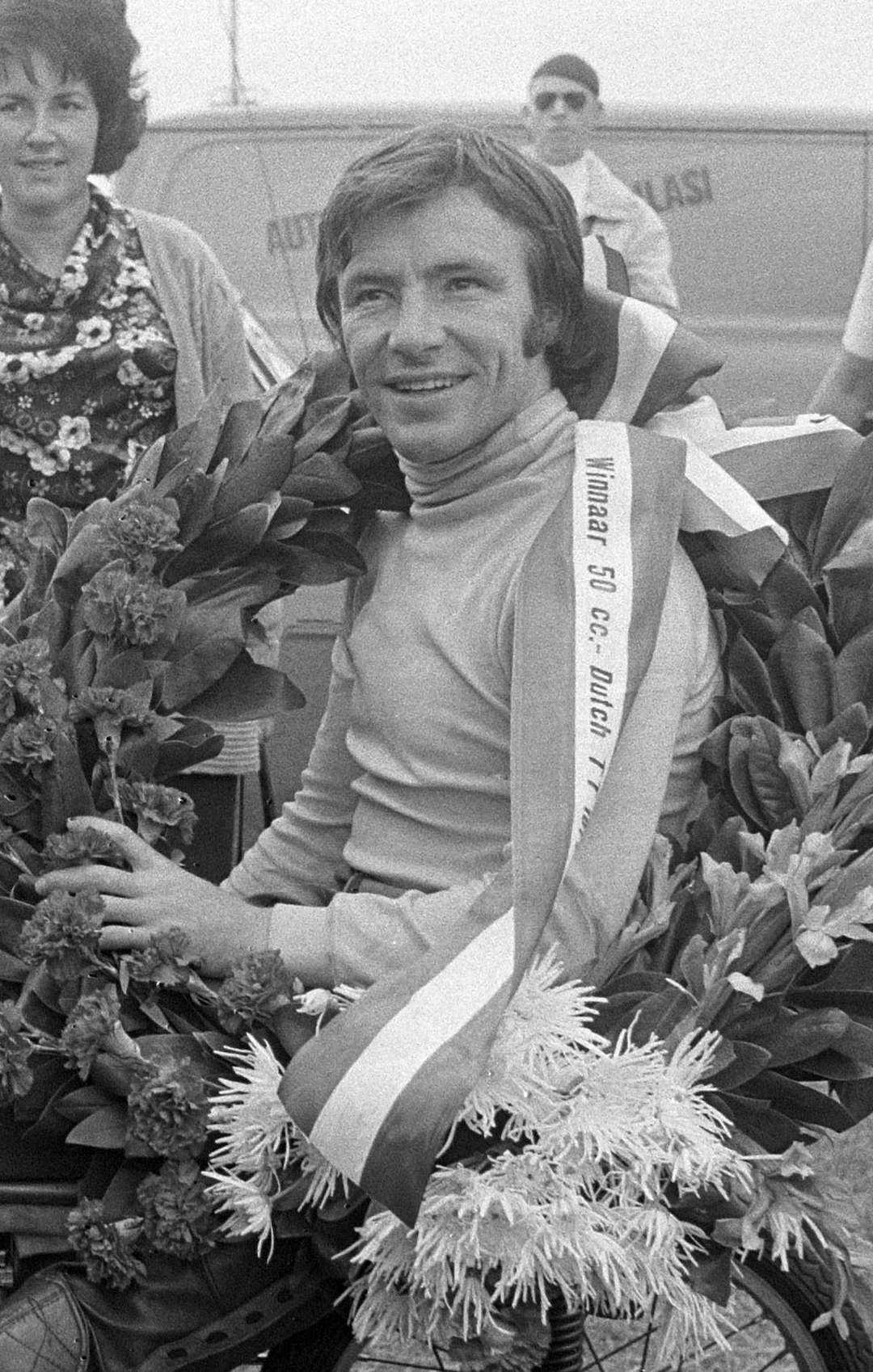
Ángel Nieto in 1972

Predilect sons and daughters (honorary citizens)

- Ángel Nieto (1947–2017 – motorcycle racer, posthumous recognition

People born in Zamora

- Leopoldo Alas — also known as "Clarín"; Spanish novelist
- Jacob ibn Habib (1460-1516) — Jewish commentator on the Talmud
- Carlos Llamas — national radio news presenter, died 10 October 2007
- Emilio Merchán – multi-time world champion in canoeing
- Ramón Álvarez Moretón – sculptor of many of the figures or 'pasos' carried through its streets during the Holy Week
- Manuel Pérez (1735 - 1819) — lieutenant governor of Louisiana between 1787 and 1792
- Sergio Reguilón — footballer, left back; Real Madrid, Tottenham Hotspur, Spain National team
- Agustín Remesal — journalist, TV correspondent

== International relations ==
=== Twin towns – sister cities ===
- Bragança, Portugal (1984).
- Oviedo, Spain, since 2001.
- Yaritagua, Venezuela.
- Altagracia de Orituco, Venezuela
