= Antonio Castillo =

Antonio Castillo or Tony Castillo may refer to:

== Creative arts personalities ==
- Antonio del Castillo y Saavedra (1616–1668), Spanish Baroque painter, sculptor, and poet
- Antonio Castillo Lastrucci (1882–1967), Spanish Andalusian religious sculptor
- Antonio Martínez del Castillo (1894–1962), Spanish film director
- Antonio Castillo (costume designer) (1908–1984), Spanish wardrobe supervisor
- Tony "Gorilla Tek" Castillo (born 1976), American record producer and composer

== Political figures ==
- Antonio Cánovas del Castillo (1828–1897), Spanish Prime Minister
- Antonio Nava Castillo (1905–1983), Mexican polo player and politician

== Sportspeople ==
- Tony Castillo (catcher) (born June 1957), American baseball catcher
- Tony Castillo (pitcher) (born 1963), Venezuela-born American relief pitcher
- Antonio Salazar (footballer) (born 1989), Mexican footballer
- Antonio Castillo (breakdancer), American breakdancer

== Fictional characters ==
- Antonio Castillo, protagonist in film Dos Corazones y un Cielo

== See also ==
- Castillo (surname)
