= Holy Week in Málaga =

Christian observance in Malaga, Spain

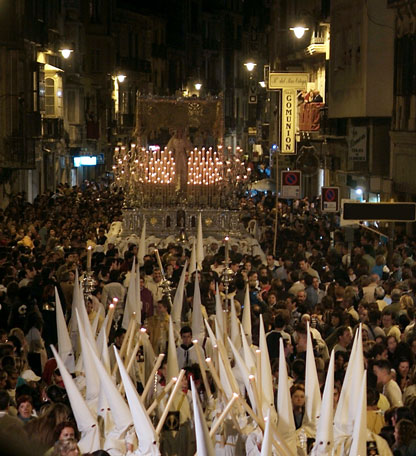
- A procession in Holy Week
- Official name: Semana Santa en Málaga
- Observed by: Málaga, Spain
- Type: Religious, Historical, Cultural
- Significance: Commemoration of the passion, death and resurrection of Jesus
- Celebrations: Processions
- Begins: Palm Sunday
- Ends: Easter Sunday
- 2025 date: April 13 - April 20
- 2026 date: March 29 - April 5
- 2027 date: March 21 - March 28
- 2028 date: April 9 - April 16
- Frequency: Annual

Holy Week in Málaga (Spanish: Semana Santa en Málaga) is the annual commemoration of the Passion of Jesus in Málaga, Spain. It takes place during the last week of Lent, the week immediately before Easter. It is one of the city's main cultural and religious events.

During Holy Week, 42 brotherhoods (cofradía) make 45 processions through the streets of Málaga showing realistic wooden sculptures that depict scenes from the Passion, or images of the Virgin Mary showing sorrow.

Holy Week in Málaga was declared in 1965 to be a Fiesta of International Tourist Interest of Spain.

== Procession ==
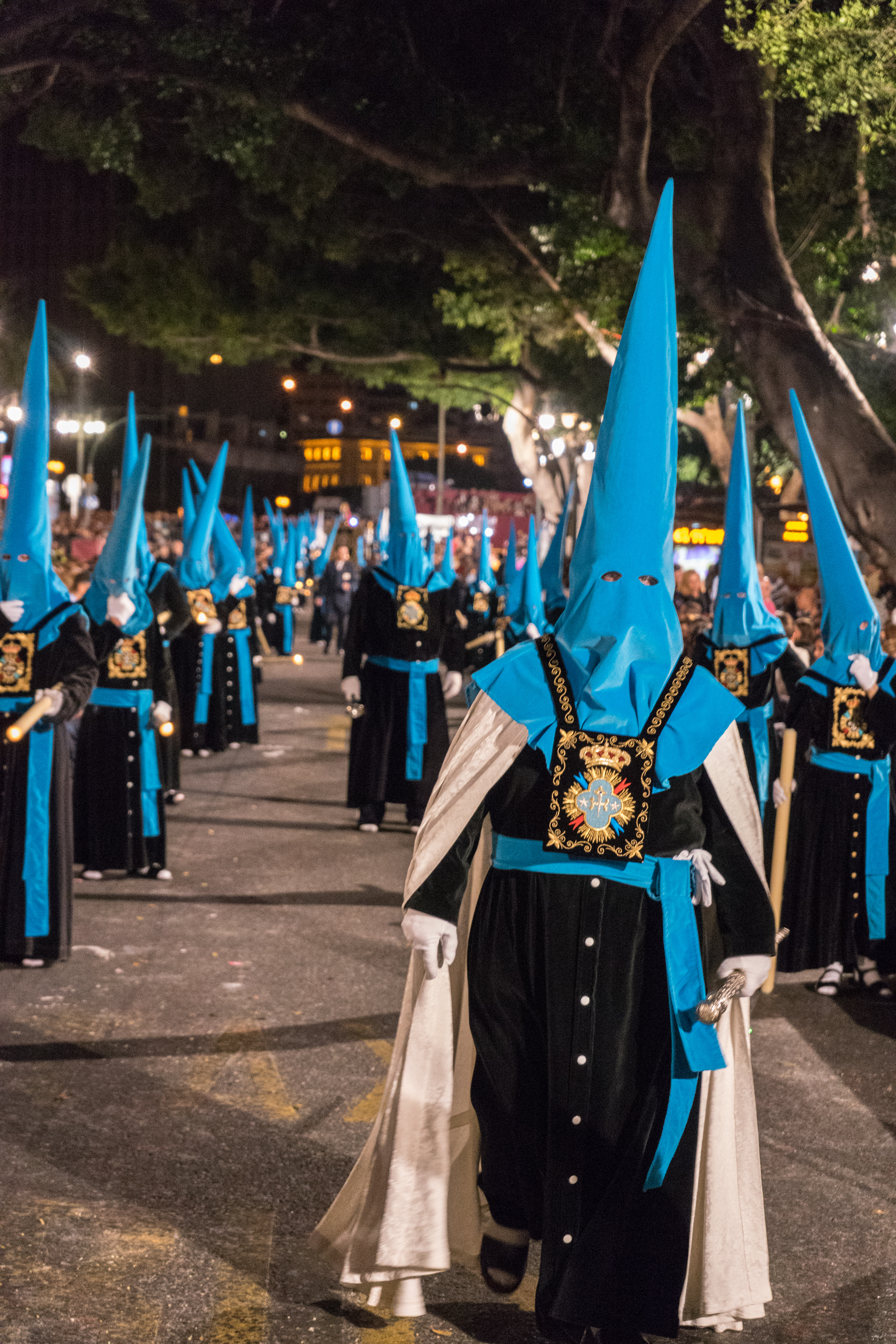
Nazarenes of the section of the Virgin of the Brotherhood of the Holy Transfer

=== Nazareno ===
In common with other Holy Week events in Spain, some participants in the procession use a nazareno or penitential robe. This garment consists of a tunic, a capirote (hood with conical tip) used to conceal the face of the wearer, and sometimes a cloak. The fabrics normally used in these garments are velvet, damask, satin or twill. The nazarenos of some brotherhoods also include gloves, scapulars, stoles and a tunic fastened with a cincture made of esparto. The exact colors and forms of the robes depend on the particular brotherhood; in the Málaga procession, their colors are different in the sections of Christ and the Virgin. Usually, the nazarenos carry candles and go in front of the thrones at the leading segments.

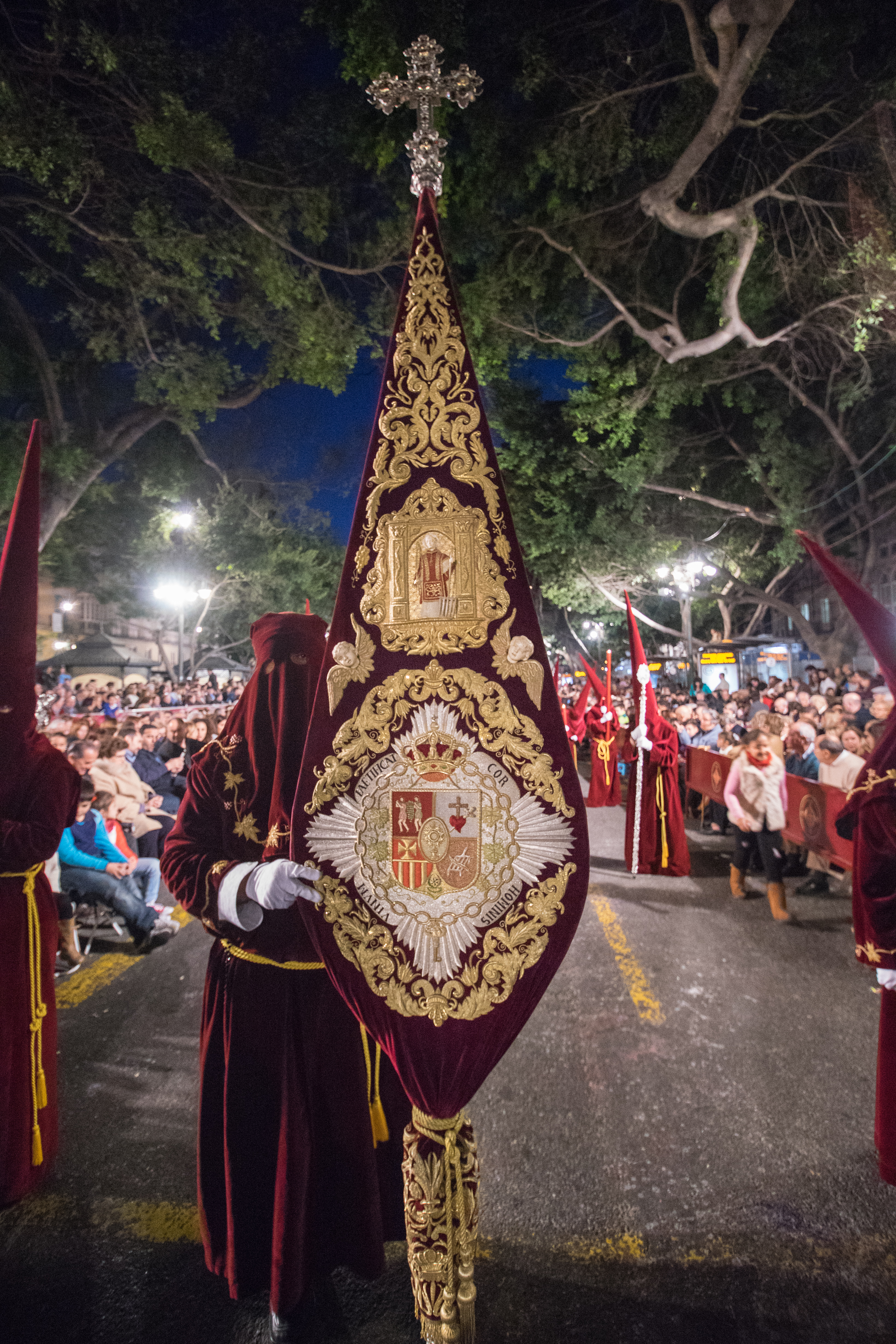
A banner embroidered with the shield of the brotherhood from the Vineyard Owners

=== Emblem ===
The majority of the brotherhoods carry a significant number of insignia in the procession that are carried by nazarenos:

- Cross guide (the so-called Cruz de Guía - Guiding Cross) is carried at the beginning of each procession and is responsible for guiding it.
- Banner (the so-called Guión) is an emblem of the cofradía in the form of a folded flag, that carries in the center of the flag embroidered in thread of gold and silk the shield or arms of the brotherhood.
- Senatus is the name with which it is known to an emblem that serves to recall the time of the Roman Empire, the period wherein the events of the Passion of Jesus Christ are set. It bears the letters SPQR, which is an acronym for the Latin expression Senatus Populusque Romanus (Senate and people of Rome).
- Book of Rules (in Spanish Libro de Reglas) is a book that contains the norms and rules of the Brotherhood.

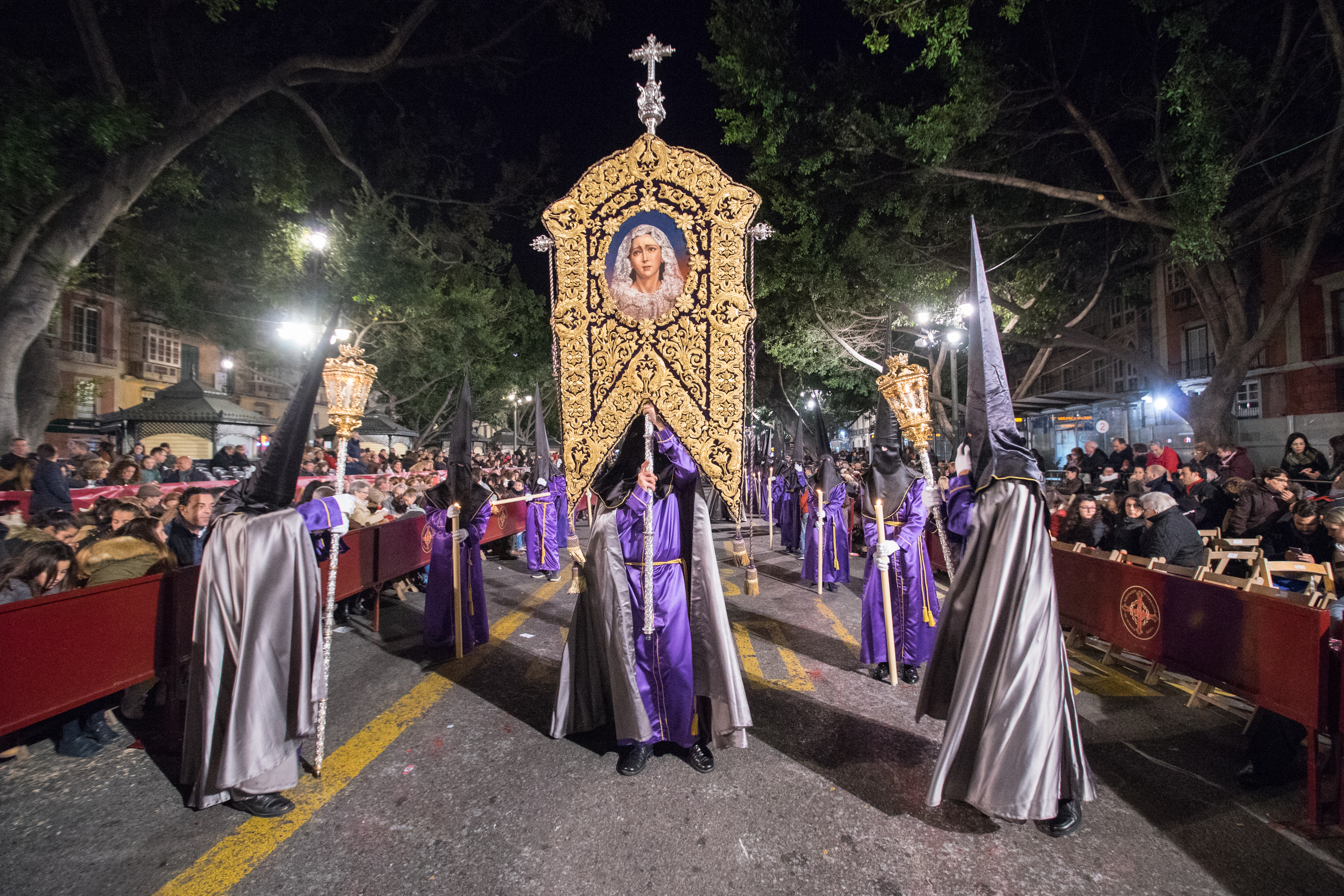
A standard embroidered with a painting of Mary Most Holy of Grace

- Standard (the so-called Estandarte) is an insignia, sometimes embroidered in gold thread and luxuriously decorated, with a painting of the Christ or Virgin of each brotherhood.

=== Mantilla ===
Some processions are accompanied by women who wear mantillas. It is formed by a black dress, a sign of mourning and pains, is accompanied by a mantilla, lace or silk veil or shawl worn over the head and back. The peineta, similar in appearance to a large comb, is used to hold up the mantilla.

=== Acolyte ===
Before the throne are placed a group of six or eight acolytes dressed in vestments, many of them wearing dalmatics; the ceroferarios who carries the ciriales or processional candlestick; and the thurifers who carries the thurible where incense is burned and it is dispersed.

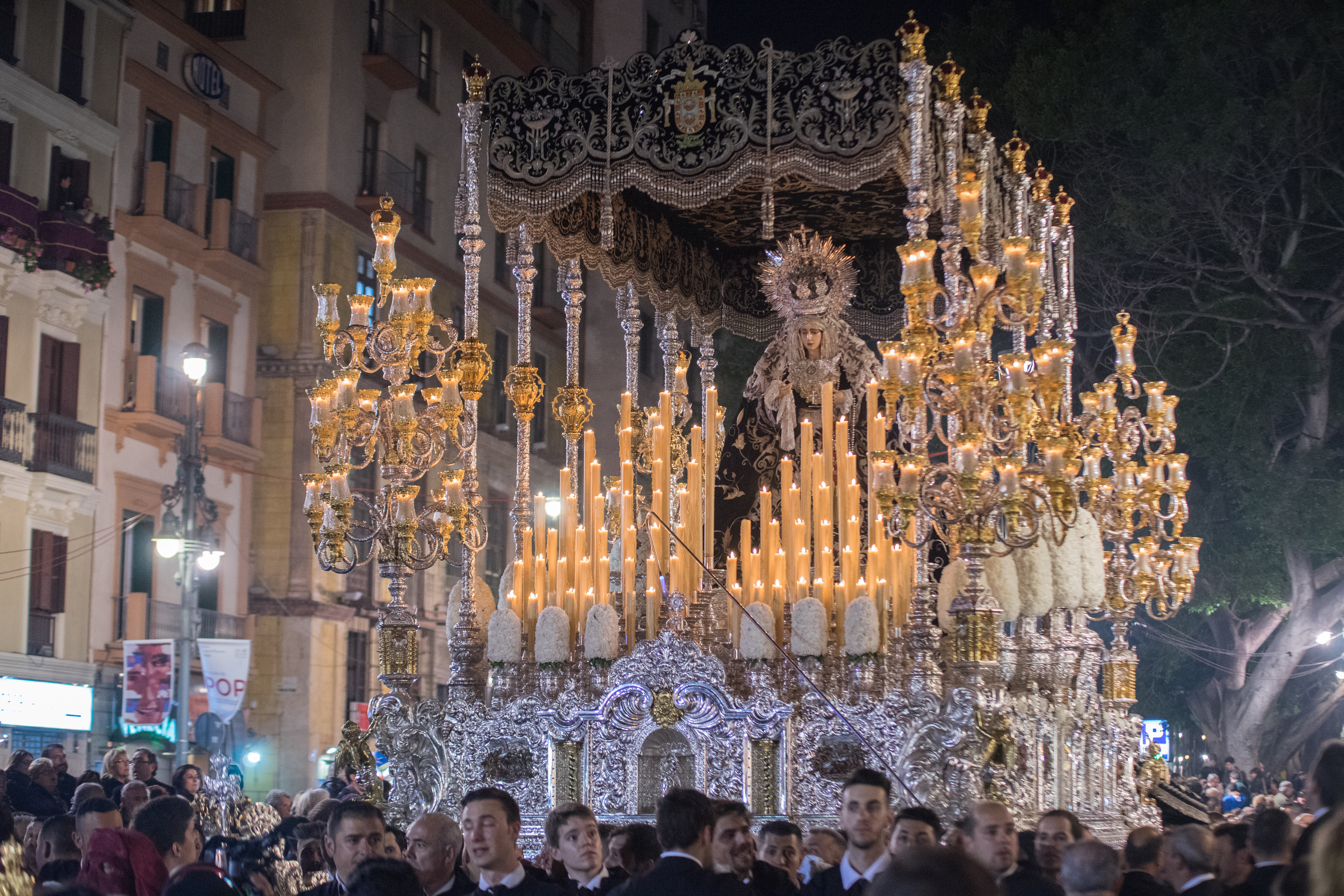
Throne of Our Lady of Great Power, where the canopy is visible with the bambalinas, the candelería at the front and the arbotantes on the corners.

=== Throne ===
The thrones, in others places called pasos, are enormous platforms where are located the sculptures that depict different scenes from the gospels related to the Passion of Christ or the Sorrows of Virgin Mary. Each brotherhood usually exhibit two thrones, the first one would be a sculpted scene of the Passion, or image of Christ; and the second an image of the Virgin Mary, known as a dolorosa.

The structure of the thrones, known as cajillo, is richly carved in wood, silver, bronze or nickel silver and some gilt with gold leaf. In each of the corners of the cajillo is placed the arbotantes (candelabra) or lantern to illuminate the image or sculptural group that is located in the upper part of the cajillo.

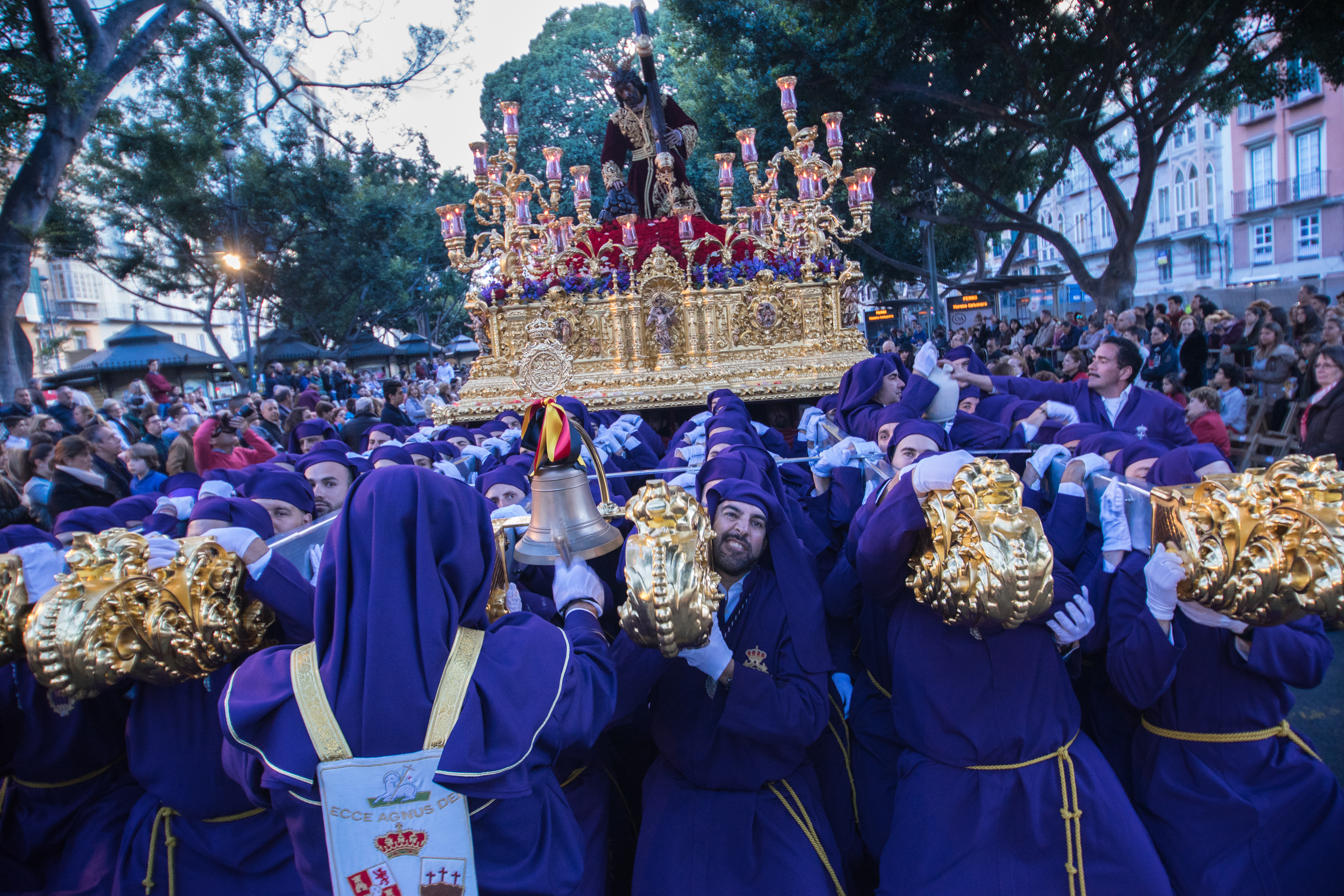
A throne butler rings a bell after the bearers' rest

The thrones of Christ are adorned at the top with carpet of flowers such as carnations or iris, or a mountain of corks, while most of the Virgin's thrones are covered by an ornate canopy secured to the cajillo by 12 or 16 palio bars. From the front, back and sides of the canopy hang the bambalinas, velvet or mesh draperies embroidered in gold, plate and silk. In front of the image of the Virgin is placed the candelería, a set of candlesticks which are placed in a stepped layout.

Thrones are carried on the shoulders of men and women, called men of thrones or bearers, through long bars or beams called varales, which usually measure between 8 and 14 meters long. Each throne has 6 or 8 varales depending on the size of the throne. Depending on weight, some can weigh up to 5 tonnes, a throne requires between 120 and 270 portadores (bearers) to move. Each person can carry between 20 and 40 kilograms of weight, during the time of the procession, from 6 to 14 hours.

At the front of the throne's varales there is a big bell. This is rung with a hammer by the Throne Butler (the chief of the Throne Men) to guide and stop to rest the bearers.

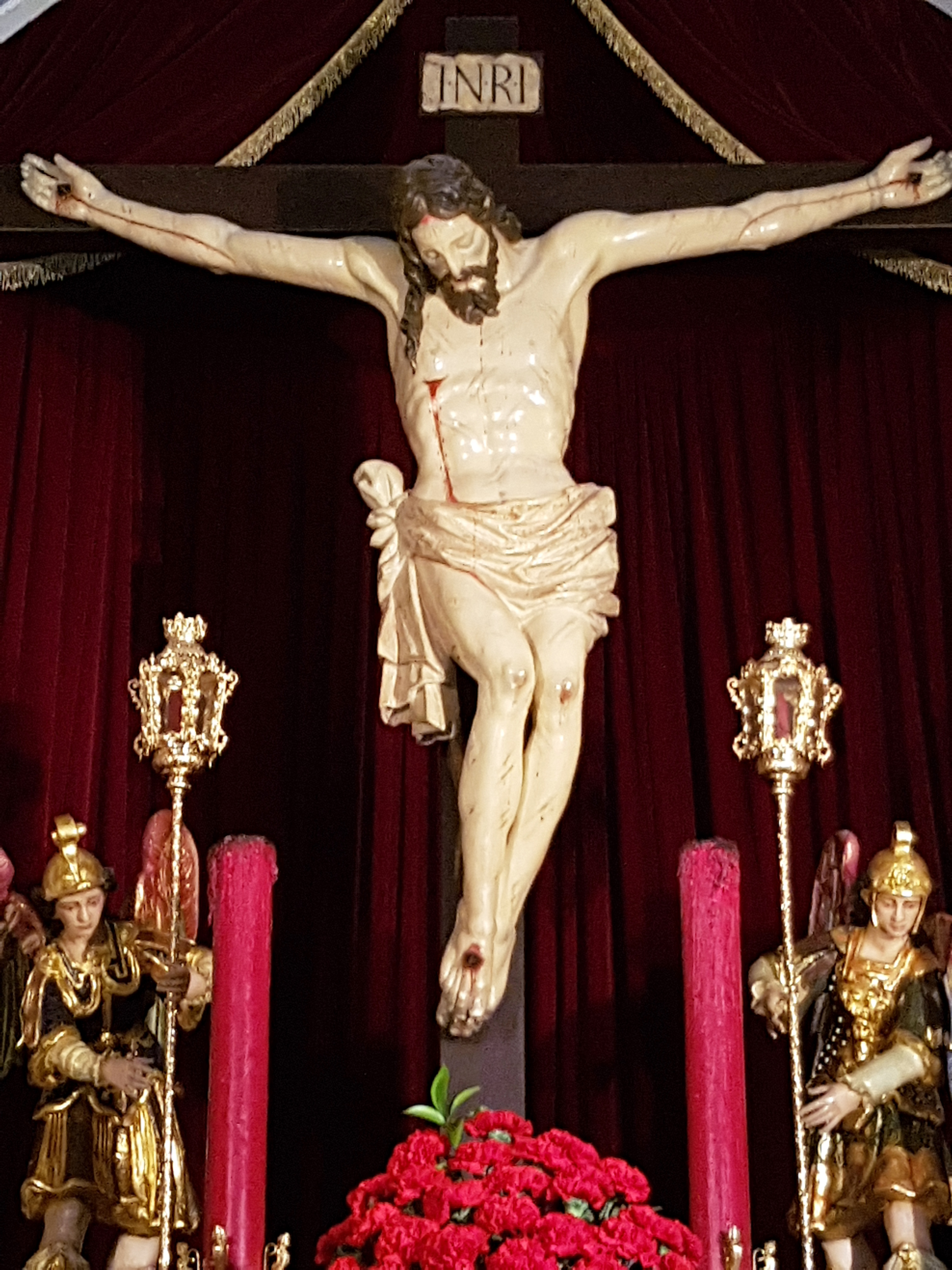
Most Holy Christ of the Souls of the Blind (c. 1649) attributed to Pedro de Zayas, Royal Merged Confraternities

=== Sculpture ===
The sculptures are located at the top of the throne and are the central axis of each brotherhood, most of the sculptures are carved wood (or recently, polychrome), often life-size or somewhat smaller. Some of these carvings are great works of art with centuries of antiquity, although unfortunately during the burning of churches and convents in the 1931 riots, a great number of these sculptures were destroyed, between them the great majority of works of Pedro de Mena y Medrano. After the Civil War, authors such as Mariano Benlliure y Gil, Francisco Palma Burgos, Antonio Castillo Lastrucci or José-Navas Parejo Pérez began to make new sculptures to replace the destroyed works.

These sculptures are in their respective churches and chapels during the rest of the year where they receive veneration.

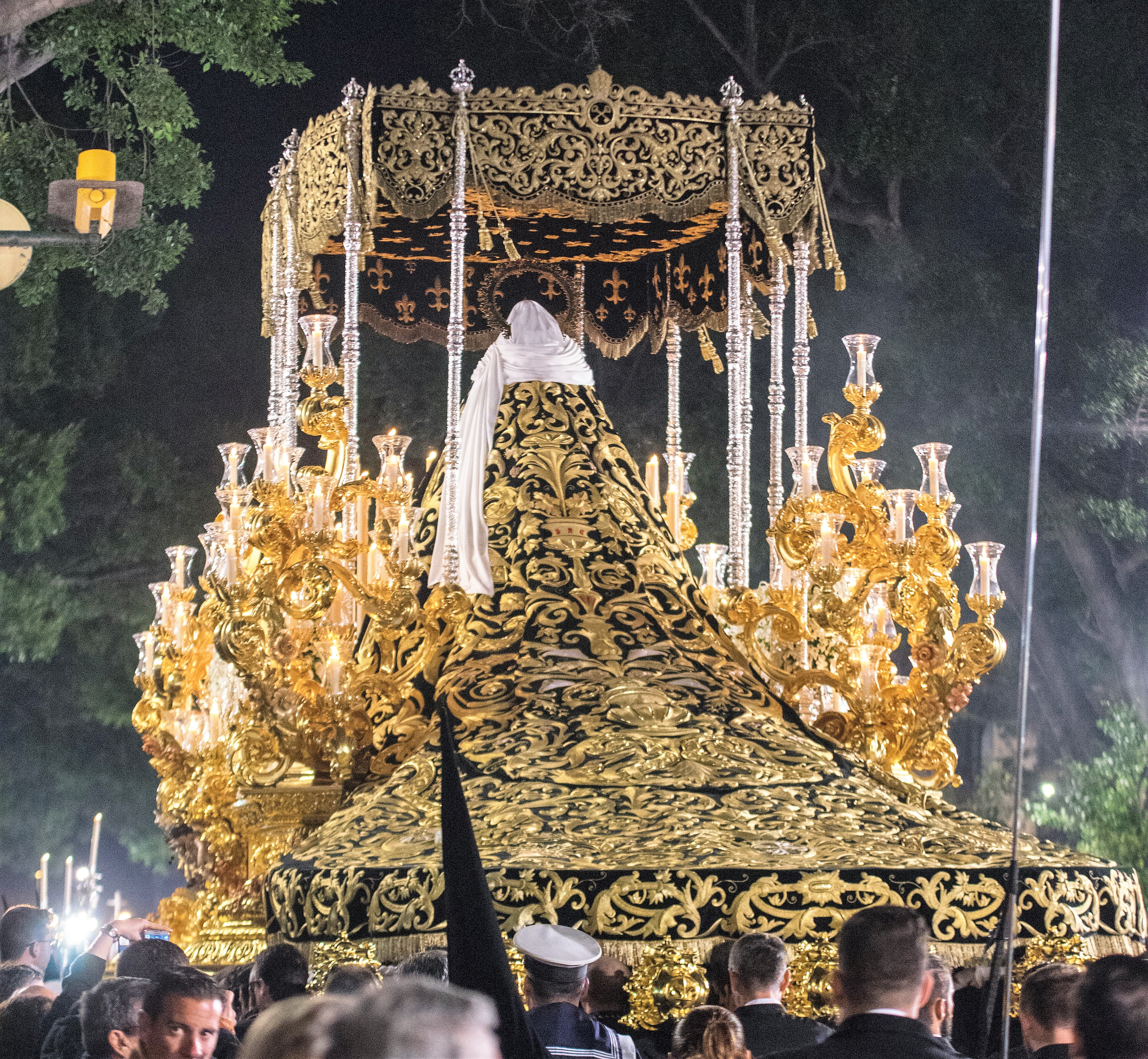
Cape of Our Lady Crowned of Solitude, Congregation of Mena

The images of Jesus are situated on the first throne, which represents a biblical passage of the Gospels: triumphal entry into Jerusalem, Jesus carrying the cross, Jesus crucified, descent from the Cross, etc. Depending on the scene depicted the carving of Jesus may appear alone or accompanied by other statues related to the biblical passage. Some images of Christ wear tunics, smooth or richly embroidered over much of its surface.

In the second throne is located the Virgin of Sorrow, mostly alone but sometimes accompanied by sculpture St. John the Evangelist. The statue of the Virgin usually is of a mannequin, with only the hands and the head carved. The body and arms are covered with luxurious dresses embroidered with gold and silver thread as well as colored silks. Around the head is placed a veil and usually carry a crown or halo. In the back is placed long capes embroidered in gold and silver thread and taking forms that are generally inspired by vegetable motifs, in Malaga these capes can reach up to 8 meters in length.

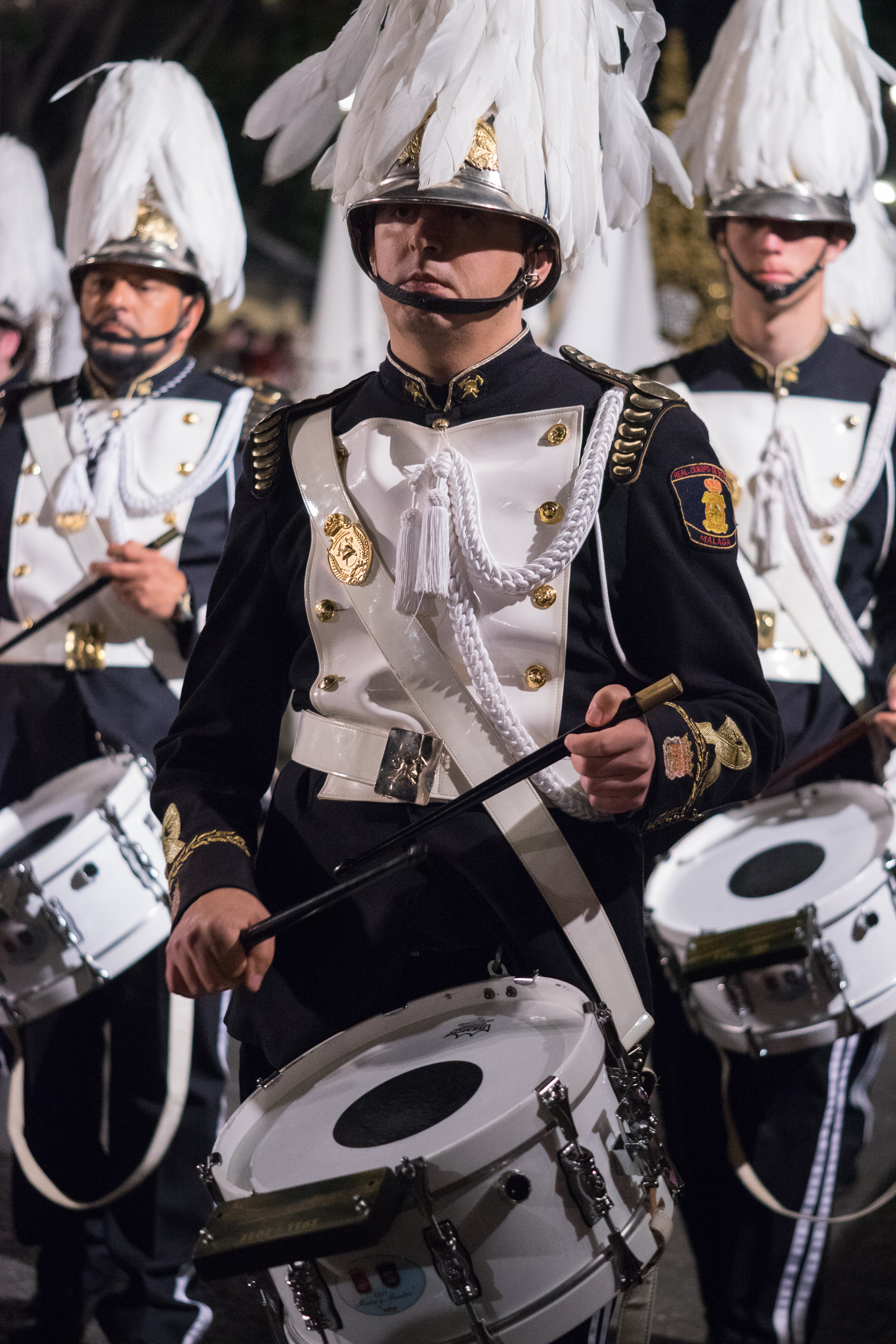
Drums belonging to a band

=== Music ===
Bands

Most of the thrones are accompanied by marching bands. Each procession usually has 3 bands, the first band, a drum and bugle band is located behind the lead cross. The second band walks behind the first float, this band is usually of bugles and drums, military band or concert band with woodwind instrument, brass instrument and percussion. Finally, the throne of the virgin is only accompanied by a concert band. Many of these bands are created by the brotherhoods themselves, a few being made up of personnel of the Armed Forces.

These bands play processional marches during processions, most of these marches have been created to accompany the movement of the thrones. It is a tradition that the Marcha Real is played at the departure and entrance of the images in the home churches or chapels of the confraternities and once it is played, everyone pays respect to the anthem (military, police and fire personnel out of formation salute when it is performed).

Saeta

As throughout the Spanish world, and especially in Andalucía, during the processions saetas are sung to the sculptures. The saeta is a religious song, generally improvised and without accompaniment, which is usually sung from a balcony or on the street. It is a melody of free and full of lyricism. It recalls the style of cante jondo typical of the musical tradition of flamenco.

== The Route ==
=== Brotherhood house ===
This is the place from which the great majority of the corporations begin their processional route, because the dimensions of the thrones do not allow them to begin the procession at their associated churches.

It is also where they keep the heritage throughout the year, occupying many positions in their museum during the rest of the year.

=== Official Route ===
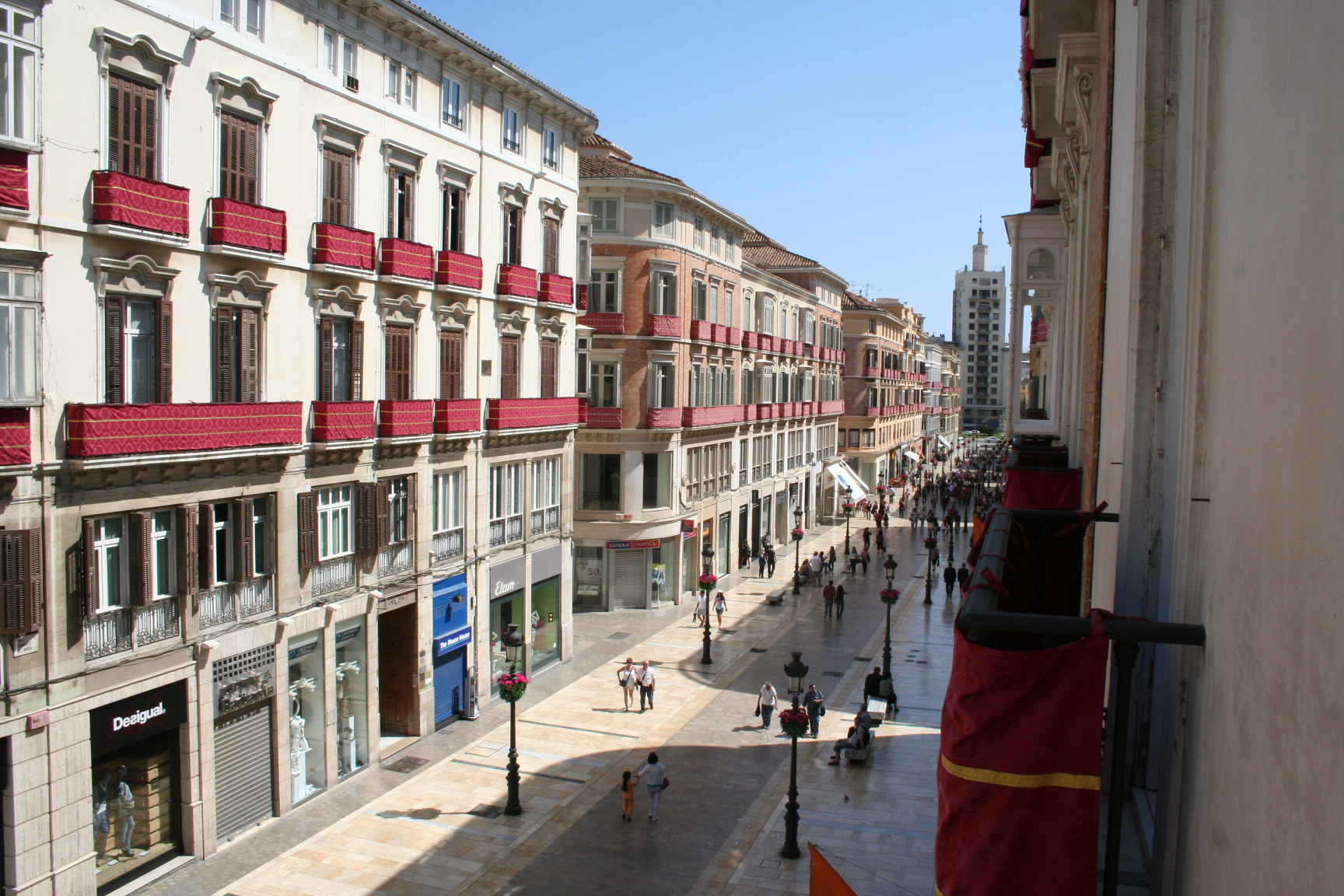
Marqués de Larios Street, one of the streets that form the official route

In Holy Week, the official route is made up of those streets that share each and every one of the brotherhoods.

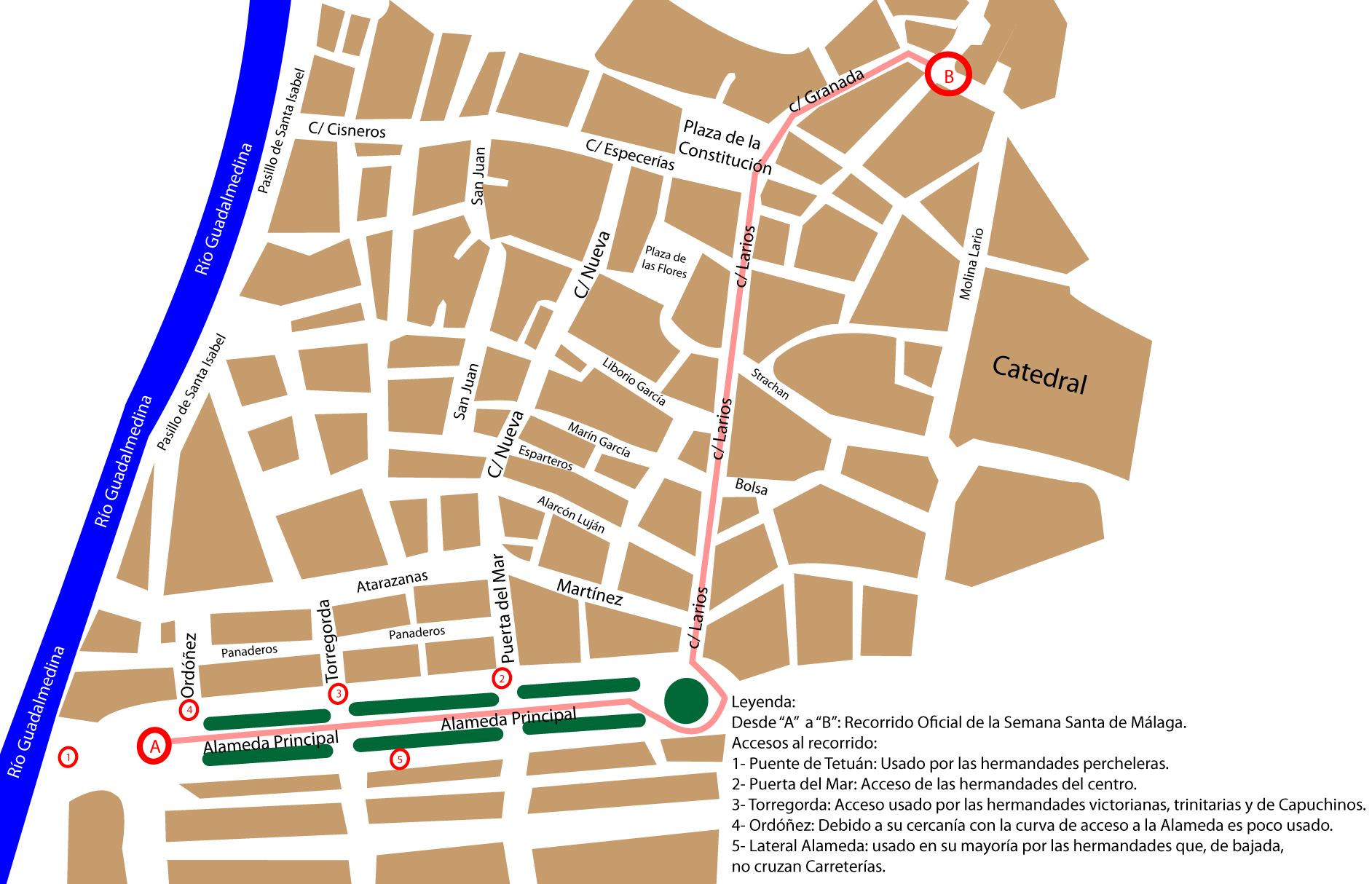
Former official route

During Holy Week, the brotherhoods of Málaga leave their temple or brotherhood' house, to go to the official route. This route formerly began in the Alameda Principal and followed the Larios roundabout, Marqués de Larios street, Constitution Square and Granada street. This route had a distance of about 850 meters. After this route, the brotherhoods continued their own journey returning to their brotherhood or temples of origin, or enter the Cathedral to establish their penitence station. As of 2026, the route takes a different path, passing Constitution Square before proceeding down Calle Larios, Calle Martinez, Calle Atarazanas, passing the Alameda Principal, Calle Torregarda, Calle Molina Lario, and officially ending at the Malaga Cathedral. The brotherhoods each then continue on to their respective temples or houses.

The Association of Holy Brotherhoods of Malaga places on the official route around 16,000 chairs and several grandstands, among which the Constitution Square Grandstand stands out among the rest, as it is where the city mayor and members of the city council are assembled to witness the procession of the images.

=== The Rostrum of the Poor ===
At the end of Carretería Street from Málaga, at the confluence with the Santa Isabel Hall, there is a staircase which during Holy Week is used to watch the processions of Malaga. Some brotherhoods are expected there. It is called this because it is free and in contrast to the Official Rostrum, located in Constitution Square where the authorities are seated.

In 2017, of the 45 processions participating in Holy Week, 28 passed through this place.

=== Cathedral ===
Some brotherhoods make a penitential station inside the Cathedral of Malaga. There are 15 cofradías that enter the Cathedral. The remaining corporations do not station in the Cathedral due essentially to the large size of their thrones, which prevents them from entering the Cathedral thru the main gates.

== Previous Days ==
=== Procession ===
Prior to Holy Week, especially the Friday of Sorrows and the Saturday of Passion, some brotherhoods make processions. These brotherhoods are usually historical confraternities of neighborhoods very far from the center, as the Brotherhood of the Sorrows from Puerto de la Torre or Brotherhood of the Sorrows from Churriana, or young brotherhoods that still do not belong to the Group of Confraternities, so even they can not go through the official route.

Transfer of the Most Holy Christ of the Good Death by Legion, Holy Thursday morning

=== Transfers ===
The transfers are small processions in which usually only one throne of reduced dimensions which carry the two sculptures of the brotherhood. They aim to move the statues of their temple to the Brotherhood' House. They usually take place the week before Holy Week, although some brotherhoods carry out during Holy Week.

Some of these transfers are well known, such as that of Jesus Captive who visits patients of the Civil Hospital or the Christ of the Good Death on the morning of Holy Thursday carried out by the Legion, they arrive by boat to the port of Málaga, from there they move to the Church of Santo Domingo to transfer the Christ of the Good Death to his throne, which is in the brotherhood' house next to the church.

== The Days of Holy Week ==
During the days of Holy Week, 41 brotherhoods, belonging to the Brotherhoods Association, carry out 45 penitential processions through the streets of Malaga, the following list shows these "cofradías" by day and order of passage by the official route.

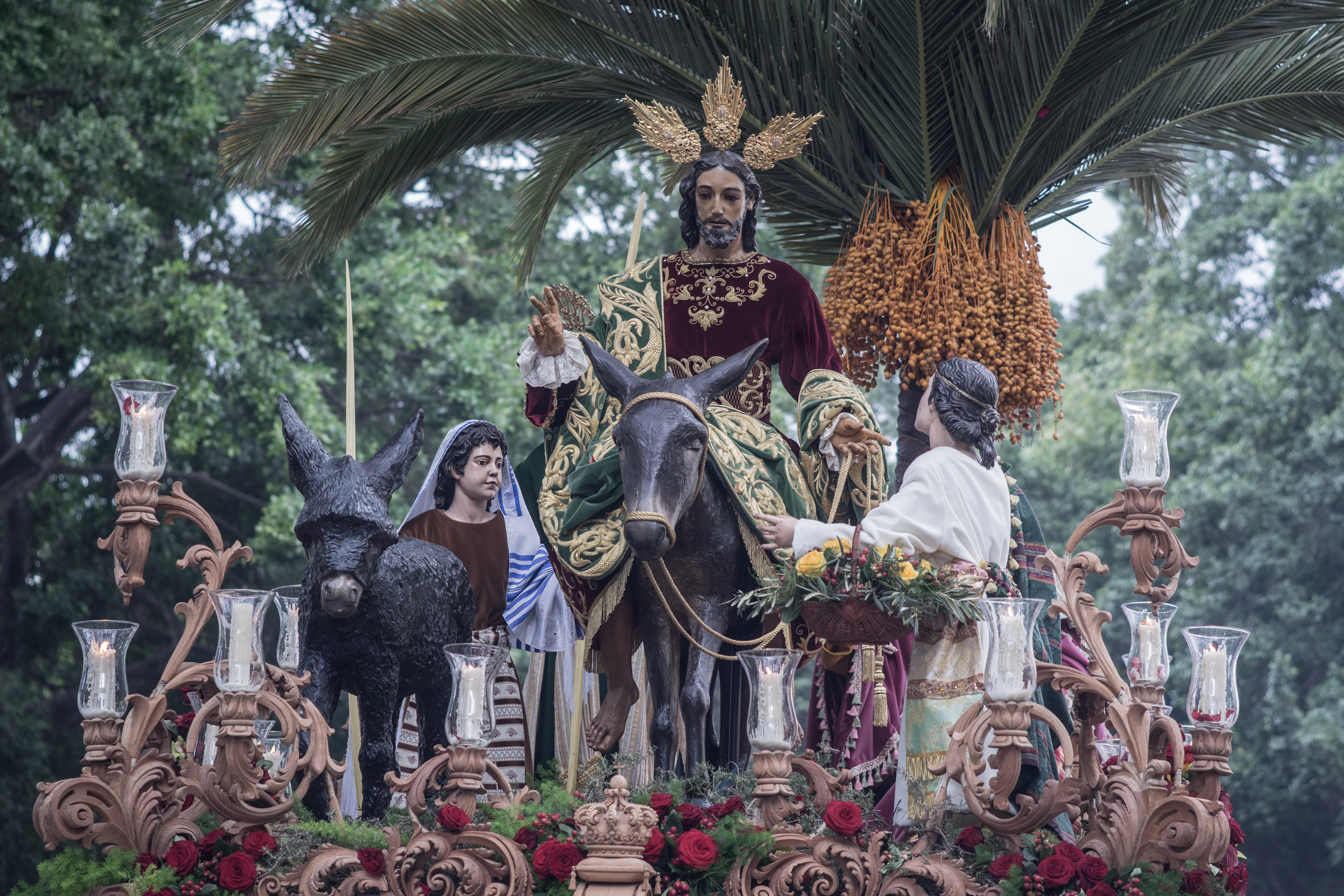
Jesus' triumphal entry into Jerusalem, Pollinica

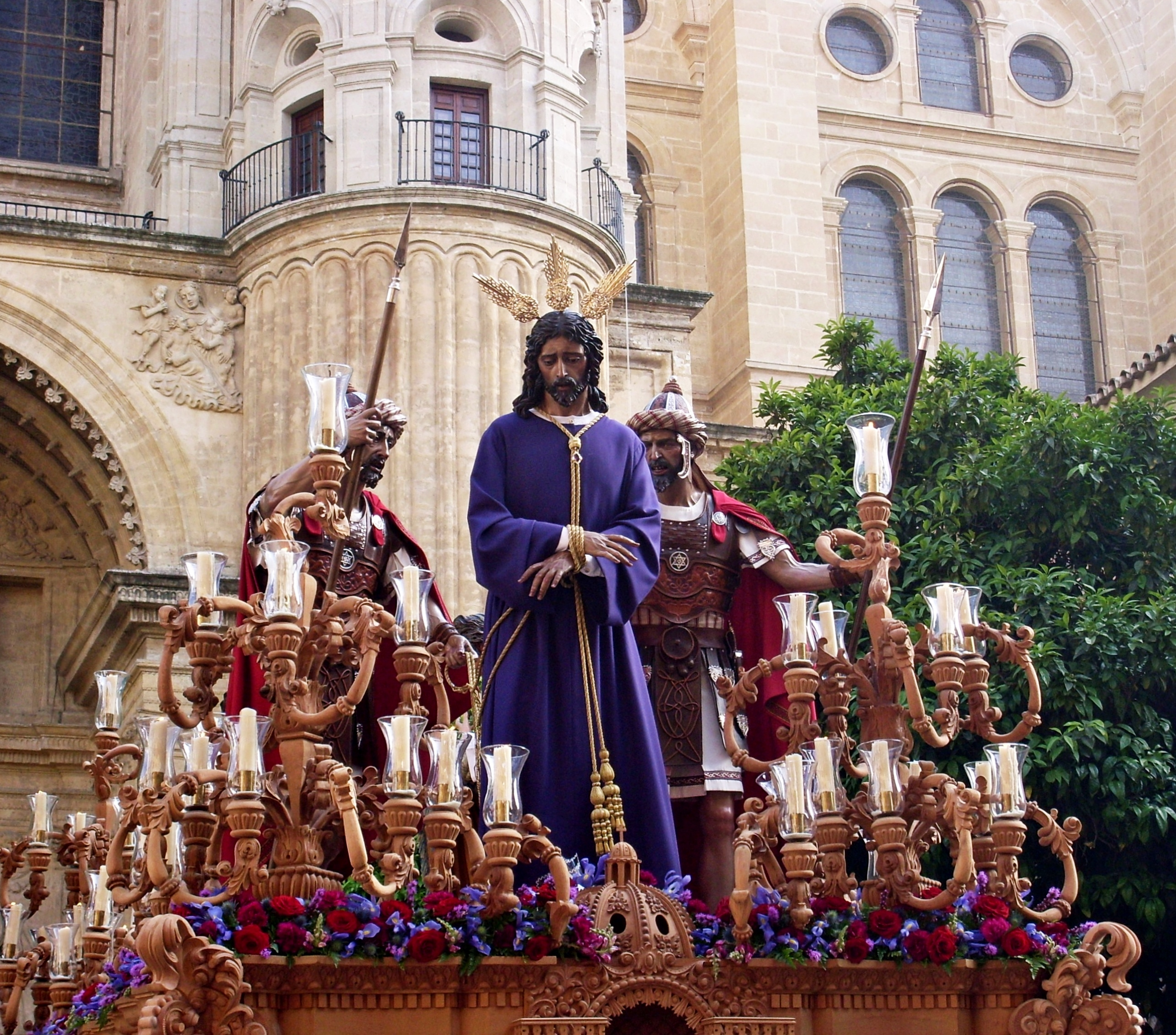
Our Father Jesus of Solitude leaving the Cathedral

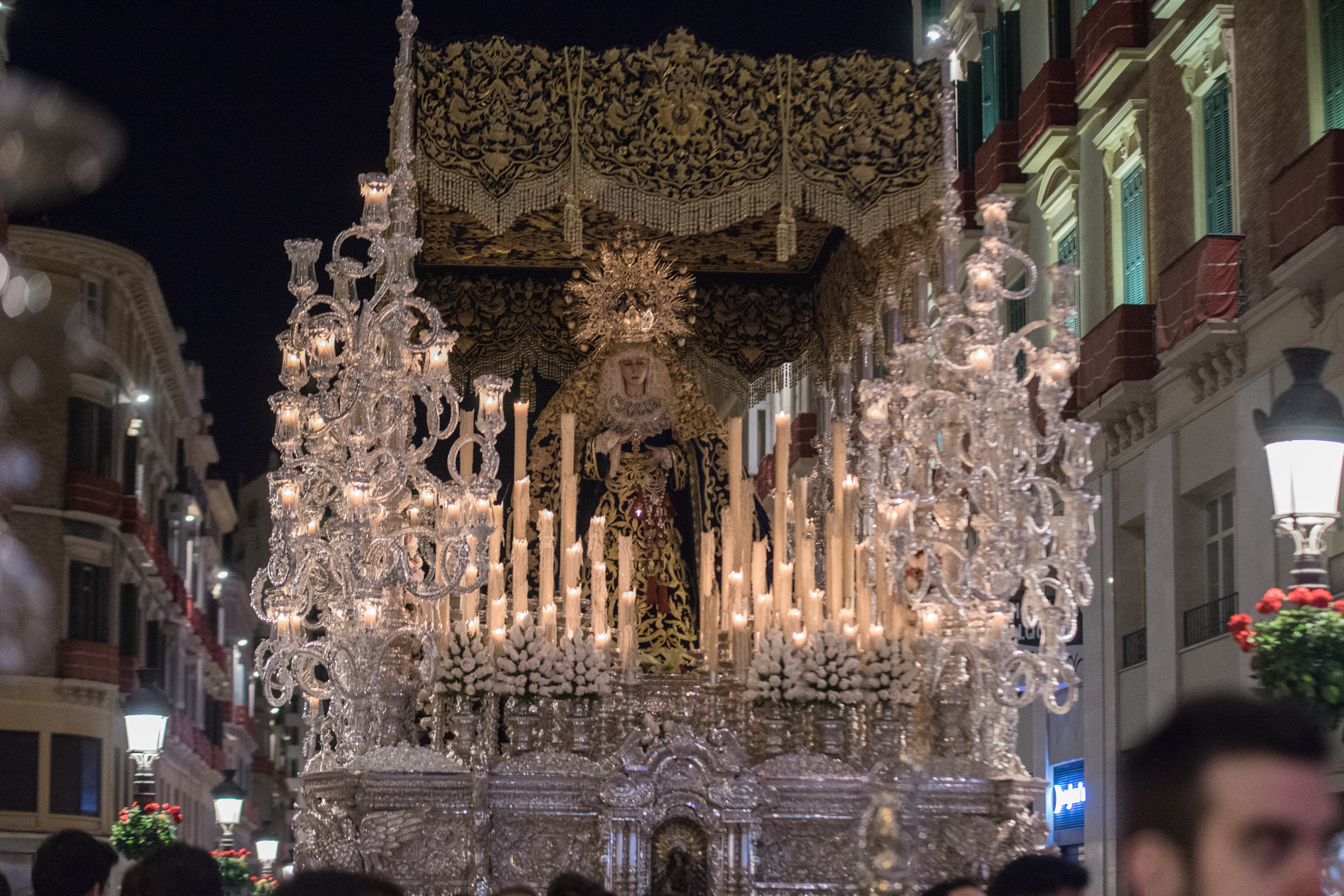
Mary Most Holy of Great Forgiveness, Prendimiento

=== Palm Sunday ===
The first day of Holy Week is also the day where more brotherhoods go in procession, as nine brotherhoods take the streets from different neighborhoods of the city.

- Confraternity of Pollinica (Cofradía de la Pollinica). Beginning at 10 o'clock in the morning with the departure of Our Father Jesus at His Entrance in Jerusalem and Mary Most Holy of Protection, traditionally known as the "Pollinica". It was founded in 1911 and represents the moment of Jesus at his triumphal entry into Jerusalem. It is the brotherhood that has increased participation of children, their presence a signal that Holy Week has begun.
- Mary Most Holy of Tears and Favors. (María Santísima de Lágrimas y Favores). An hour later from the Church of Saint John, the Virgin of Tears and Favors, belonging to the Royal Merged Confraternities, will take to the street, in this procession, actor Antonio Banderas participates as a Throne Butler. His presence in recent years makes this procession one of the more covered by the press.
- Brotherhood of Humility and Patience . (Hermandad de Humildad y Paciencia). From the neighborhood of Cruz de Humilladero processions for 10 hours the brotherhood of the Most Holy Christ of Humility and Patience, represents the moment before the crucifixion in which Jesus retires to pray while preparing the cross, and Mary Most Holy of Sorrows and Hope.
- Brotherhood of Humility (Hermandad de la Humildad). The brotherhood performs its processional from the Sanctuary of Holy Mary of Victory and of Mercy. It represents the moment in which Pontius Pilate utters the words Ecce homo when he presents a scourged Jesus Christ, bound and crowned with thorns to a hostile crowd shortly.
- Archconfraternity of the Prayer in the Garden (Archicofradía de la Oración en el Huerto). It was founded in 1920, the result of a merger between two brotherhoods. The statues are Our Father Jesus Praying in the Garden, which shows Jesus praying in the Garden of Gethsemane, and Our Lady of the Conception.
- Brotherhood of Health (Hermandad de la Salud). It leaves the Church of Saint Paul, in the neighbourhood known as La Trinidad. The statues shows the Most Holy Christ of Hope in his Great Love just after his crucifixion and another one of Mary Most Holy of Health.
- Brotherhood of the Sweet Name (Hermandad del Dulce Nombre). Coming from the neighborhood of Capuchinos, The sculptural group of Our Father Jesus of Solitude symbolizes the denials of Saint Peter while the cock crows. Behind it is the throne of Mary Most Holy of the Sweet Name.
- Brotherhood of the Salutation (Hermandad de Salutación). This brotherhood starts from Saint Philip Neri Church, Jesus Nazarene of the Salutation represents the moment in which Jesus, in his way to Calvary, meets with the women and Saint Veronica and she gave him her veil that he might wipe his forehead.
- Brotherhood of the Arrest (Hermandad del Prendimiento). The other brotherhood of the day of the neighborhood of Capuchinos, Our Father Jesus of the Arrest has its throne representing the moment of the arrest of Jesus and the kiss of Judas. In the second throne is placed Mary Most Holy of Great Forgiveness.

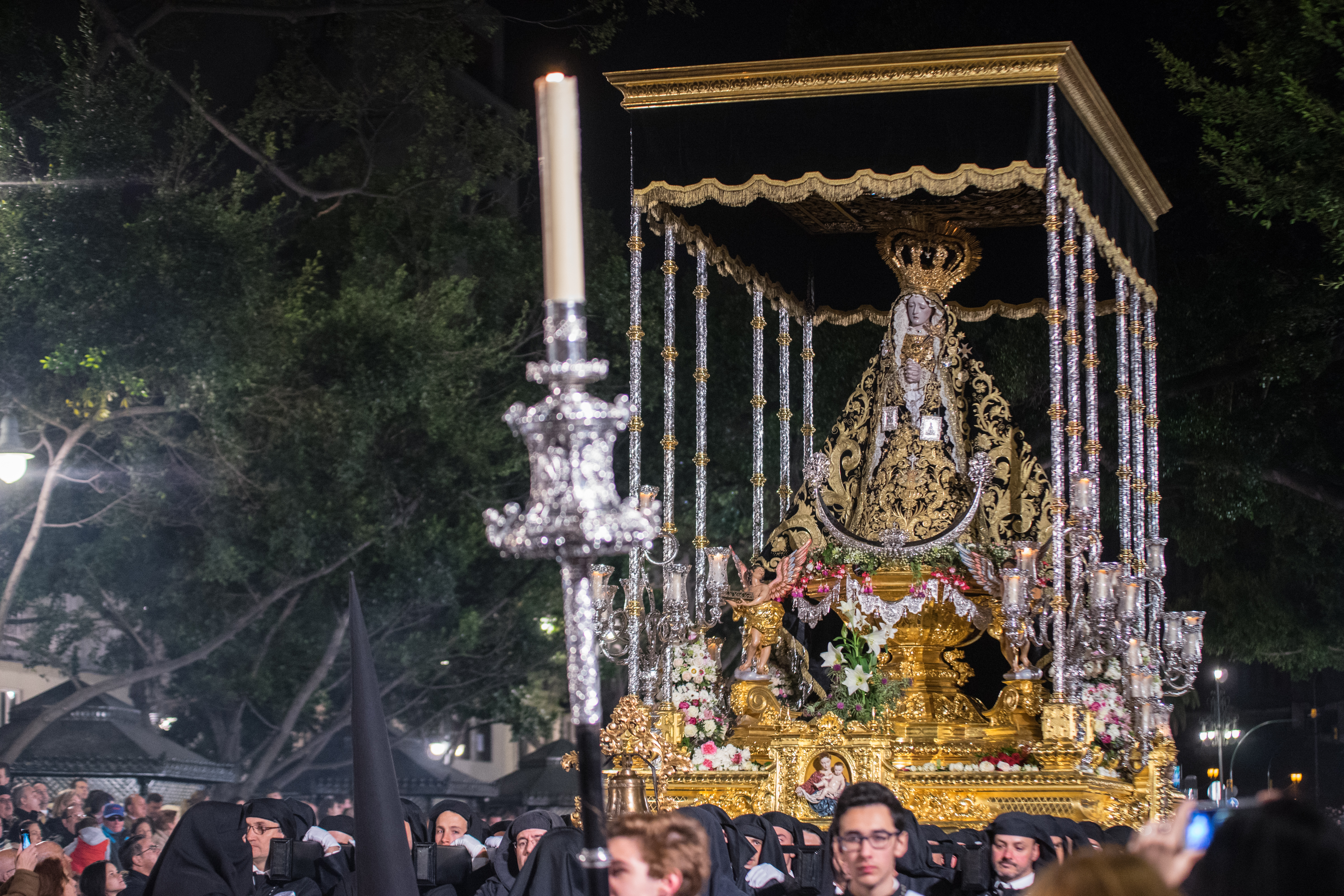
Our Lady Crowned of Sorrows

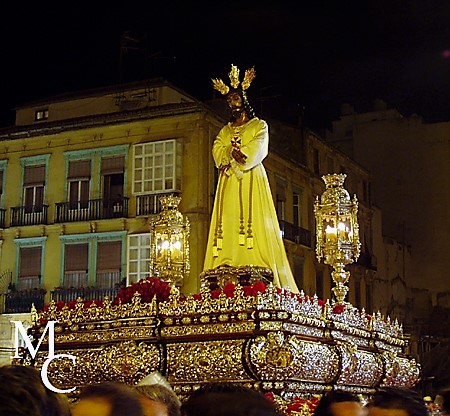
Our Father Jesus Captive

=== Holy Monday ===
On Holy Monday, six brotherhoods go in procession through the streets of Malaga.

- Brotherhood of the Crucifixion (Hermandad de la Crucifixión). It is the youngest brotherhood of the day, founded in 1977. The sculptures are the Most Holy Christ of the Crucifixion, which shows the moment in which he having been crucified, the Romans proceed to the distribution and lottery of their clothes, while the Penitent Thief and the Impenitent Thief await their execution, and Mary Most Holy of Major Sorrow in her Solitude.
- Brotherhood of the Gypsies (Hermandad de los Gitanos), The brotherhood of Our Father Jesus of the Column and Mary Most Holy of the O is known as "The Gypsies" by the number of gypsies who go back as devotees singing and dancing flamenco.
- Confraternity of the Sorrows of the Bridge (Cofradía de los Dolores del Puente) The Most Holy Christ of Forgiveness represents the moment when Jesus says to the Good Thief, "Amen I say to you today you will be with me in Paradise". Meanwhile, Our Lady Crowned of Sorrows is a carving from the 18th century.
- Archconfraternity of the Passion (Archicofradía de Pasión). It leaves from the Church of Saints Cyriacus and Paula. The sculpture of Our Father Jesus of the Passion represents Jesus carrying the cross helped by Simon of Cyrene, is one of the most notable pieces of Luis Ortega Bru. Behind is the throne of Mary Most Holy Sorrowful of Love.
- Brotherhood of the Students (Hermandad de los Estudiantes) The Brotherhood of the Holy Christ Crowned of Thorns and Our Lady of Grace and Hope is the procession that more Nazarenos participate. This brotherhood is linked to the University of Málaga. During the procession the Gaudeamus igitur is sung by the bearers as they carry the image of Christ.
- Confraternity of the Captive (Cofradía del Cautivo). It departs from the neighborhood of La Trinidad. Our Father Jesus Captive, known as the Lord of Málaga, is one of the sculptures with the most devotees in the city. Every year thousands of people march behind as devotees. Behind it is Mary Most Holy Crowned of the Trinity, who also has a lot of devotion.

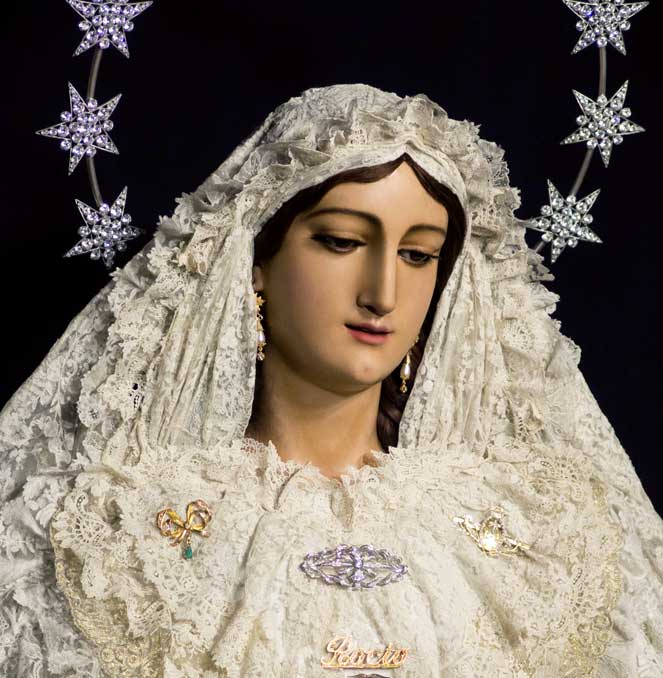
Mary Most Holy Crowned of the Dew, known as the Bride of Malaga

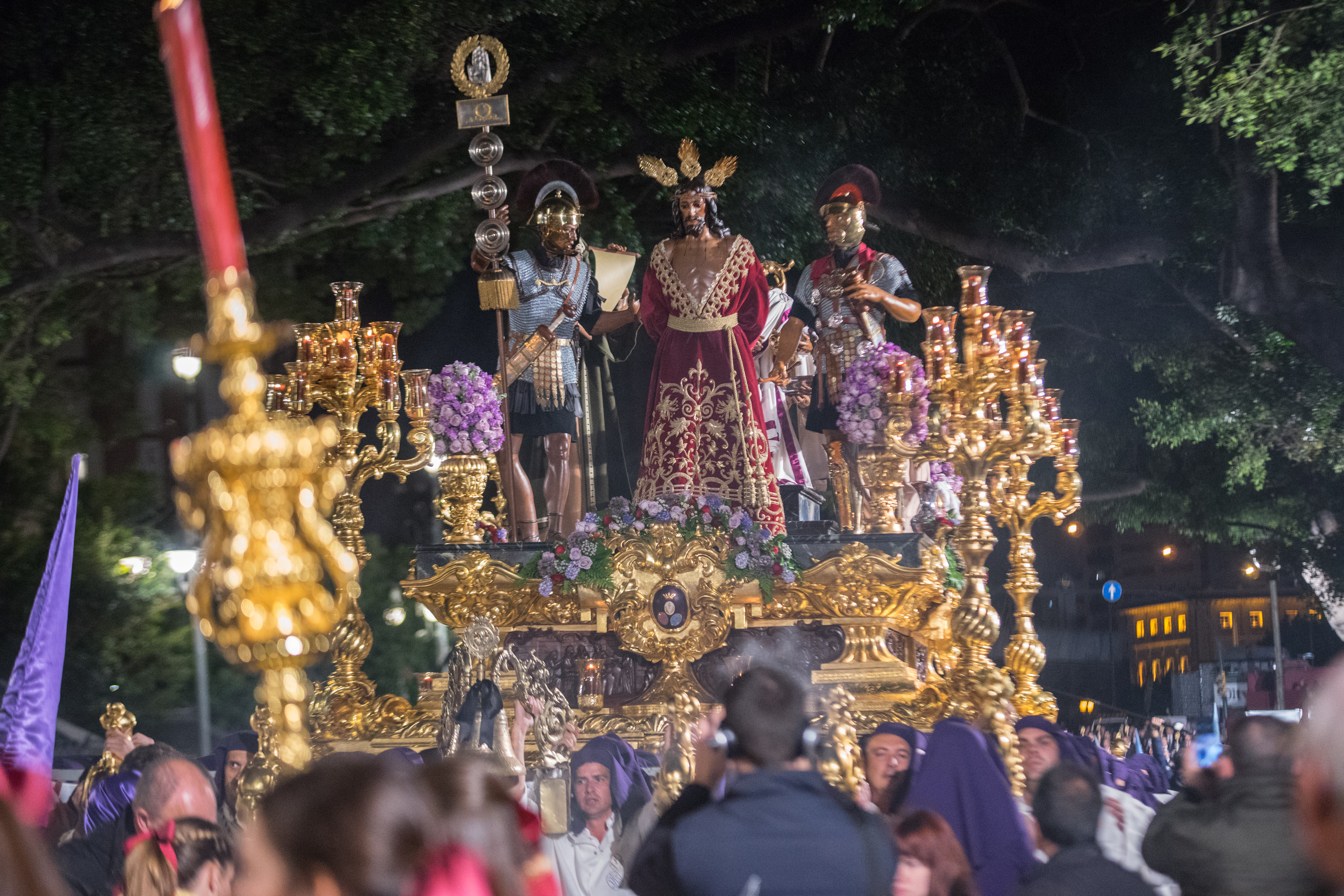
Our Father Jesus of the Sentence

=== Holy Tuesday ===
Six other brotherhoods participate in the processions this day through the streets of Málaga.

- Brotherhood of the Dew (Hermandad del Rocío). It comes from the neighborhood of La Victoria. The brotherhood of Our Father Jesus Nazarene of the Steps on Mount Calvary and Mary Most Holy Crowned of the Dew, known as the Bride of Málaga, is one of the most popular in Holy Week. The statue of Jesus represents one of the three falls while carrying the cross.
- Brotherhood of the Pains (Hermandad de las Penas). On the first throne, the Most Holy Christ of the Agony represents the moments before his death on the cross. Meanwhile, Mary Most Holy of the Pains is known for the cape of flowers that she carries made by the gardeners of the Town Council.
- Brotherhood of New Hope (Hermandad de Nueva Esperanza). From the neighborhood of Nueva Málaga leaves the brotherhood with the longest route in Holy Week, with a 14 hour procession. The sculptures are Jesus Nazarene of Forgiveness, which is a sculpture of Jesus carrying the cross, and Mary Most Holy of New Hope.
- Brotherhood of the Star (Hermandad de la Estrella). This brotherhood is formed by Our Father Jesus of Humiliation and Forgiveness, which represents the moment of Herod's contempt, and Mary Most Holy of the Star, a sculpture of the 18th century.
- Brotherhood of the Rescue (Hermandad del Rescate) The second brotherhood of the day from La Victoria district. Our Father Jesus of the Rescue represents the Arrest of Jesus in the Garden of Gethsemane. The second statue corresponds to Mary Most Holy of Grace. Both sculptures are the work of Antonio Castillo Lastrucci.
- Brotherhood of the Sentence (Hermandad de la Sentencia). The last brotherhood of the day is formed by Our Father Jesus of the Sentence, showing Pilate's court, and Mary Most Holy of the Rosary in her Sorrowful Mysteries. The law profession joins the procession on this day.

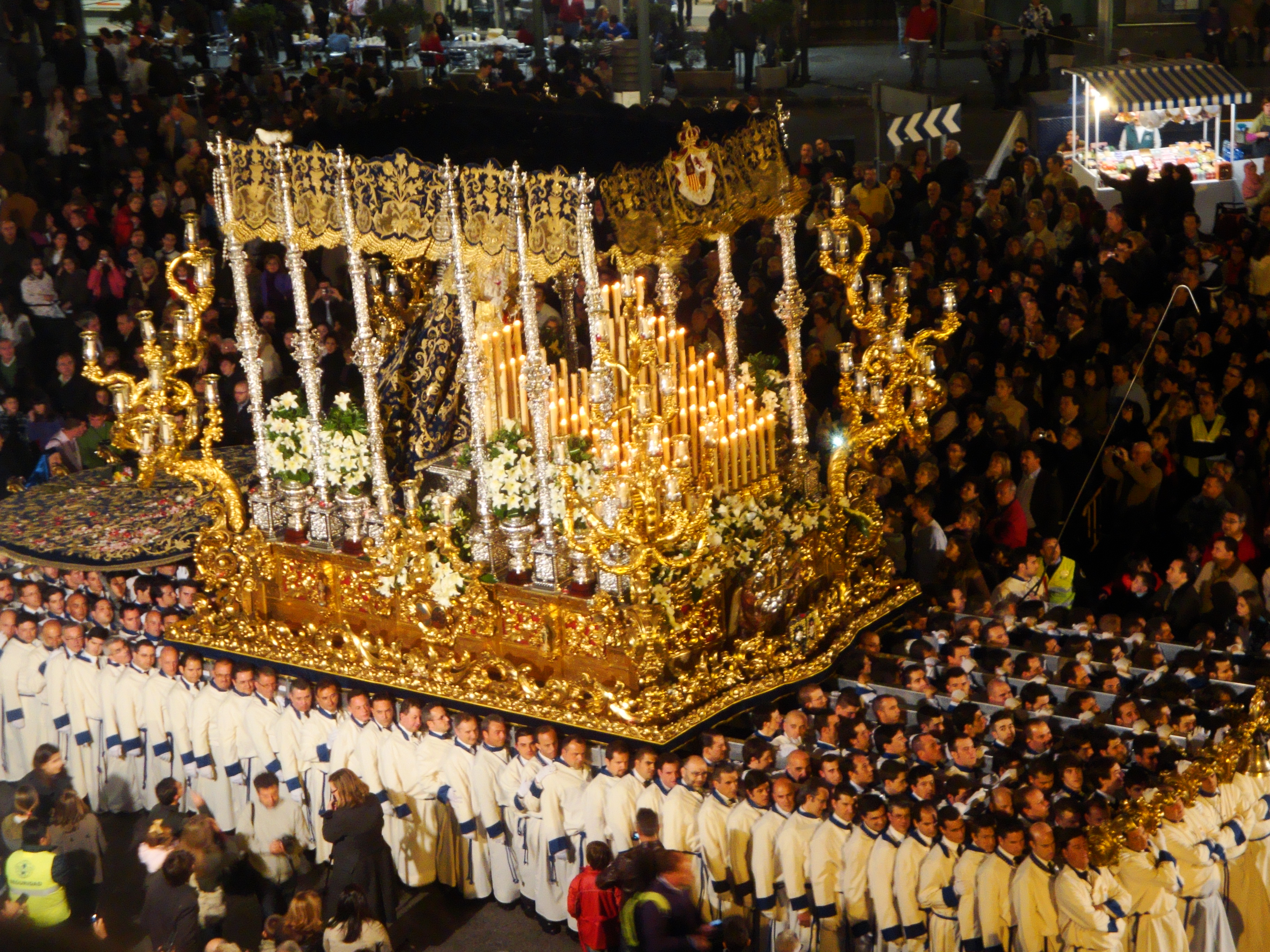
Throne of Mary Most Holy of the Dove

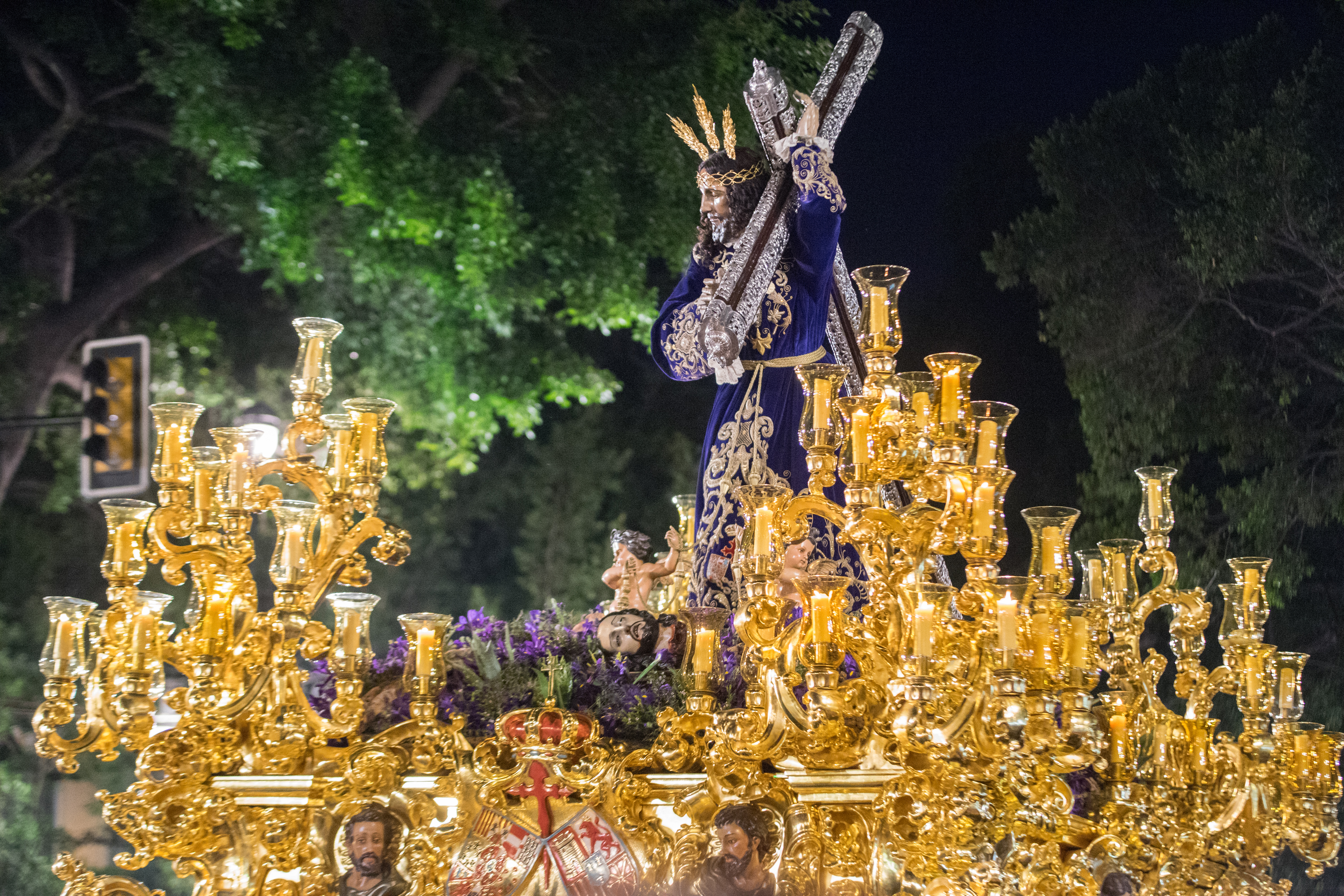
Our Father Jesus Nazarene titled "The Rich"

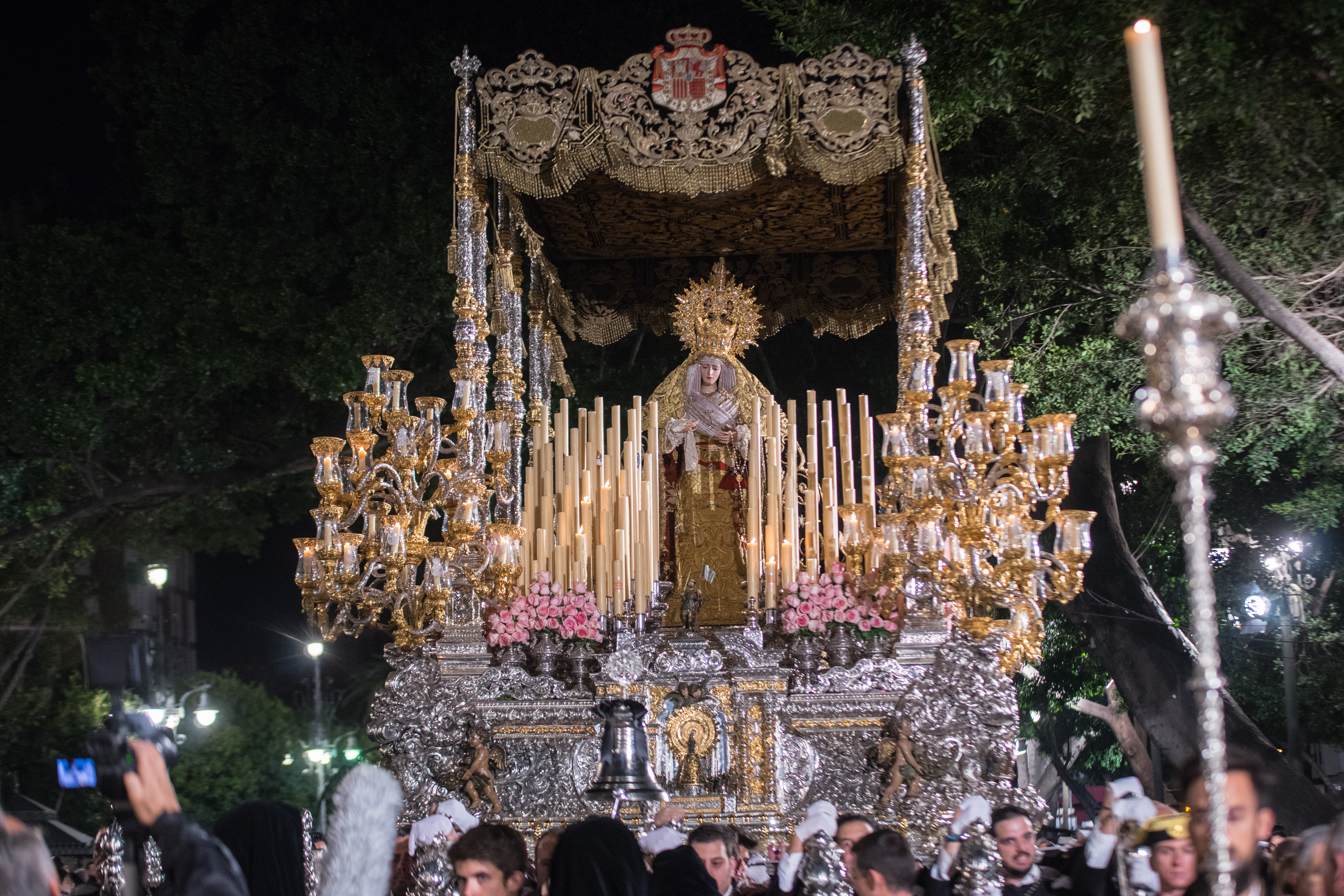
Mary Most Holy Crowned of Sorrows

=== Holy Wednesday ===
On this day, some of the oldest and most traditional brotherhoods participate in the processions. 7 brotherhoods with 15 thrones in total take to the streets of the city.

- Brotherhood of the Mediatrix (Hermandad de la Mediadora). It is one of the "cofradías" with the longest route, being also the newest organizations to join the Group of Confraternities. They carry the icons of Our Father Jesus Nazarene Redeemer of the World and Our Lady Mediatrix of Salvation.
- Brotherhood of Salesians (Hermandad de Salesianos): This brotherhood is one of the few with a single throne, the Holy Christ of Pains and Mary Most Holy, Help of Christians. It represents the moment when Jesus crucified in the presence of his own mother and of Saint John the Apostle, said to his mother, "Woman, behold your son" and he said to the disciple, "Behold your mother".
- Royal Merged Confraternities (Reales Cofradías Fusionadas). Departing from the Church of Saint John, this brotherhood brings to the street 4 thrones. The first with Jesus of Scourges and the Column shows the moment of the flagellation of Christ. The next corresponds to the Most Holy Christ of the Exaltation, which represents Jesus at the time of the raising of the Holy Cross in Golgotha. The third throne carries the sculpture of the Most Holy Christ of the Souls of the Blind, which was made in 1649 by the sculptor Pedro de Zayas, and which corresponds to the moment when Jesus had died on the Cross. It is accompanied by the Paratrooper Brigade. The last sculpture corresponds to Our Lady of Major Sorrow.
- Brotherhood of the Dove (Hermandad de la Paloma). Mary Most Holy of the Dove is carried by 280 bearers on one of the heaviest thrones. Throughout the procession hundreds of pigeons fly around the throne. The first statue, Our Father Jesus of the Bridge of Kidron, represents the moment when Jesus, after being caught in the Garden of Olives, is taken to the house of Annas, passing through a stream called Kidron.
- Confraternity of Jesus "The Rich" (Cofradía de Jesús "El Rico") The icon of Our Father Jesus Nazarene Titled "The Rich" represents Jesus carrying the cross. Each year, since the mid-18th century, the brotherhood releases a prisoner, in a yearly ceremony that was established by King Carlos III. The other sculpture being paraded corresponds to Mary Most Holy of Love. Both are accompanied by the National Police Corps.
- Archconfraternity of the Blood (Archicofradía de la Sangre). It is the oldest brotherhood of the Holy Week of Malaga, founded in 1507. The sculptural group of the Most Holy Christ of the Blood represents the moment when Saint Longinus pierced Jesus in his side with a lance. In the second throne is located Mary Most Holy of Consolation and Tears.
- Archconfraternity of the Expiration (Archicofradía de la Expiración). The Most Holy Christ of the Expiration is a masterpiece of Mariano Benlliure y Gil, representing the last breath of Christ. Behind it is Mary Most Holy Crowned of Sorrows, carried on one of the heaviest thrones of Holy Week. Joining them is a contingent from the Civil Guard.

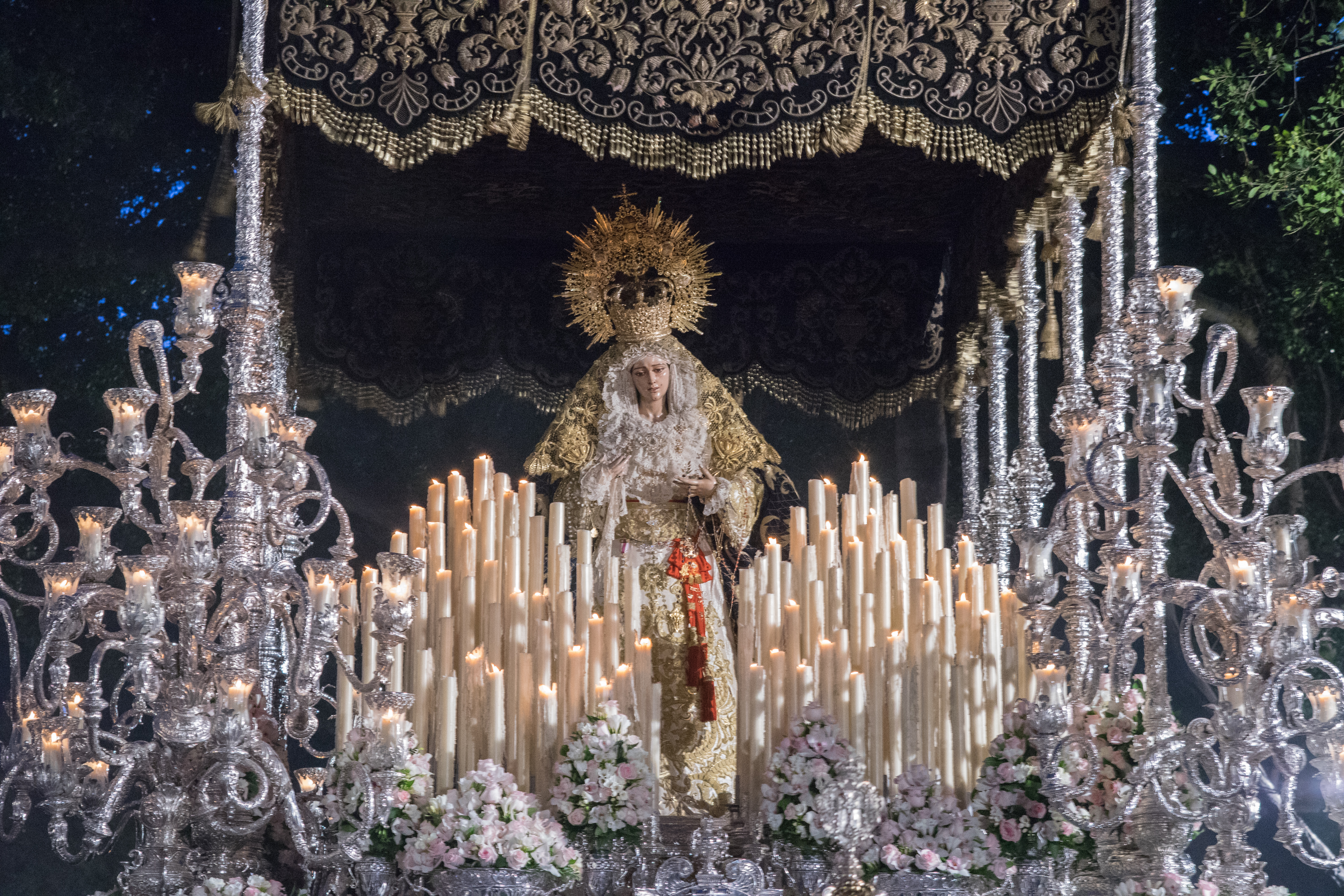
Mary Most Holy of Peace

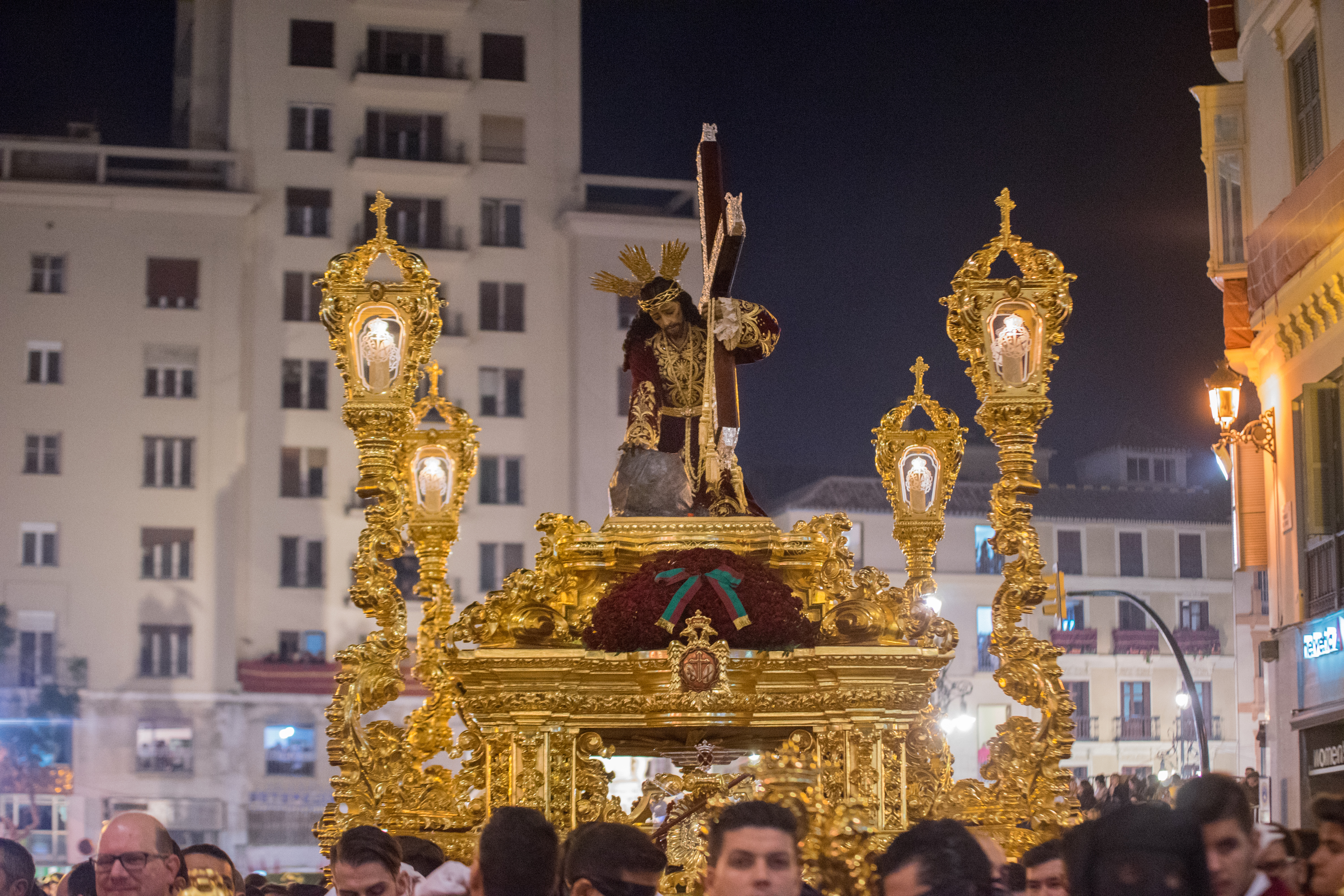
Our Father Jesus of Mercy

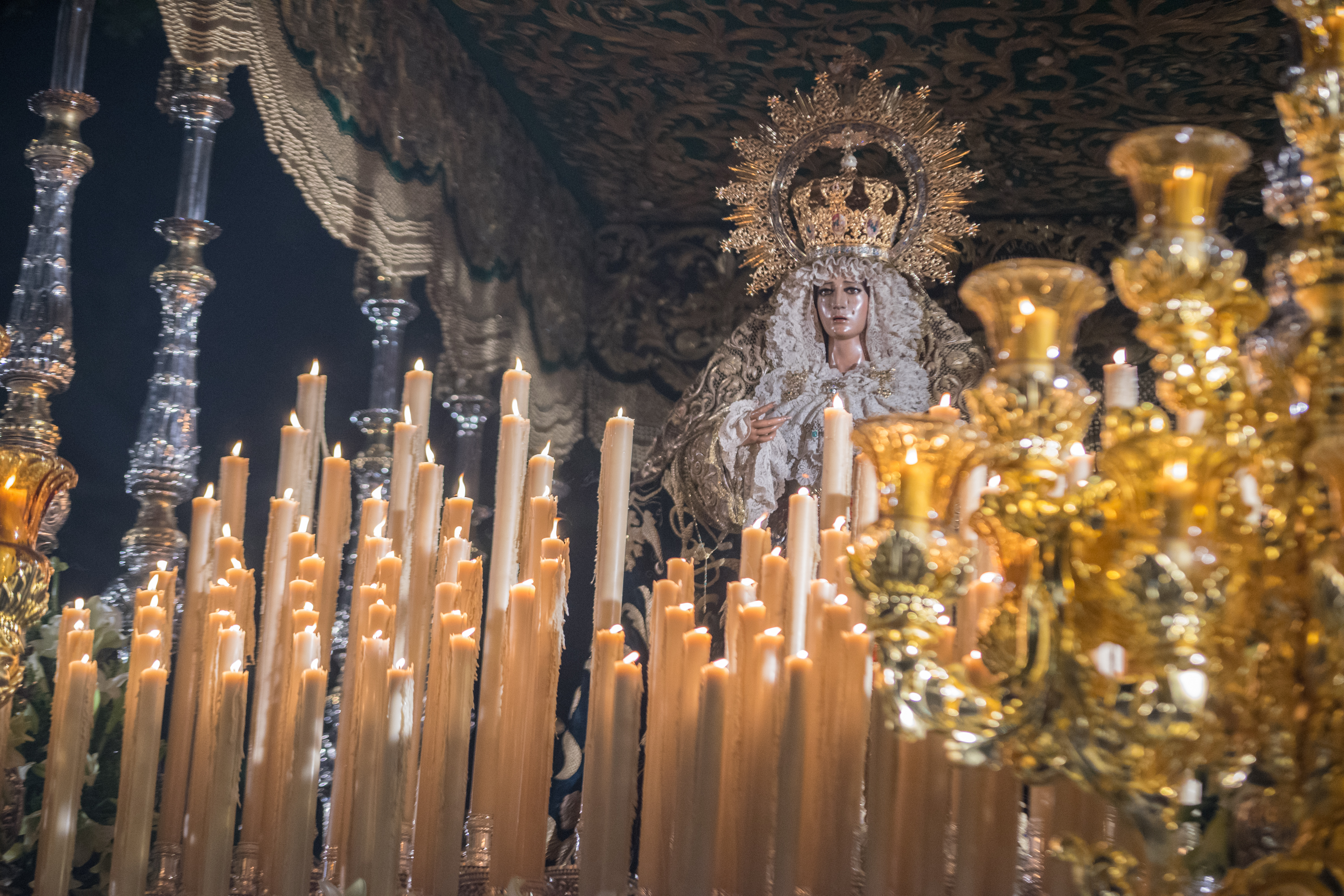
Mary Most Holy Crowned of Hope

=== Holy Thursday ===
Holy Thursday is another day where some of the most popular and historic brotherhoods take part. 8 brotherhoods participate on this day.

- Brotherhood of the Holy Cross (Hermandad de la Santa Cruz). The first procession is the brotherhood of the Holy Cross, which begins at about 15:15 from the Church of Saint Philip Neri.
- Brotherhood of the Holy Supper (Hermandad de la Sagrada Cena). The first throne represents the Last Supper of Jesus with his apostles, being one of the heaviest thrones of Christ of Holy Week. In the second throne is located Mary Most Holy of Peace.
- Brotherhood of the Vineyard Owners (Hermandad de Viñeros). This brotherhood was founded by viticulturists from Málaga in the year 1615. The sculptures correspond to Our Father Jesus Nazarene of the Vineyard Owners, which represents Jesus carrying the cross, and Our Lady of Transfer and Solitude of the Vineyard Owners.
- Congregation of Mena (Congregación de Mena). It is one of the most popular brotherhoods. The Most Holy Christ of the Good Death is accompanied throughout the procession by the Spanish Legion while they sing El novio de la Muerte (The Bridegroom of Death). The image of Our Lady Crowned of Solitude is carried on a second throne, which is accompanied by the Spanish Navy. It is one of the biggest and most covered of the processions, with full-blown media coverage given to the Legion and its veterans attending the rites.
- Brotherhood of Mercy (Hermandad de la Misericordia). It comes from the church of the Carmel in the neighborhood of El Perchel. It has the thrones of Our Father Jesus of Mercy, which depicts Jesus' fall with the cross, and Our Lady of Great Power. The Procession, another of the more awaited, is accompanied by a contingent from the Spanish Air and Space Force.
- Brotherhood of Zamarrilla (Hermandad de Zamarrilla). The Most Holy Christ of the Miracles shows Jesus dying on the cross, while the Mary Most Holy Crowned of Bitterness "Zamarilla" is known as such due to the legend of the brigand Zamarilla who fled from the guards. He hid under the cape of the Virgin and got to escape, so as gratitude he placed to the Virgin a white rose which turned red. Since then, the Virgin's image carries a red rose on her chest and is known as the Virgin of Zamarrilla.
- Archconfraternity of Hope (Archicofradía de la Esperanza). This brotherhood, which dates back to the 16th century, is one of the most popular of Holy Week. The image of Jesus Nazarene of the Step on the first throne, the work of Mariano Benlliure y Gil, shows Jesus carrying the cross and every year makes the blessing to the people of Málaga in the Plaza de la Constitución. The second image is of Mary Most Holy Crowned of Hope, which has much devotion.
- Most Holy Christ of the True Cross and Blood (Santísimo Cristo de la Vera+Cruz y Sangre). Belonging to the Royal Merged Confraternities, the Most Holy Christ of the True Cross and Blood is the oldest image of Christ in the city, dated in the 16th century. Its silent procession, the last of the night, is a unique feature of the festivities.

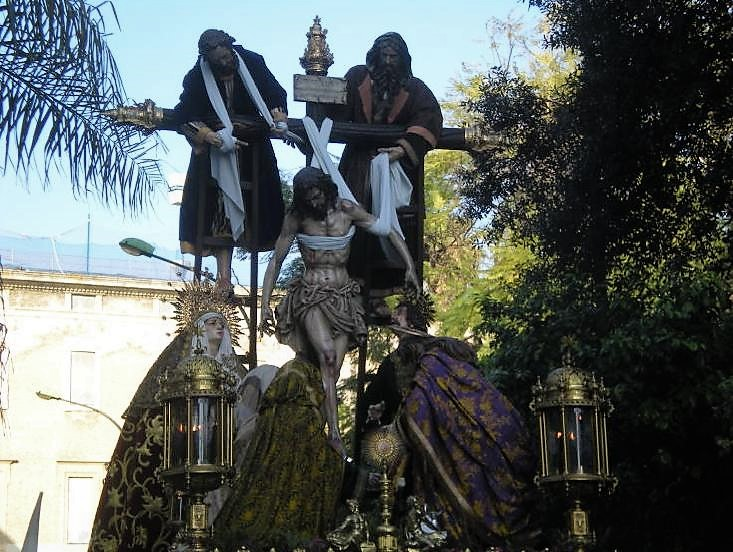
Brotherhood of the Descent

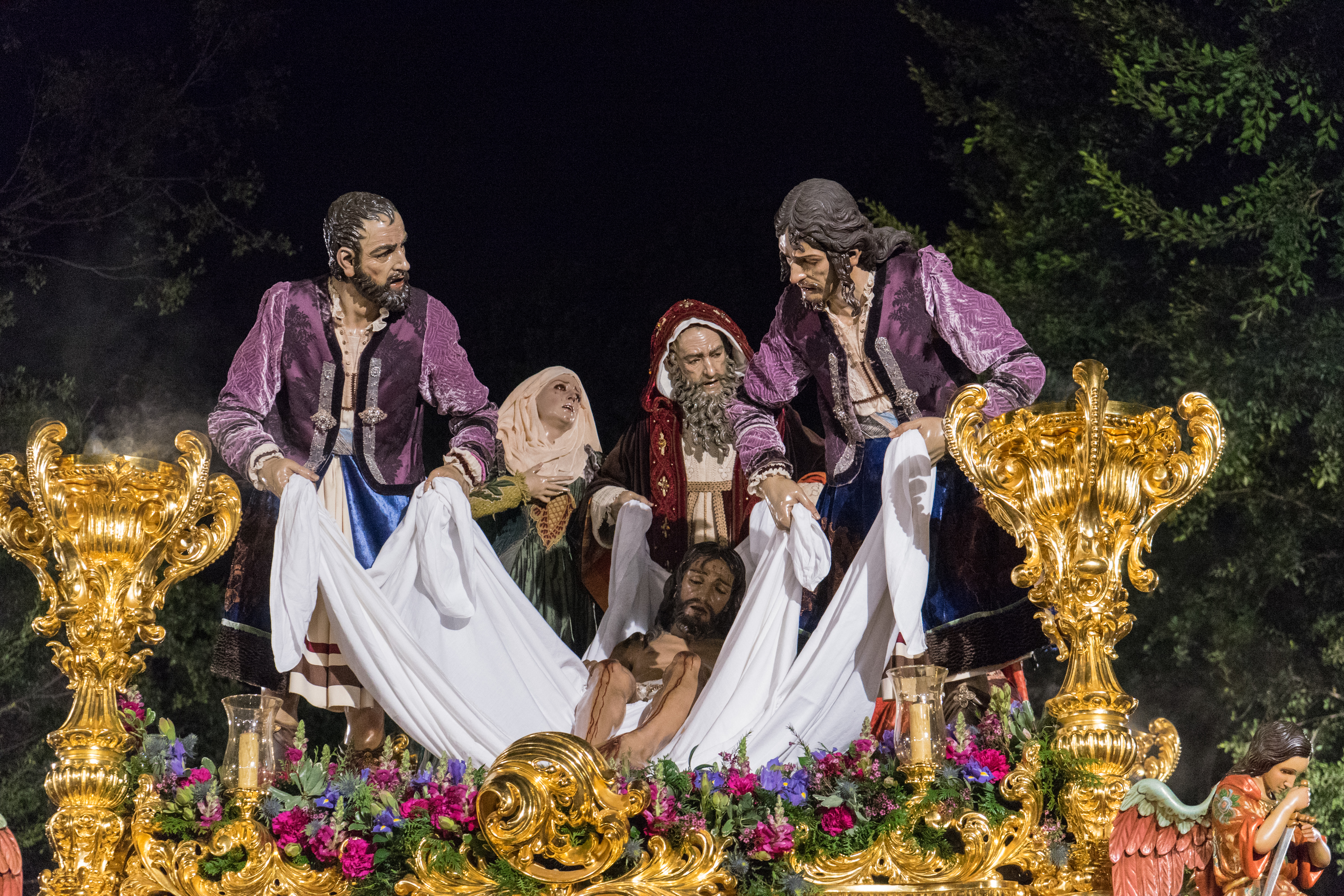
Brotherhood of the Holy Transport

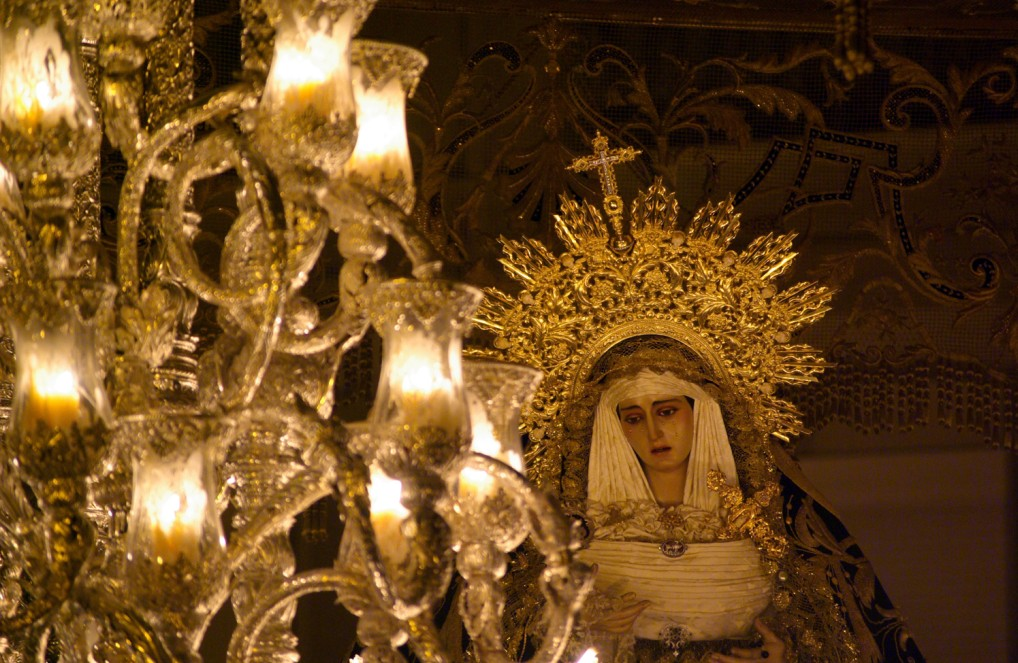
Our Lady of Solitude of the Brotherhood of the Holy Sepulchre

=== Good Friday ===
The "cofradías" that participate in this day usually are "cofradías" showing the seriousness of the occasion being marked.

- Archconfraternity of the Sorrows of San Juan (Archicofradía de Dolores de San Juan). From the Church of Saint John leaves this Brotherhood, with their images representing Jesus dying on the cross and Our Lady of Sorrows. Each throne is accompanied by a musical chapel, basically a wind chamber ensemble.
- Brotherhood of Mount Calvary (Hermandad del Monte Calvario). This brotherhood begins from the Shrine of Victory. The first throne shows the moment Jesus is wrapped in a shroud, while the second throne is an image of Holy Mary of Mount Calvary.
- Brotherhood of the Descent (Hermandad del Descendimiento). The first throne represents the descent of Christ from the cross, a sculpture of Luis Ortega Bru. The second throne carries the image of Mary Most Holy of Anguishes. It has its location in the Hospital Noble next to the bullring La Malagueta.
- Brotherhood of the Holy Transport (Hermandad del Santo Traslado). It departs from the neighborhood of La Trinidad. The first throne represents the transfer of Christ to the Sepulchre. In the second there is the statue of Our Lady of Solitude, one of the few virgins that do not go under canopy but she appears kneeling at the foot of the cross.
- Brotherhood of Love (Hermandad del Amor). This procession starts from the neighborhood of Victory, formed by the Most Holy Christ of Love, Christ died on the cross dated in the 18th century, and Our Lady of Charity.
- Brotherhood of the Pieta (Hermandad de la Piedad). The Brotherhood of Pieta shows the Virgin Mary cradling the dead body of Jesus, after the descent, known as the Pieta moment, its only throne. This contingent comes from the neighborhood of El Molinillo.
- Brotherhood of the Holy Sepulchre (Hermandad del Santo Sepulcro). It is the official brotherhood of the city for that reason in the procession the members of the local government participate. In the first throne it shows Jesus dead in the Sepulchre, the sculpture is carried on a magnificent catafalque designed by José Moreno Carbonero and completed by local artist Félix Granda y Álvarez Buylla in 1926. Traditionally, the funeral march of Chopin is played whenever this brotherhood marches. In the second throne, stationed behind the Holy Sepulchre, is the image of Our Lady of Solitude, in mourning clothes. As it is the official brotherhood of Malaga, it is one of the more covered, with the Mayor of Malaga usually joining the brotherhood leading members of the City Council.
- Order of Services (Ordén de Servitas). It has the privilege of closing the processions of Good Friday. The image of Mary Most Holy of Sorrows, a work of Fernando Ortiz of the 18th century, is carried on the smallest throne of Holy Week. All street lights are turned off from the streets where the procession goes.

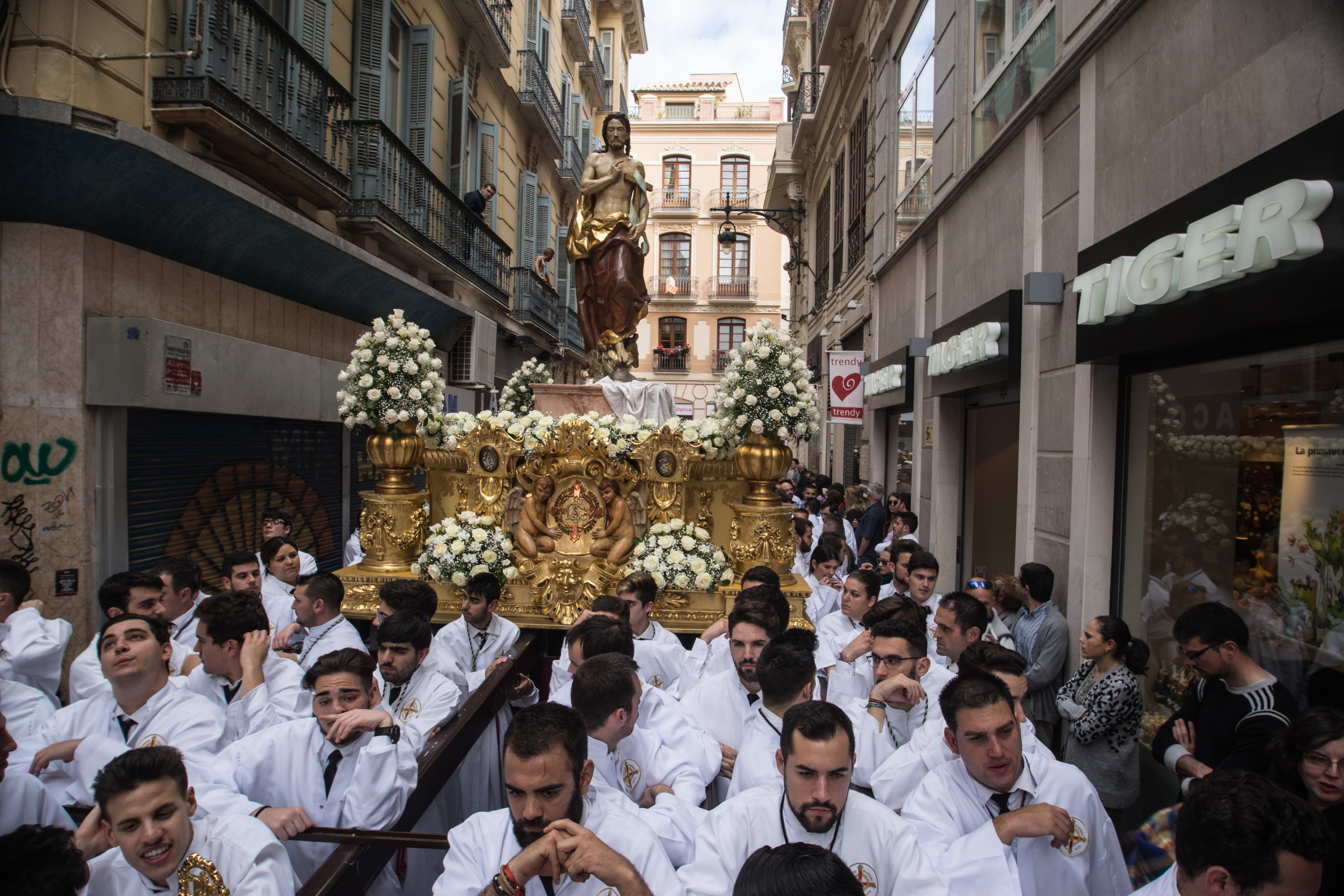
Most Holy Christ Resurrected

=== Easter Sunday ===
The procession of the Most Holy Christ Resurrected and Mary Most Holy Queen of the Heavens is the last procession of Holy Week. This procession is organized by the Group of Confraternities and in it all the brotherhoods attend. The floats depict the meeting of Jesus and his Mother after He had been raised from the dead. Their presence signals the end of Holy Week celebrations in this city.

== See also ==
- Holy Week
- Holy Week in Spain
- Fiestas of International Tourist Interest of Spain
