= Antonio Castillo (breakdancer) =

American breakdancer

Antonio Castillo (born circa 1985) is an American breakdancer.

== Life ==
Castillo started breakdancing at 5 years old in Aguascalientes, Mexico. He moved to Virginia with his family when he was 9 years old.

In 2011, Castillo decided to devote his career to breakdancing and opened the Lab Breakin’ School in Washington, D.C. This school was among the first in the United States to specialize in breakdancing as both dance and competitive sport, and had over 700 students as of 2020. He is the founder of The Competitive Break-in' League, and creator of The Box, a competitive breakin' arena, and The Lace Breakin' Curriculum Program.

Castillo also advocated for recognition of breaking as an Olympic sport; it debuted at the 2024 Summer Olympics in Paris.
