= Antonio Castillo Lastrucci =

Spanish sculptor

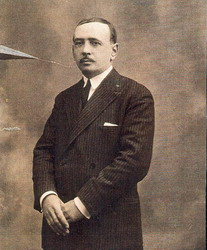
Antonio Castillo Lastrucci

Antonio Castillo Lastrucci (February 27, 1882 - November 29, 1967) was a Spanish sculptor, focused in religious works. His works can be found in the Cathedral of St Mary of the Assumption in Ceuta, several churches of Seville, and in other parts of Spain.
