= Semana Santa =

Observance of Holy Week in Spanish speaking cultures

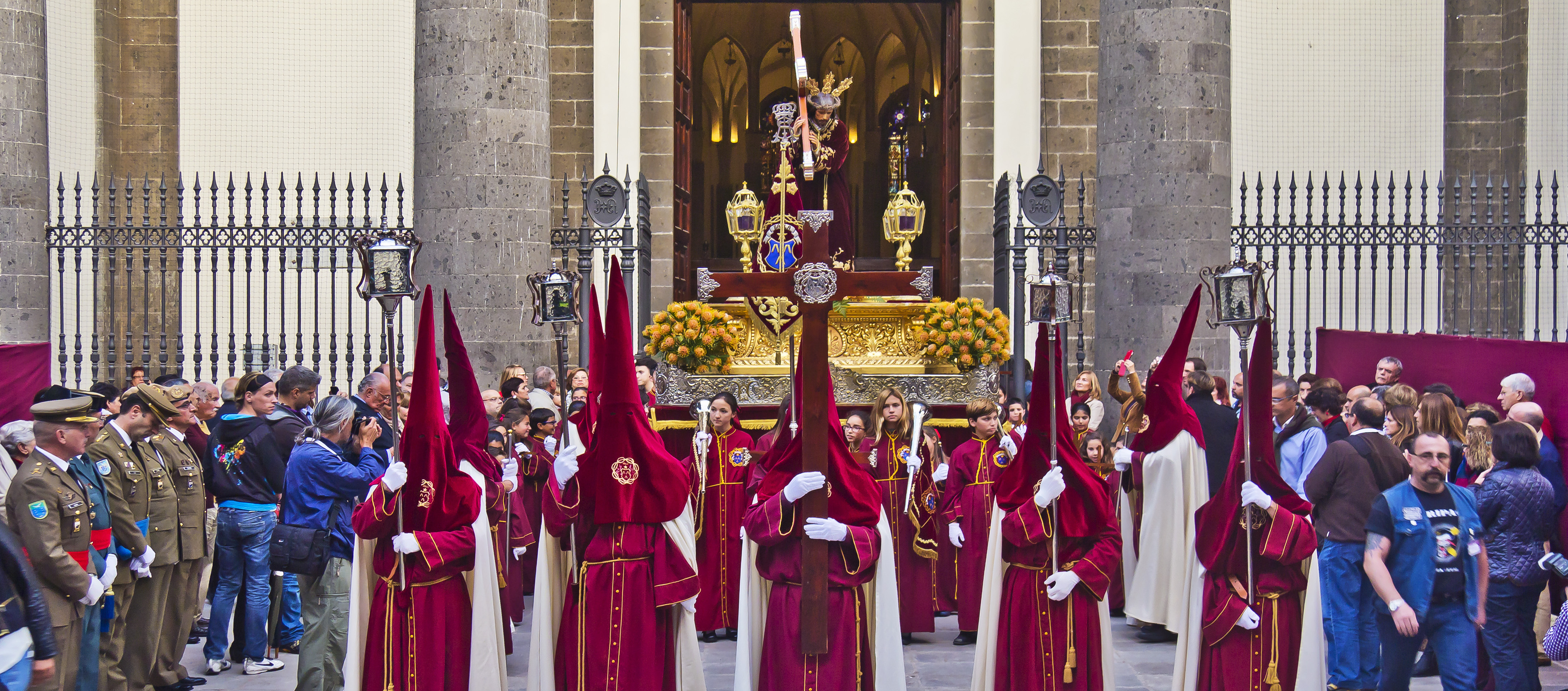
Semana Santa in La Laguna

Semana Santa is the Spanish term for Holy Week, the final week of Lent leading to Easter. In Spanish speaking cultures, as well as in the Philippines, this becomes an annual tribute of the Passion of Jesus Christ celebrated by Catholic religious brotherhoods (Spanish: cofradías) and confraternities that process on the streets of many towns and cities. In some parts of Latin America, it became part of the acculturation of pre conquest beliefs into Catholic culture.

== Spanish origins ==
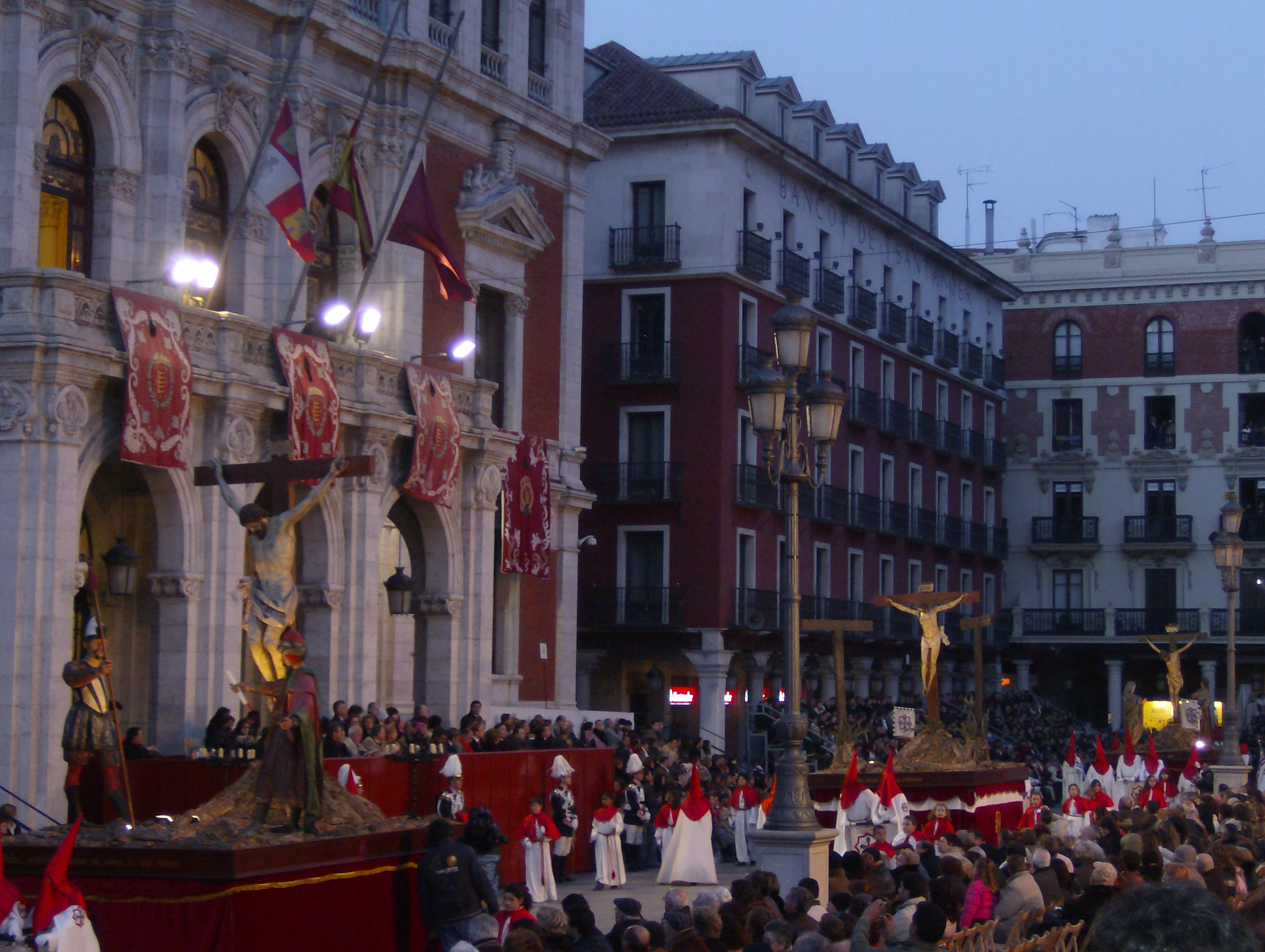
In Valladolid

In Spain, Semana Santa processions are among the most elaborate and culturally significant in the world. These events, rooted in medieval and Baroque traditions, are organized by Catholic brotherhoods (cofradías) that carry ornate floats (pasos) through the streets, depicting scenes from the Passion of Christ and the Sorrows of the Virgin Mary. Participants often wear penitential robes and conical hoods (capirotes), walk barefoot, or carry wooden crosses as acts of penance. While southern cities like Seville, Málaga, and Jerez de la Frontera are known for their dramatic and vibrant processions, northern regions such as Zamora, León, and Valladolid feature more austere and solemn commemorations. These processions combine religious devotion, public spectacle, art, music, and local identity, and many have been declared Festivals of International Tourist Interest by the Spanish government.

== Latin America ==
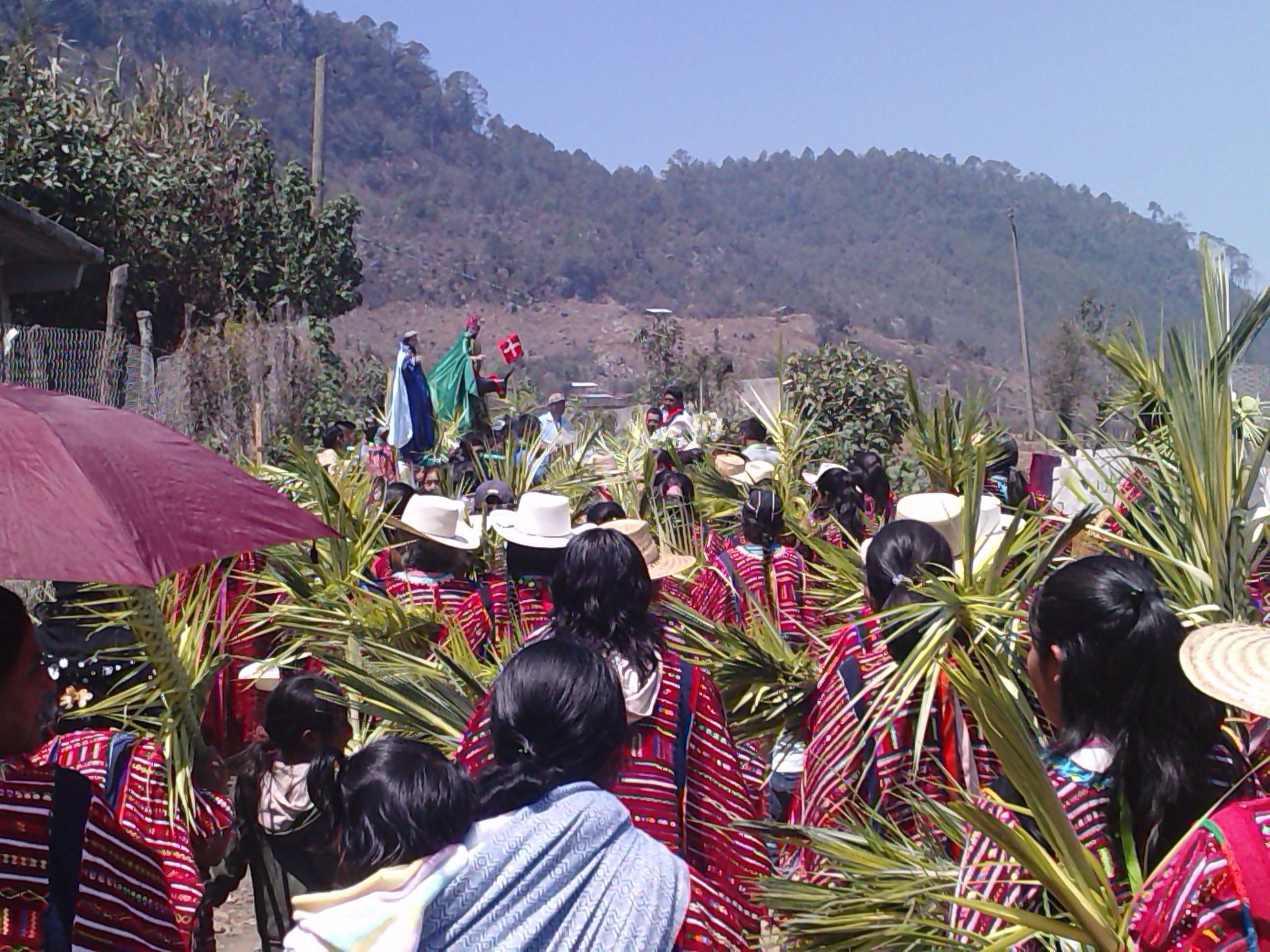
Palm Sunday procession of Trique people in Santo Domingo, Oaxaca

In many Spanish-speaking countries of Latin America, Semana Santa processions are among the most important religious and cultural events of the year. These processions, introduced during the Spanish colonial period, often mirror the structure and aesthetics of Spanish Semana Santa while incorporating local traditions and artistic expressions. In Mexico Spanish colonial traditions are often combined with indigenous influences, resulting in highly localized and varied observances. Cities like Iztapalapa, Taxco, and San Luis Potosí host elaborate passion plays and processions, with some involving thousands of participants reenacting the final days of Jesus's life, while rural and Indigenous communities incorporate unique regional customs. Guatemala also has elaborate processions during Holy Week which have drawn comparisons to Maya practices and survived despite some severe challenge from various anti-clerical regimes.

== Influence in Non Spanish speaking countries ==
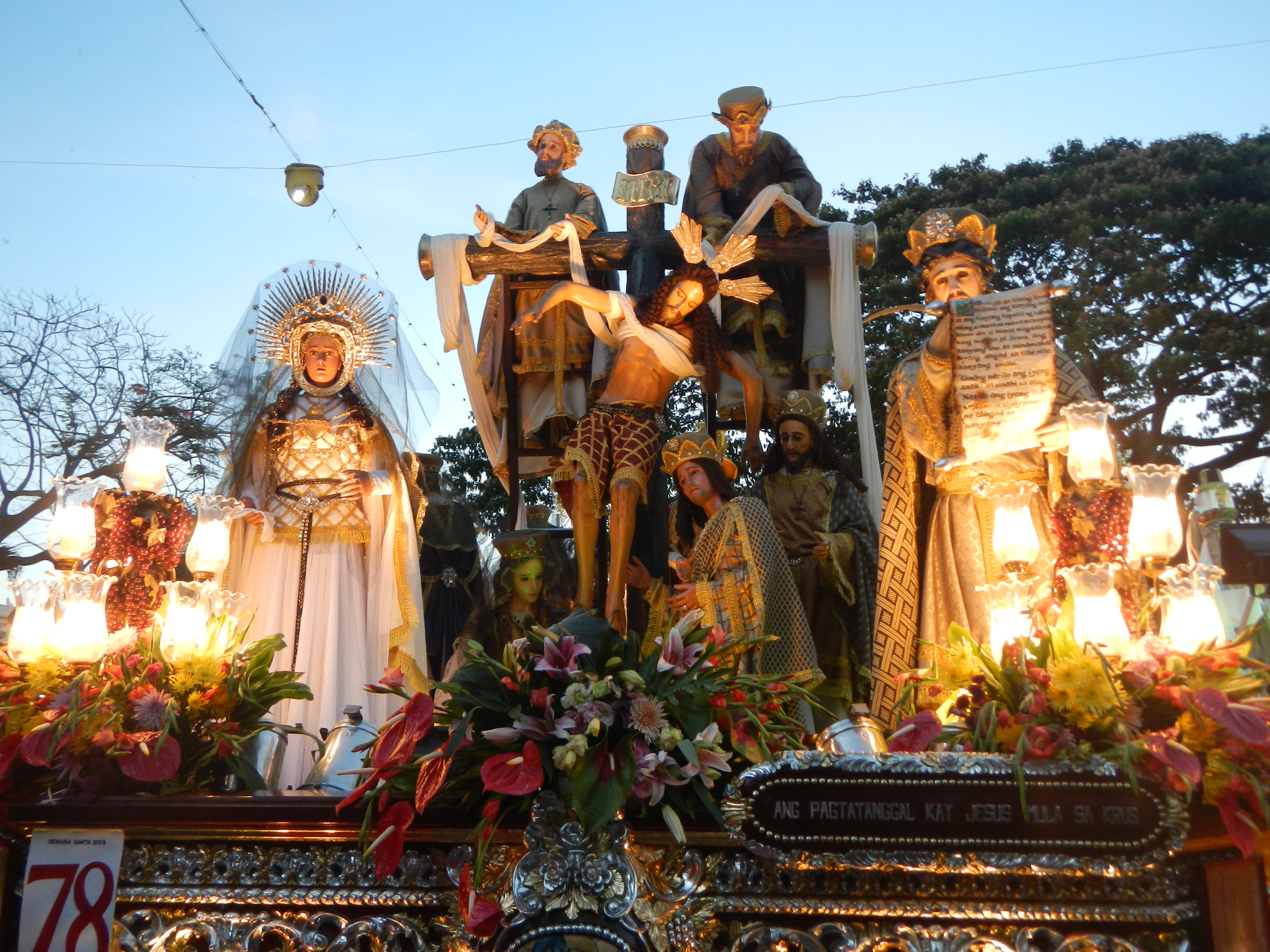
One of the 118 carrozas of the grand procession in Baliwag, the Philippines

The Philippines which was under Spanish control until 1898 shows a marked Spanish heritage, and the time is still known as Semana Santa. Other areas such as Sicily, have shown Spanish influence due to their time under Spanish control. In the Catalan speaking parts of France there are Sanch Processions which use many of the same elements as Holy Week processions in Catalan areas of Spain.

== Description ==
Holy Week regarding popular piety relies heavily on the processions of the brotherhoods or fraternities.

Membership is usually open to any Catholic person and family tradition is an important element to become a member or "brother" (hermano).

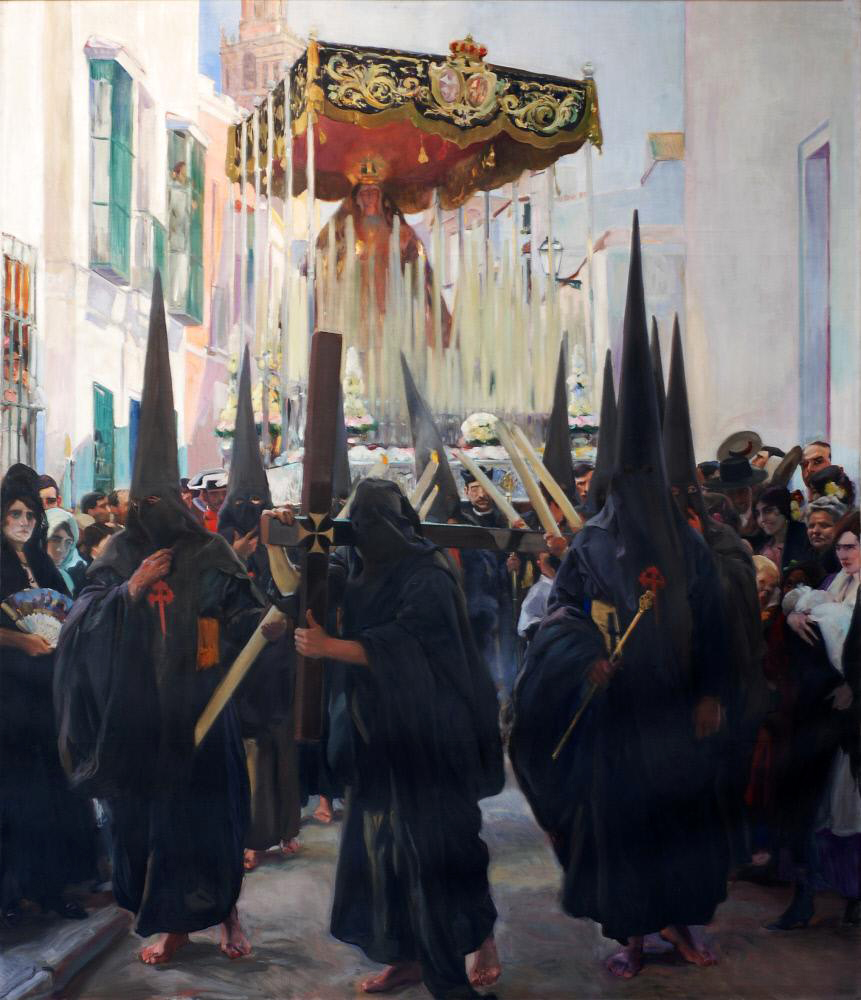
Sevilla. Los nazarenos, by Joaquín Sorolla (1914).

A common feature is the Nazareno or penitential robe for some of the participants in the processions. This garment consists of a tunic, a hood with conical tip (capirote) used to conceal the face of the wearer, and sometimes a cloak. The exact colors and forms of these robes depend on the particular procession. The robes were widely used in the medieval period for penitents, who could demonstrate their penance while still masking their identity. These nazarenos carry processional candles or rough-hewn wooden crosses, may walk the city streets barefoot, and, in some places may carry shackles and chains on their feet as penance.

The other common feature is that every brotherhood carries magnificent Pasos or floats with sculptures that depict different scenes from the gospels related to the Passion of Christ or the Sorrows of Virgin Mary. Brotherhoods have owned and preserved these "pasos" for centuries in some cases. Usually, the "pasos" are accompanied by marching bands performing "marchas procesionales", a specific type of composition devoted to the images and the confraternities.

== History ==
Penitential processions have their origins in the Middle Ages, with Zamora having the earliest documented penitential procession in 1179.

They were introduced by the Spanish later in other areas. There was a revival after the Middle Ages inspired by the Council of Trent and the Counter-Reformation and a second revival during the 20th and 21st centuries.

== Cultural Influence ==
Many Spanish speaking artists have included, recreated or used the Holy Week as a background in their creations, such as paintings, music, literature or movies, reflecting the cultural and social importance of these events. Painter Zuloaga, writers Antonio Machado and Federico García Lorca, composer Joaquin Turina and filmmaker Mateo Gil are some examples.

=== Noted sculptors of Holy Week pasos ===
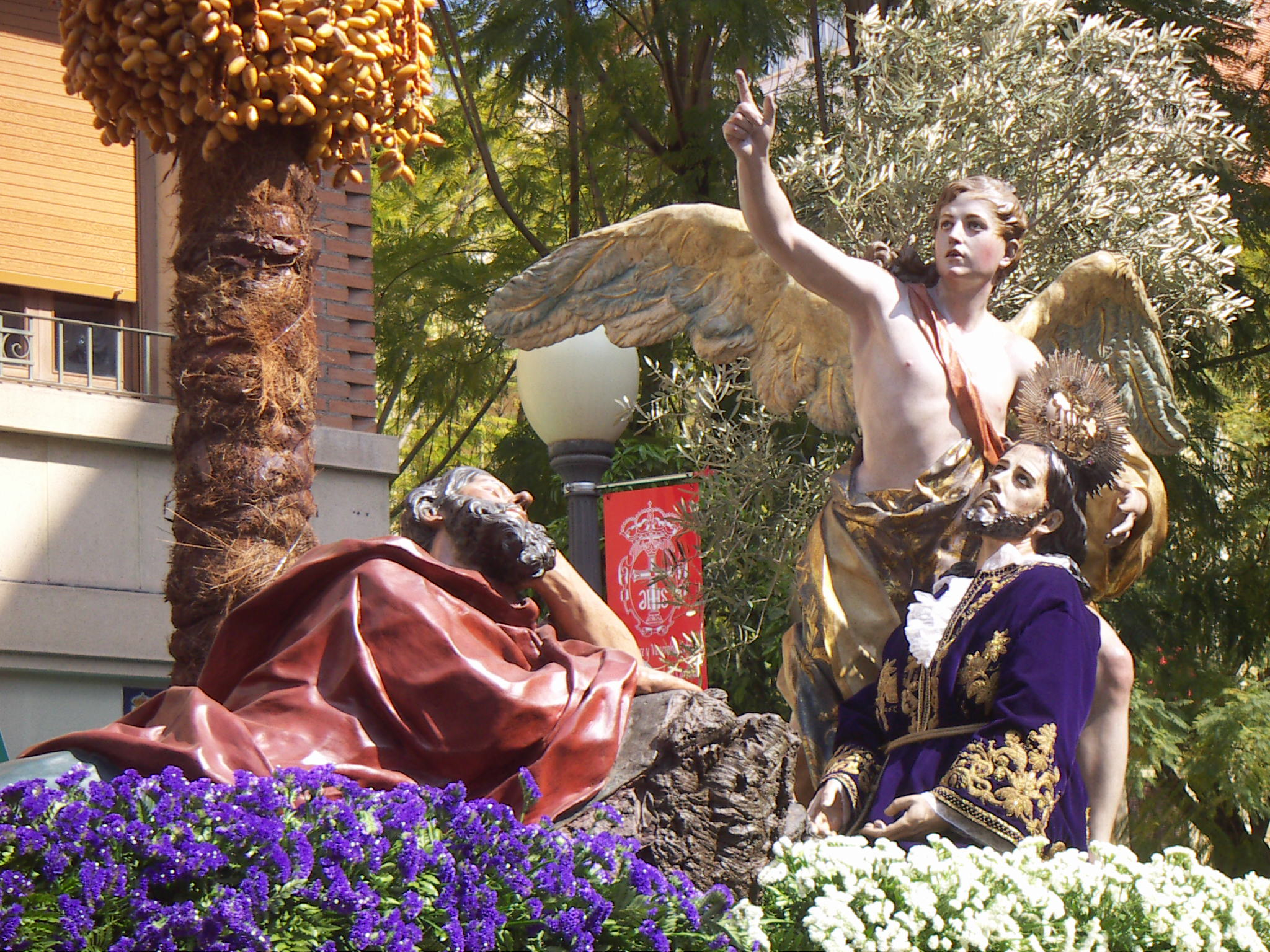
A float by Francisco Salzillo in Murcia

Many of floats are art pieces created by Spanish artists such as Gregorio Fernández, Juan de Mesa y Velasco, Juan Martínez Montañés or Mariano Benlliure y Gil.

Others have included:

- Gil de Siloé
- Juan de Juni
- Francisco Salzillo

== Semana Santa Celebrations ==
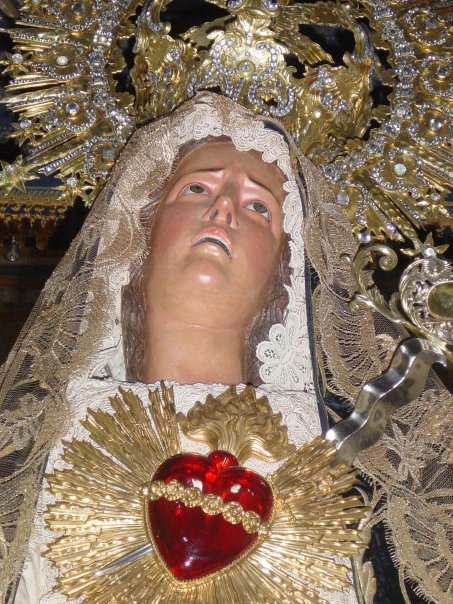
Statue from Popayán

=== Argentina ===
- La Boca, Buenos Aires, Salta, Cordoba, Mendoza, Neuquén

=== Colombia ===
- Popayán, Santa Cruz de Mompox

=== Honduras ===
- Comayagua, Tegucigalpa

=== Peru ===
- Arequipa, Ayacucho, Cusco, Huaraz, Tarma

=== Venezuela ===
- Caracas, Maracaibo, Barquisimeto, Maturín
