= Holy Week in Braga =

Christian observance in Braga, Portugal

Holy Week in Braga, Portugal, was officially "Declared of Interest to Tourism" in 2011.

== See also ==
- Catholic Church in Portugal
- Holy Week procession

== Bibliography ==
- CARDOSO, José (Introdução e versão anotada), Egéria – Peregrinações aos Lugares Santos do Médio Oriente, Edições APPACDM, Braga 1999.
- COSTA, Luís, Braga – Solenidades da Semana Santa, Editora Elo, Mafra 2002. Muito ilustrado, e com texto em português e inglês.
- COUTINHO, Jorge, “A Semana Santa de Braga e a Santa Casa da Misericórdia”, in revista Misericórdia de Braga nº 7 (2011) 13-44.
- FIGUEIREDO, Antero de, O Braguês, seguido de A Procissão dos Fogaréus, revisão de Ana Margarida Dias, Fundação Cultural Bracara Augusta, Braga 2000.
- MARIANO, Alexandra B., e NASCIMENTO, Aires A., Egéria. Viagem do Ocidente à Terra Santa, Edições Colibri, Lisboa 1998.
- MATOS, Sebastião, Breve nota das procissões da Semana Santa de Braga, Ed. do Autor, Areias de Vilar (Barcelos) 2003.
- OLIVEIRA, Eduardo Pires de, A Freguesia de São Victor – Braga, Edição da Junta de Freguesia de S. Victor, Braga 2001, pp. 198–200.
