= Holy Week in Popayán =

Celebration of the Passion of Jesus Christ in Colombia

Coordinates: 4.6155°N 74.0690°W

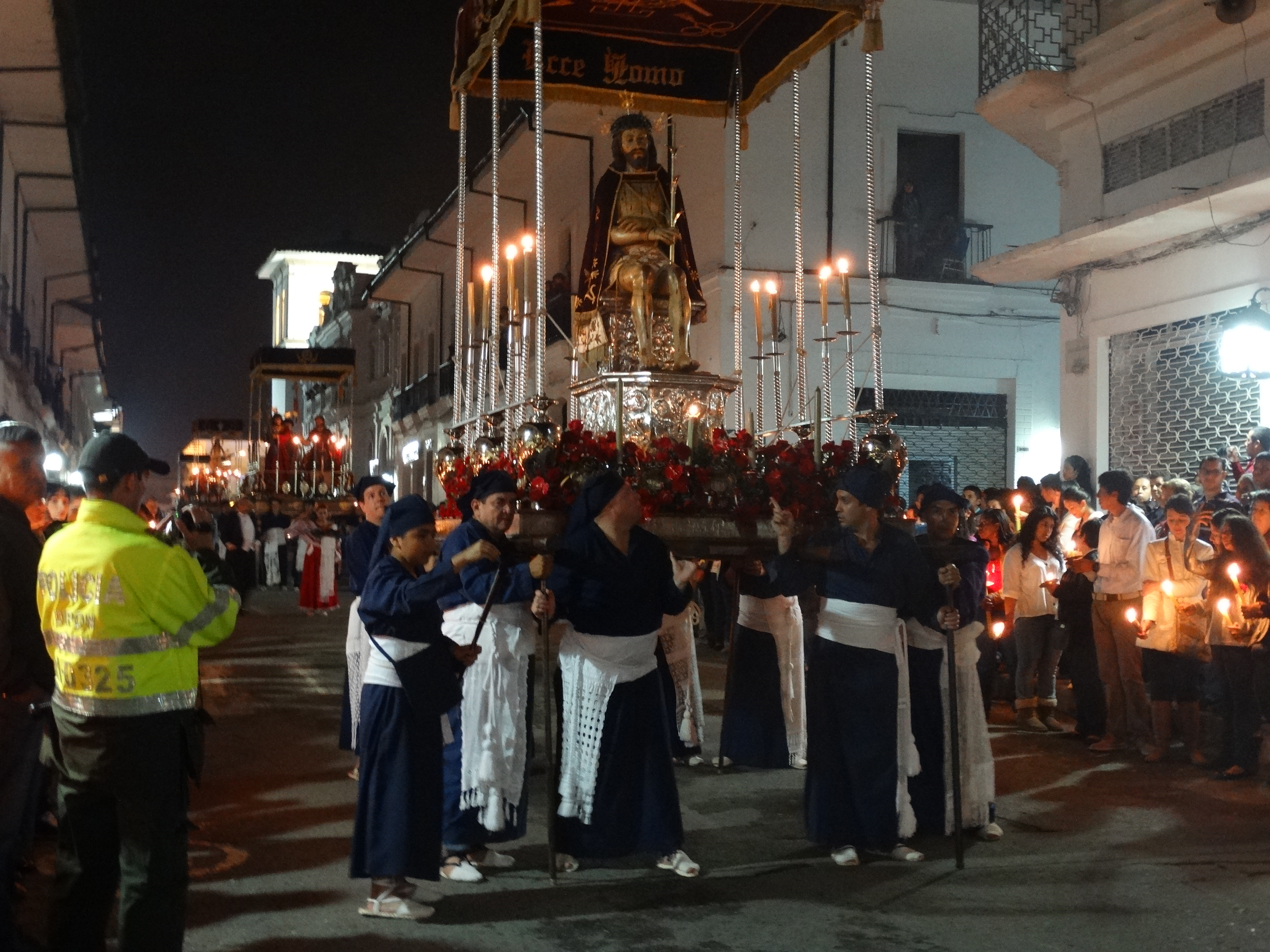
- Official name: Semana Santa
- Observed by: Popayán, Colombia
- Type: Religious, Historical, Cultural
- Significance: Commemoration of the passion, death and resurrection of Jesus
- Celebrations: Processions
- Begins: Friday of Sorrows
- Ends: Holy Saturday
- Frequency: Annual

Holy Week processions in Popayán
- UNESCO Intangible Cultural Heritage
- Country: Colombia
- Reference: 00259
- Region: Latin America and the Caribbean

Inscription history
- Inscription: 2009 (4th session)
- List: Representative

The Holy Week in Popayán, Cauca (Colombia), is the celebration of the Passion and death of Jesus Christ through daily processions continuously performed since the sixteenth century between Friday of Sorrows nights and Holy Saturday. The processions take place in the ancient streets of the "White City". Religious images of Spanish, Andalusian, Quito, Italian and Payanes arranged on a wooden platform with four front and four back "barrotes" (bars) are carried in the shoulders of the "Cargueros". These images are representations of different episodes recounted in the Gospels on the Passion, Crucifixion and Death of Jesus Christ. Each performance is a "paso" (step). The steps are taken through the streets, a distance of a cross-shaped layout since the time of the Conquest, passing by the main churches and temples of the city.

On September 30, 2009 it was declared a Masterpiece of the Oral and Intangible Heritage of Humanity by the UNESCO committee.

== History ==
From the time of the conquest, Popayán has the first information about processions made by the King entrusted those carrying large crosses and in the form of penance and mourning whipped through the principal streets of the parade behind the sacrum was performed. In 1558 Philip II signed the royal charters authorizing the processions in Popayán. With the advance of the time the parade grew and became very important, as was the case that by the early seventeenth century, an edict was issued by the authorities demanded the beautification of the balconies and the houses where the procession pass. The chronicler José María Vergara y Vergara in one of his writings from 1859 described the weeks of Popayán as a solemn and important to the people every year payanés received him with fervor and faith.

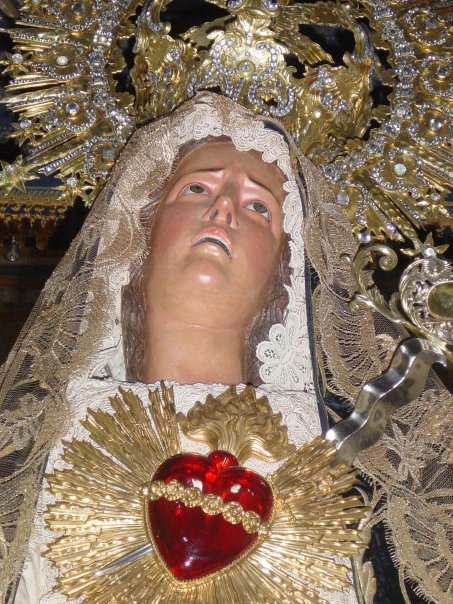
Our Lady of Sorrows. Image Spanish eighteenth century

The processions were acquired great importance and size over the years since it was increasing the number of images and ornaments that were enriched, this was thanks to economic and social development through the city during the Spanish period because Popayan became the political and economic center of the colony settled here since colonial institutions as the Royal Mint of Spain. Mining development in the Governorate of Popayán that processions will help great contribution in gold jewelry, silver and emeralds that embellished the images with crowns and jewels, the seats and litter. Mining was powered by Indian slave labor. Slaves had a life expectancy of three years. It was said one could never lose one's way to the mines of Popayán because the roads were lined with bones of dead Indians. Hanke, Louis. Las Casas and the Spanish Struggle for Justice in the New World. Most of the development of the procession was in the sixteenth, seventeenth and eighteenth Española.La colonial period most of the images are of Spanish origin and Quito as they were the most prominent art schools of the time, the gold in is mostly payanesa.

In the nineteenth century begins the period of independence and reduces the development in the processions due to war because most of the money was used for the cause of liberation. By the twentieth century it was the same for the economic crisis that lived Colombia.

== The processions ==
The processions of Holy Week opens with Cruz Alta, which is often accompanied by the acolytes, and with them the bell or on Good Friday for the rattle. These are followed by the military band of the National Police of Colombia, then follow the steps, headed by the passage of St. John the Evangelist (Holy Monday through Thursday), and ending every night with the Sorrowful (Tuesday through Good Friday).

During every night of the Easter parade between 9 and 17 steps leading up images of Christ, the Virgin Mary, St. John the Evangelist, St. Peter, Mary Magdalene, Veronica, and other important characters in Holy Week. The steps are echos on wooden platforms with 4 "bars" front and 4 back to the shoulders of those responsible for transporting (Cargo), only the steps leading up images of Christ and the Virgin Mary carrying the Palio or seat in symbol royalty, some are made in fine fabrics and gold embroidery. Some steps are wood carvings in their portfolios (and front sides of the step). Good Friday steps carry their wallets in tortoiseshell. Images are Spanish, Andalusian, Quito, Italian and Payan of the 16th to 20th centuries.

=== 16th century ===
Since the time of the foundation of Popayán have the first information about processions being documented from 1556. Such processions were made by encomendador is the King who carried large crosses and form of penance and mourning flogged through the main streets behind the sacrum parade was held. In 1558, Philip II signed the royal decree authorizing processions in Popayan.

When the processions in 1556 began had been prepared by the displaced natives who came from Peru, a conspiracy against Popayán to try to reconquer the city and when they reached the hills that surrounded it in the evening hours saw an endless line of moving lights that enveloped her and imagining that it was a gigantic army with torches and spears terrified withdrew when in fact it was the procession of penitents Holy Thursday, narrating Juan de Castellanos in their Elegies of Illustrious Men of the Indies

=== 17th century ===
With the advance of time parades they grew and became very important, as was the case for early 17th century was issued with an edict by the authorities demanding the beautification of balconies and houses where the processions pass. The chronicler José María Vergara y Vergara in one of his writings in the year 1859 described the greatest week of Popayán as a solemn and important act for Payanes people each year received it with fervor and faith.

its origin and organization is also due to the brotherhoods that began in Popayán for years after the founding of this city. Among the brotherhoods that stand out they are:

- Brotherhood of the Clean and Immaculate Conception Cathedral Popayan.
- Confraternity of the Rosary of the Order of Preachers (created in 1588)
- Brotherhood of Santa Catalina and Santa Barbara (it was attributed the construction of the Chapel of Jesus Nazareno in 1617)
- Confraternity of Jesus of Nazareth, the first patron of the city. Chapel of Jesus Nazareno (16th century)
- Brotherhood of Our Lady of Bethlehem (created on February 25, 1687)
- Brotherhood of the Lord of Vera Cruz

=== 18th century ===
The processions were gaining importance and size over the years since it was increasing the number of images and ornaments that were enriching, this occurred for economic and social development through the city during the Spanish period because Popayan became the economic and political center of the colony since settled here colonial institutions like the Royal house of the Currency of Spain. Mining development of the government of Popayán helped the processions receive great contribution in jewelry and apparel gold, silver and emeralds and other gemstones that adorned the pictures, the seats are embroidered with gold and the litter were painted with gold leaf. Most of the development of the processions was in the sixteenth, seventeenth and eighteenth centuries period of the Spanish colony. Most of the images are of Spanish and quiteño origin as they were the most important imaginary schools of the time, the goldsmith mostly is payanesa

=== 19th century ===
When Simón Bolívar returned triumphant after the Battle of Ayacucho in the last week of October 1826, in Popayan complement many banquets and attention, organized in his honor a similar procession the Easter, which left the Church of St. Augustine and passed in front of the balconies of the house of the seventh race with sixth street where he stayed Simon Bolivar with his entourage from 24 to 30 October as evidenced by a plaque beside his entry port

On 14 April 1840, under the presidency of José Ignacio de Márquez and during the uprising in the south called the "War convents or supreme "José María Obando and Juan Gregorio known as the Sarria "supreme", leave their weapons during the holy week to participate in the procession of Holy Tuesday dresses freighters to Seville style as was the custom of the time, it is say with the hood covering his face. Thus carrying the spikes in hand, head to the Church of St. Augustine to take their respective bars in the passage of the Dolorosa and fulfill as freighters. To this date the procession went out at seven o'clock in the evening. However, as a security measure Obando and Sarria take their bars on the corner of the street Mascarón (street and traditionally in Popayán).

The regional government, under the command of Manuel José Castrillón, learns the presence of Obando and Sarria in the procession and orders the end of the parade, the insurgent leaders are arrested. The town of Popayán was favored Obando then prepares for help and avoid being taken prisoner and for this his friends and colleagues agree signal "dove". The plan was launched at the corner of Chapel of Jesus Nazareno where illuminants off their candles and "dove" they said picking up the pace of Our Lady of Sorrows. It is from this point where the tradition of the parrot poachers begins.

The general Obando and Sarria to escape. The next day the governor Castrillon gave the order for the freighters carry the face uncovered, a custom that continues to this day, like the word "pigeon" used to load the steps a few blocks to the entrance and exit each parade.

On Palm Sunday he left the picture of Mr. Trump, this was sitting on ass, procession started from the temple of the company and toured the center city. url = http | until 1857

With the civil war of 1876 some families fleeing from Popayán to Ecuador. At this time it was thought that the processions definitely would end, as was the case since this event the procession of Easter Monday ends, but by the intervention of small groups of religious people the processions managed to resurface.

In the 19th century during independence from Colombia development decreases in processions due to war because most of the money was used for the liberation cause.

=== 20th century ===
For the 20th century the same thing happened for the economic crisis that Colombia lived. In 1937 the Master Guillermo Valencia, decided to form a Civic Council to take care to preserve that tradition and 1939 said board received official recognition by the ordinance No. 14 issued by the Assembly of Cauca. The new body was given the name of 'Board Permanent Pro Easter Popayán'

In one of the nights of Easter, referring to sahumadoras from one of the balconies of the city the Chilean poet Julio Barrenechea told Jorge Enrique Velasco:

Look, there comes a poem of mine: "she takes up the tray with the fire between camellias and the fire glows and eyes, face Black And going walked still perfuming the sidewalks while... the town looks after crying candles"

Some rains forced to suspend the processions. On Holy Thursday, March 31, 1938, when it was not possible to draw the procession the next day marched three extra steps after having had to intervene Guillermo Valencia to achieve because freighters desire to not endured load that year.

In the Easter of 1964 it rained for three days from Tuesday to Thursday and no procession managed to completely finish its route, cargo ships managed by the Board and the Archdiocese of Popayán in compensation authorize take 22 steps the Friday instead of 12 who were scheduled, so it was necessary to use 176 freighters.

Some steps have fallen by breaking any of the bars as in the case of "judgment" of Maundy Thursday in 1940 in the street trade and "logos" against the Popayán Teatro Friday of 1949, to break the bar of the front right corner.

On 22 March 1951 Mr. Don Arcesius Velasco Iragorri "The Cripple" died in front of the Church of San José the Holy Wednesday loading the passage of "The Taking "on the right front. This is one of the heaviest steps for its size and proportions of images. Since 1952 the passage of "The Arrest" to reach the Church of San Jose, pays homage to its freighter deceased is called "The Touch" where family members give continuity to the legacy of "Lad", and friends say the step on his shoulders for a minute, commemorating the fact fateful March 22.

=== 21st century ===
In recent years the processions have been enriched with new floats, such as Jesus' encounter with the women on the street of bitterness, Mr. Expiration, The Descent, The transfer of Christ to the tomb, our lady virgin Easter, our lord Jesus Christ resurrected, among other images made by Spanish and Ecuadorian imaginary.

From 21 February to 3 April 2003 the National Museum of Colombia presented in its temporary exhibition hall and alternates hall, an exhibition called "Holy Week in Popayán. The procession goes inside" made up of floats, gold and silver ornaments, pictures, litter and textiles, becoming the first out processions outside Popayan

== Ceremonies and processions ==
Processions of Holy Week opens with the processional cross or high cross, which is often accompanied by the acolyte s with them bell or in the case of Good Friday the noisemaker. These are followed by the gang war of National Police of Colombia, then follow the steps, headed by the passage of St. John Evangelist (Tuesday Holy Thursday), death (Good Friday), the paschal candle (Holy Saturday) and ending every night with painful (Tuesday to Friday) and the holy Sabbath with our lord Jesus Christ resurrected. The last step is preceded by the pastor of each temple where part of the procession. The band of musicians Infantry Battalion No. VII "José Hilario López" and the rifle company battalion No. VII "José Hilario López" of National Army of Colombia are the last in parading behind the last step. In the intermediate steps also involved the band of musicians Colombian Air Force, the chamber orchestra of Permanent Board Pro Easter Popayán and the choirs of the Choral Society Obrero -coral Pabon and the Universidad del Cauca interpreting different miserere s songs of the Christian liturgy. Every night parading different steps with different images as each procession of different temples,

=== Thursday of pregón ===
On Thursday before Good Friday in the church of Santo Domingo after the Eucharist, the cry is done, act which is given to all events held during holy week in Popayan, act in which the whole community of Popayan and visitors participate. The opening speech is directed by a member of the Board Permanent Pro Easter Popayán selected previously called crier.

=== Good Friday ===
This procession begins and ends at the Church of St. Augustine. The president of the youth group Pro Easter Permanent board of Popayán and other members are the ones who carry the standard of the permanent board pro Easter. the steps are:

- High Cross
- Police band Cauca
- St. John the Evangelist (Spanish image. 18th century)
- The Lord of the garden "(20th century image for Ascensió José Lamiel)"
- Blows "(Mr. and Jewish carvings quiteñas eighteenth century)"
- The Coronation "(Spanish images eighteenth century)"
- Standard permanent board pro week

St.

- Master Jesus "(the eighteenth century Spanish master image, Cyrene and carving century Jewish quiteña

XVIII) "

- The crucifix (Spanish image. 18th century) Silver Cross goldsmith payanesa
- Pastor
- Our Lady of Sorrows (Spanish image. 18th century)
- Band of musicians José Hilario López Battalion

=== Saturday before Palm Sunday ===
This day is usually chosen for cleaning, armed, and mounted the images on the steps parade during Holy Week, in every temple where they leave the processions trustees and freighters who are responsible for this task together. On this day the litter arm themselves and their images are mounted, but not their ornaments or wreaths but only put up the day procesionan these steps. In itself this day most of trustees made the cotejas to balance the weight of the step in the respective freighters. The steps remain exposed in churches until the day of procession later this will be disarmed until next Easter.

=== Palm Sunday ===
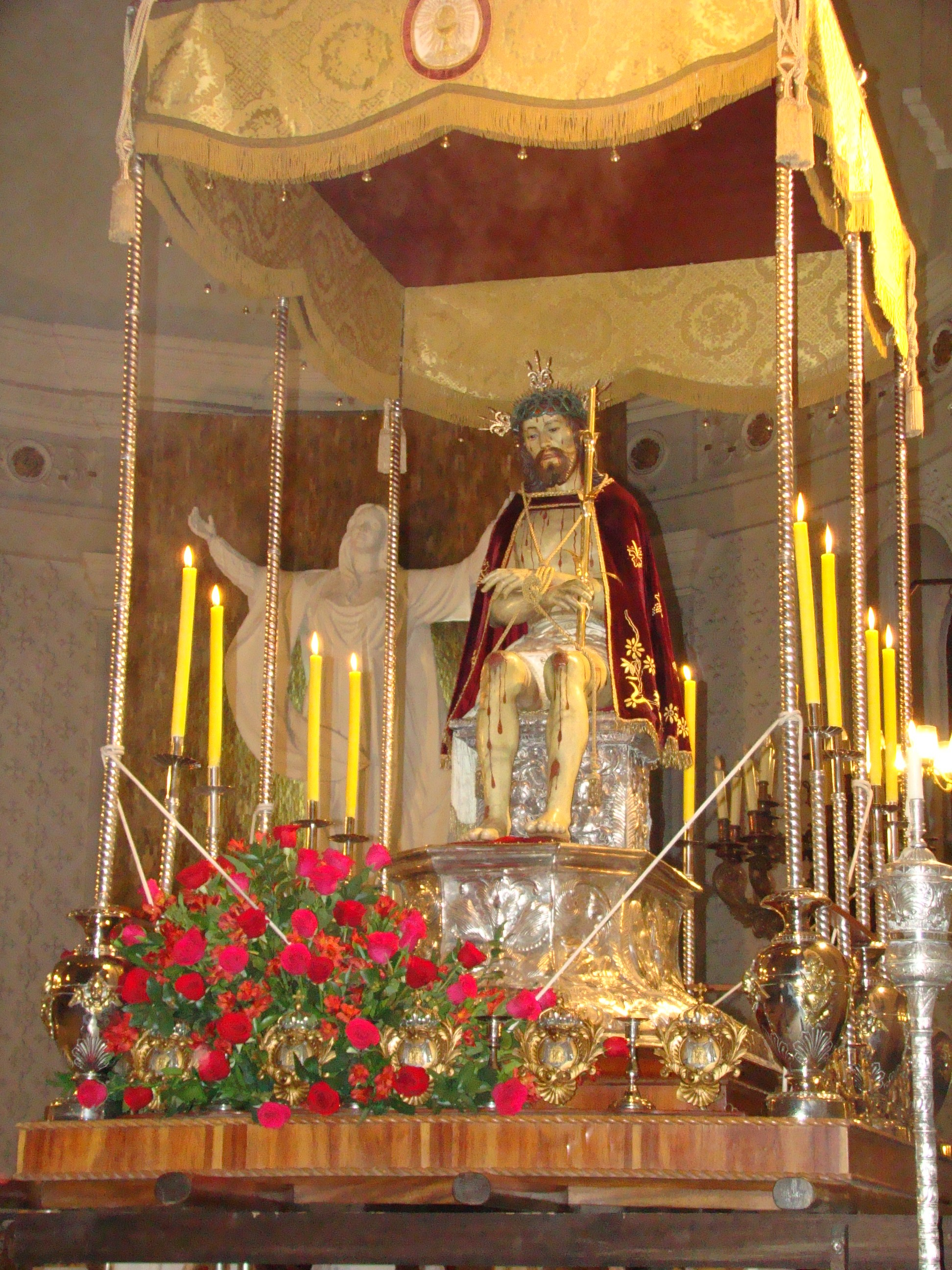
The Holy Ecce homo parades during processions on Palm Sunday, Tuesday, Wednesday and Thursday santo

Starting from the sanctuary of Bethlehem, the first proper procession of Easter payanesa, down by "quingos", to the city and goes to the Cathedral Basilica of Our Lady of the Assumption of Popayán, where he concludes.

Instead of candles, clergy, communities, congregations, religious associations and the Christian people of Popayan porta palms blessed in all the temples of the city, to symbolize the triumphal entry of Jesus into Jerusalem. To solemnize their parade also attend the bishop, the board pro Easter and the liquidator in the step Master who carries the Ecce Homo standard of the board and members of the order Alcayata. The steps are: Order the parade:

- High Cross
- Police Band Cauca
- Mr. fallen (Mr. payanesa image. 18th century and Angel Quito image. 18th century)
- Banner permanent board pro Easter
- Archbishop of Popayán
- El Santo Ecce Homo (replica payanesa of José Lamiel of the twentieth century is Quiteño. The original seventeenth century.)
- Band musicians José Hilario López Battalion

=== Easter Monday ===
In the Cathedral Basilica of Our Lady of the Assumption of Popayán and after the Mass celebrated by the Archbishop of Popayan, and the pro-junta Easter impose the decoration of the Alcayata gold who "have behaved proudly on his shoulders the images of their devotion "and deliver the Cross of alderman and commendations to people who have contributed to the conservation and beautification tradición.

=== Easter Tuesday ===
Procession 'Our lady Dolores', starts and ends at the church of St. Augustine. The Lord Mayor of the city, its secretaries and council members carry the standard of the permanent board pro Easter. the steps are: Order the parade:

- High Cross
- Band peace policia del cauca
- St. John the Evangelist (Spanish image. 18th century)
- The Magdalena (Spanish image. 18th century)
- Veronica (Spanish image. 18th Century)
- The Lord of the Garden (Spanish image. Twentieth century)
- Worker-coral orfeón pabon
- The Taking (quiteñas images. 18th century)
- Denial (quiteñas images. 18th century)
- Blows - (The Lord of the Column (named 1857)) (quiteñas images. 18th century)
- Mr. fallen (Mr. payanesa image. 18th Century and Angel Quito image. 18th century)
- Permanent seal chamber orchestra pro Easter
- El Santo Ecce Homo (replica payanesa of José Lamiel of the twentieth century is Quiteño The original seventeenth century.)
- The meeting of Jesus with women in the street of bitterness (The image of Jesus was developed in Ibarra.. 21st Century The Virgin and Santa Marta are quiteñas origin of the eighteenth century )
- Master Jesus - (The Lord of the Cross (named 1857)) (Spanish images. 18th century)
- The Lord of forgiveness (Spanish image. 18th century) (the world is in law silver 900 with gold shield of Popayan)
- Band of musicians Colombian Air Force

== Simultaneous events during Holy Week ==
During Holy Week or Easter Week the city is also home to the Religious Music Festival, which began in 1960 as an initiative of Edmundo Troya Mosquera. After his death, it is administered by his widow Stella Dupont Arias and his children Juan Manuel and Ana Isabel Mosquera Dupont. It involves choirs, soloists and artists from around the world, and it is specialized in sacred music. It also carries out national sample Golden Hands craft, which exhibits the work of artists in the country.

== See also ==
- Popayán
- Holy Week
- UNESCO Intangible Cultural Heritage Lists
- Capirote
