= Holy Week procession =

Processions held in Christian countries to celebrate the Holy Week

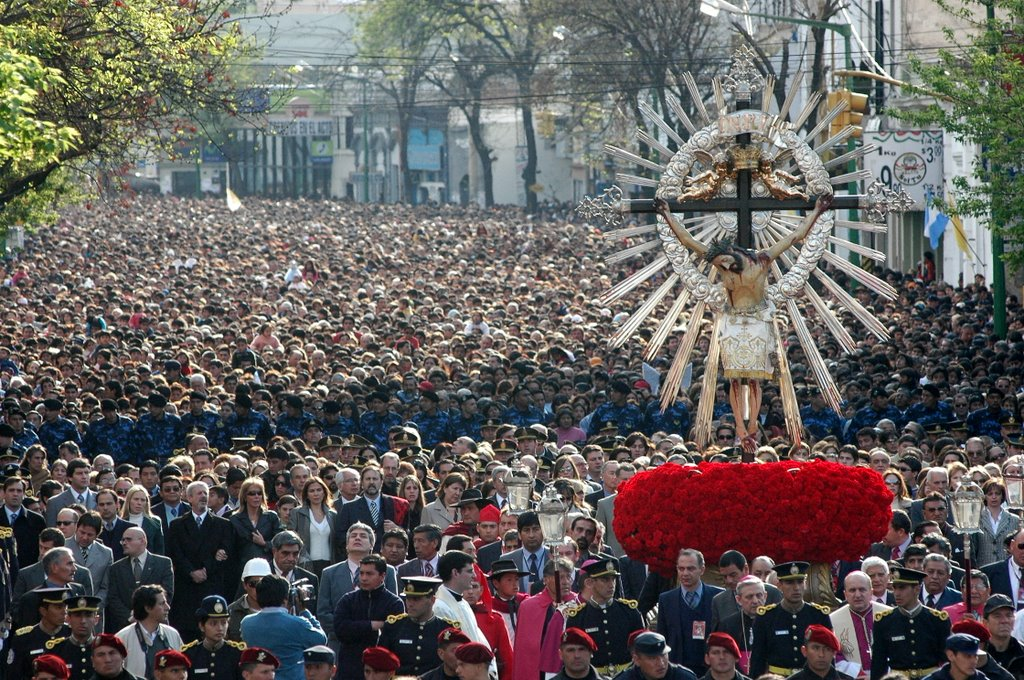
Procession of Our Lord of the Miracle in Salta city.

A Holy Week procession is a public ritual march of clergy and penitents which takes place during Holy Week in Christian countries, especially those with a Catholic culture. Various images of the saints, especially the Virgin Mary, and most importantly the image of the crucified Christ are carried aloft by foot on shoulder-borne pasos (or on wheeled carrozas in the Philippines) as an act of penance; acts of mortification are carried out; traditional Christian hymns and chants are sung (except during the silent processions of Good Friday). In many confraternities of penitents, the faces of the members are covered by elaborate hoods, such as the capirote, as a way of hiding one's identity in order to not ostentatiously draw attention to oneself while performing penance. Crosses, and biers holding Catholic holy images surrounded with flowers and offerings of candles, are carried usually from one parish church to another led by the clergy, monastic orders, or heads of the penitential orders.

== Holy Week processions ==
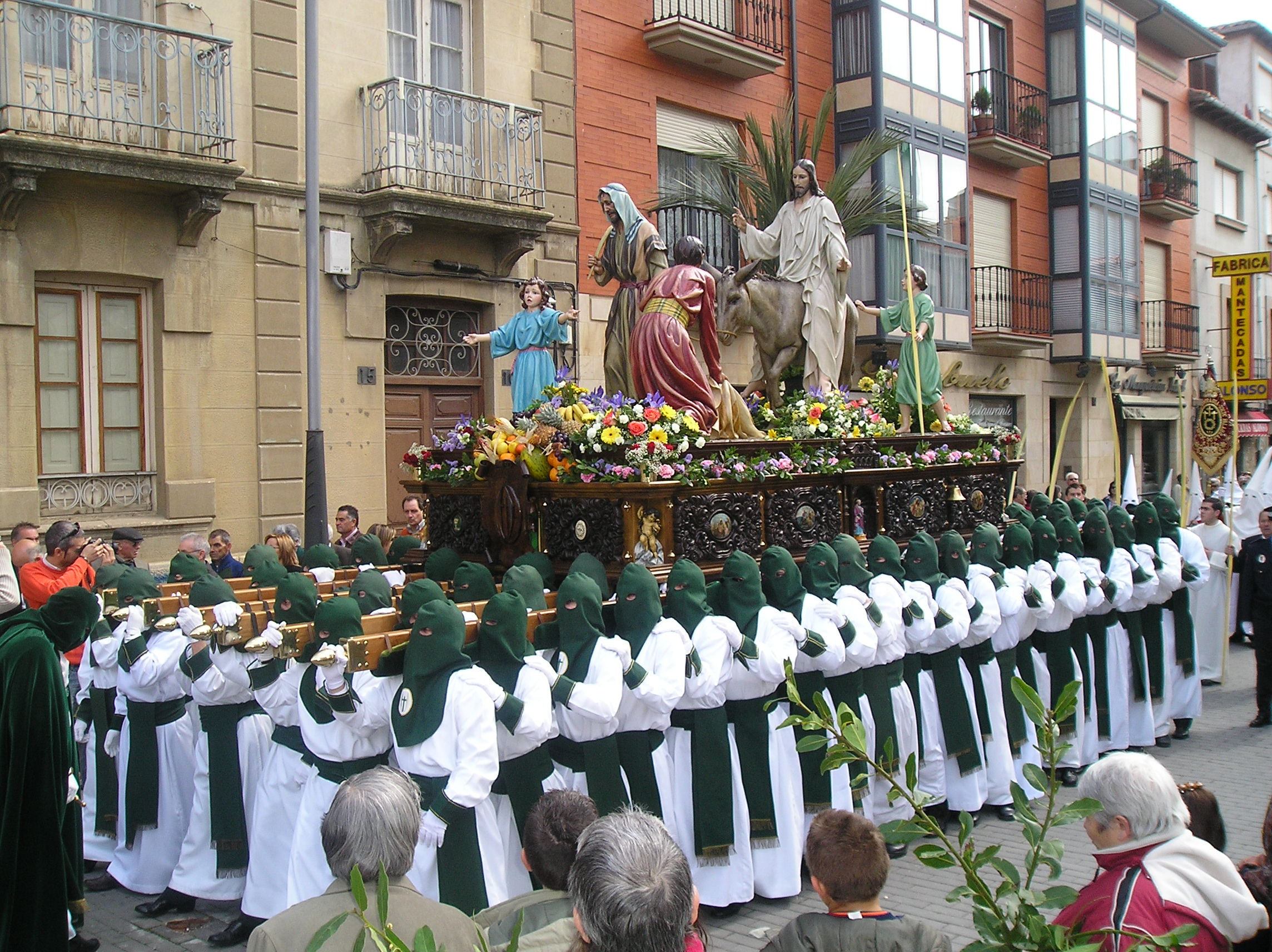
Palm Sunday procession in Astorga (Spain)

- Palm Sunday: The day when Jesus arrived in Jerusalem.
- Holy Thursday: The day when Jesus shared the Last Supper with His Apostles, followed by the beginning of his Passion.
- Good Friday: Jesus' crucifixion, performed in 14 stations.
- Holy Saturday: Loneliness of the Blessed Virgin Mary and the day that Jesus Christ's body lay in the tomb.
- Easter Sunday: The resurrection of the Christ.

== Spanish Speaking cultures ==
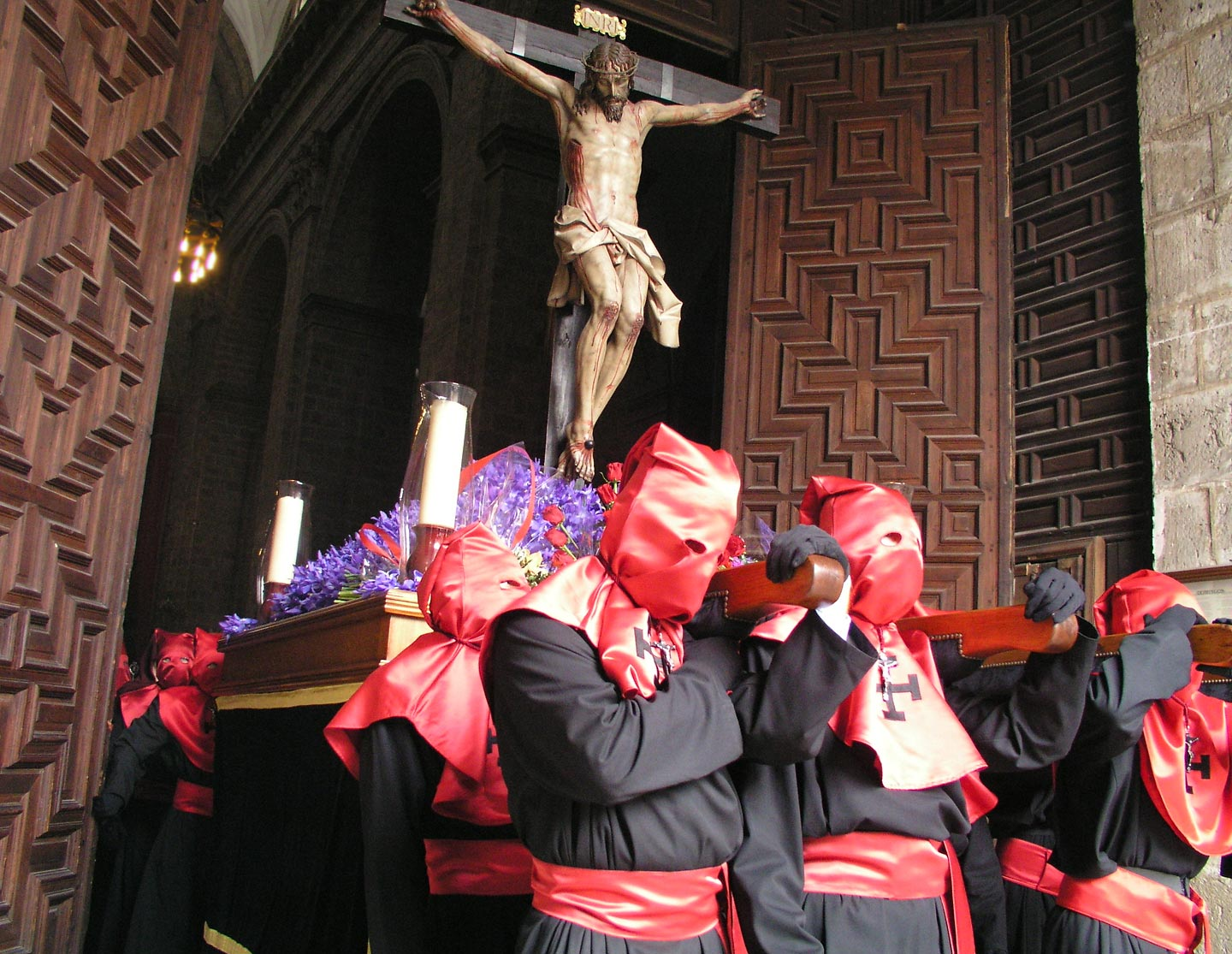
Holy Week procession in Valladolid (Spain)

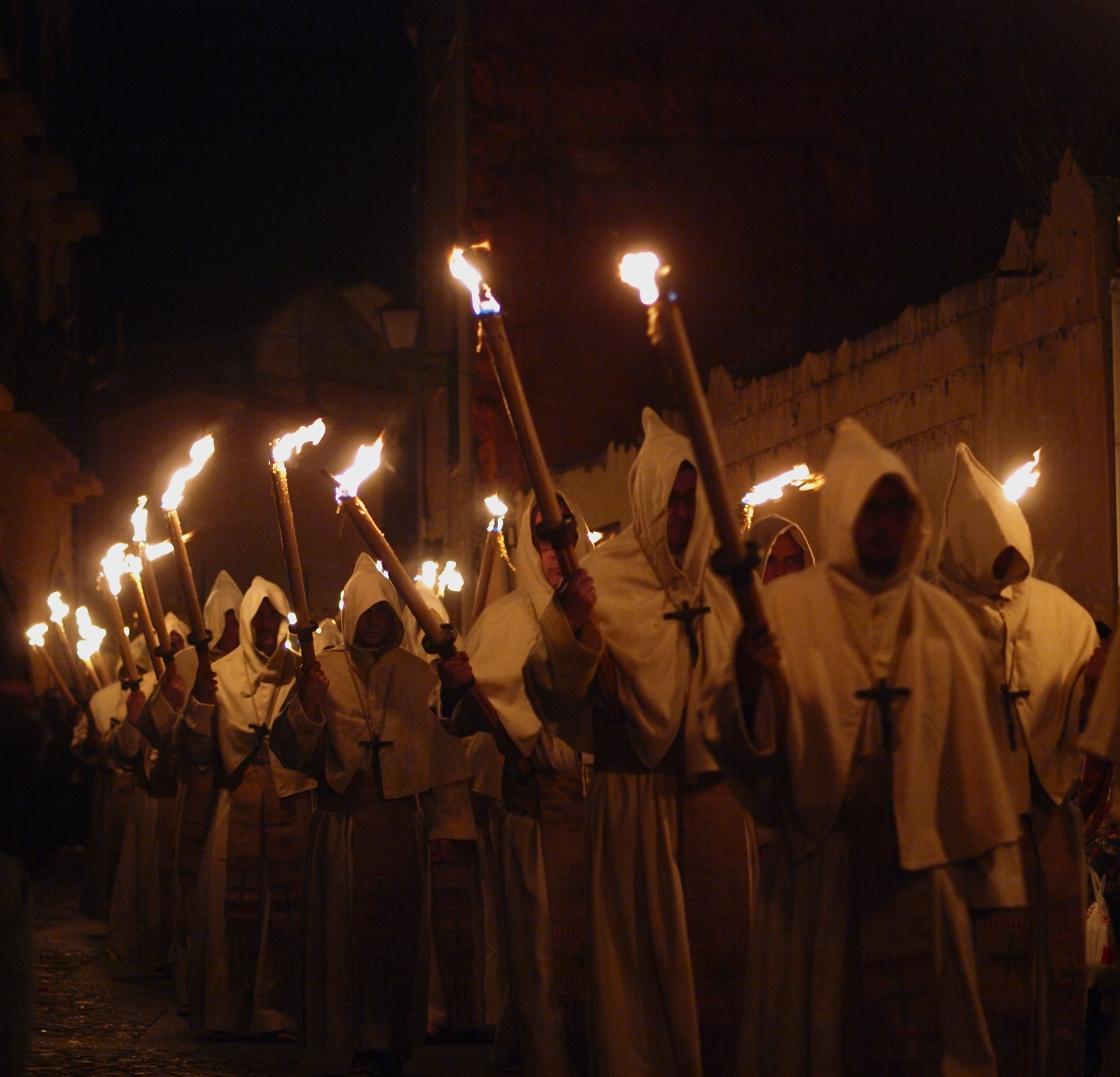
Holy Week in Zamora

In Spain, Semana Santa processions are among the most elaborate and culturally significant in the world. These events, rooted in medieval and Baroque traditions, are organized by Catholic brotherhoods (cofradías) that carry ornate floats (pasos) through the streets, depicting scenes from the Passion of Christ and the Sorrows of the Virgin Mary. Participants often wear penitential robes and conical hoods (capirotes), walk barefoot, or carry wooden crosses as acts of penance. While southern cities like Seville, Málaga, and Jerez de la Frontera are known for their dramatic and vibrant processions, northern regions such as Zamora, León, and Valladolid feature more austere and solemn commemorations. These processions combine religious devotion, public spectacle, art, music, and local identity, and many have been declared Festivals of International Tourist Interest by the Spanish government.

In many Spanish-speaking countries of Latin America, Semana Santa processions are among the most important religious and cultural events of the year. These processions, introduced during the Spanish colonial period, often mirror the structure and aesthetics of Spanish Semana Santa while incorporating local traditions and artistic expressions. In Mexico Spanish colonial traditions are often combined with indigenous influences, resulting in highly localized and varied observances. Cities like Iztapalapa, Taxco, and San Luis Potosí host elaborate passion plays and processions, with some involving thousands of participants reenacting the final days of Jesus's life, while rural and Indigenous communities incorporate unique regional customs. Guatemala also has elaborate processions during Holy Week which have drawn comparisons to Maya practices and survived despite some severe challenge from various anti-clerical regimes.

The Philippines which was under Spanish control until 1898 shows a marked Spanish heritage, and the time is still known as Semana Santa. Other areas such as Trapani in Sicily, have shown Spanish influence due to their time under Spanish control.

== Non Spanish Speaking cultures ==
=== Malta ===
Maltese Holy Week processions have a number of influences, with a guild linked to Franciscan friars in Rabat being the first to organise a procession in Malta. Malta's inclusion up to 1807 in the diocese of Palermo meant that there were strong influences from Sicily that in itself had influences from both Genoa and Spain. Participants in Holy Week processions often dress in elaborate biblical or Roman costumes, while in some towns, penitents walk with chains around their ankles in an echo of a medieval devotional practice. Easter Sunday is marked by celebratory processions featuring statues of the Risen Christ, often carried at a run through the streets by local youths to symbolize joy and victory over death.

=== Mainland France ===
- Sanch Procession

=== Corsica ===
- Calvi, Sartène (See Catenacciu )

=== Italy ===
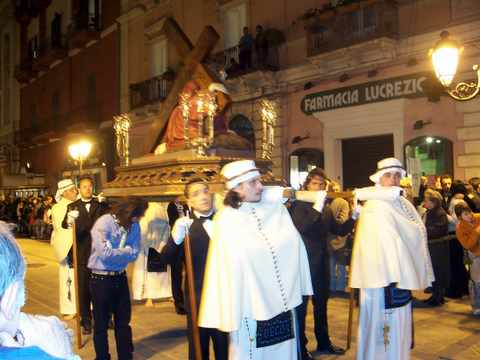
Holy Week procession in Taranto (Italy)

Trapani, Taranto, Chieti, Sulmona, Barcellona Pozzo di Gotto

== See also ==
- Triduum
