= Cathedral Basilica of Our Lady of the Assumption, Popayán =

Coordinates: 2.4414°N 76.6065°W

Cathedral Basilica of Our Lady of the Assumption
- Catedral Basílica de Nuestra Señora de la Asunción
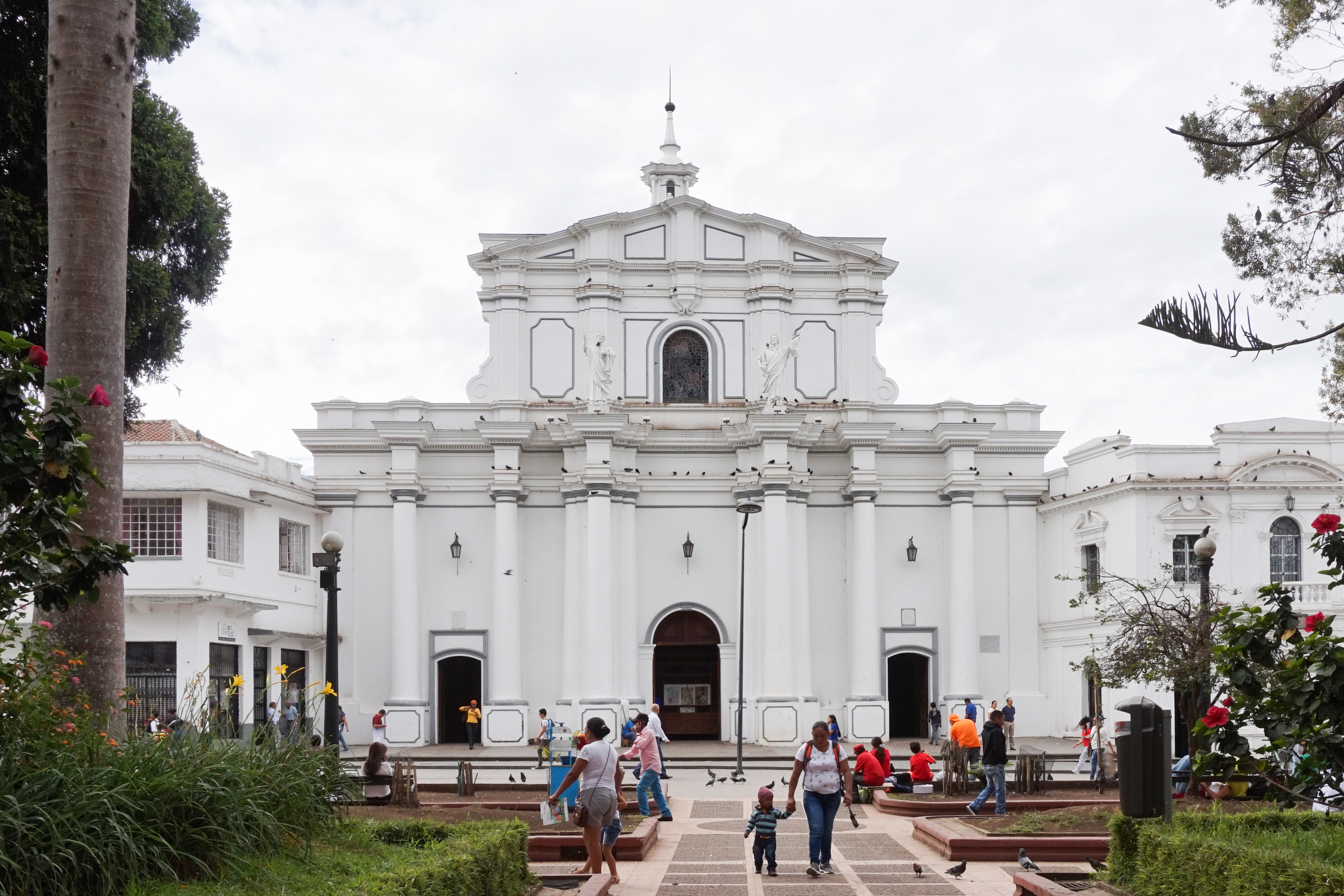
- Cathedral Basilica of Our Lady of the Assumption
- Location: Popayán
- Country: Colombia
- Denomination: Roman Catholic Church

The Cathedral Basilica of Our Lady of the Assumption (Spanish: Catedral Basílica de Nuestra Señora de la Asunción) also called Popayán Cathedral It is a Catholic cathedral dedicated to the Virgin Mary under the title of Our Lady of the Assumption of Popayán.

== Description ==
The building is located on the west side of Caldas Park in the historic center of the city of Popayán (Cauca) in the South American country of Colombia. It is Metropolitan Cathedral and Basilica minor. It is the cathedral of the Archdiocese of Popayan, seat of the Archbishop and Metropolitan Chapter.

In 1546, it was established the Diocese of Popayan by Pope Paul III in the Bull "Super speculates Militantis Ecclesiae" of September 1 of that year. He was appointed as the first Bishop Juan del Valle, a native of Segovia (Spain).

The cathedral was, like all the buildings of Popayan, stripped of her immense artistic wealth by Antonio Nariño. On 12 December 1909 an organ premiered sent from Paris, and until then, one of the best brought to South America. In 1953, the cathedral was restored, and on April 25 of that year, Pope Pius XII granted the cathedral the liturgical title of Basilica Menor. In addition, the historic area of Popayan (including the cathedral), was declared Colombia National monument by Law 163 of December 30, 1959.

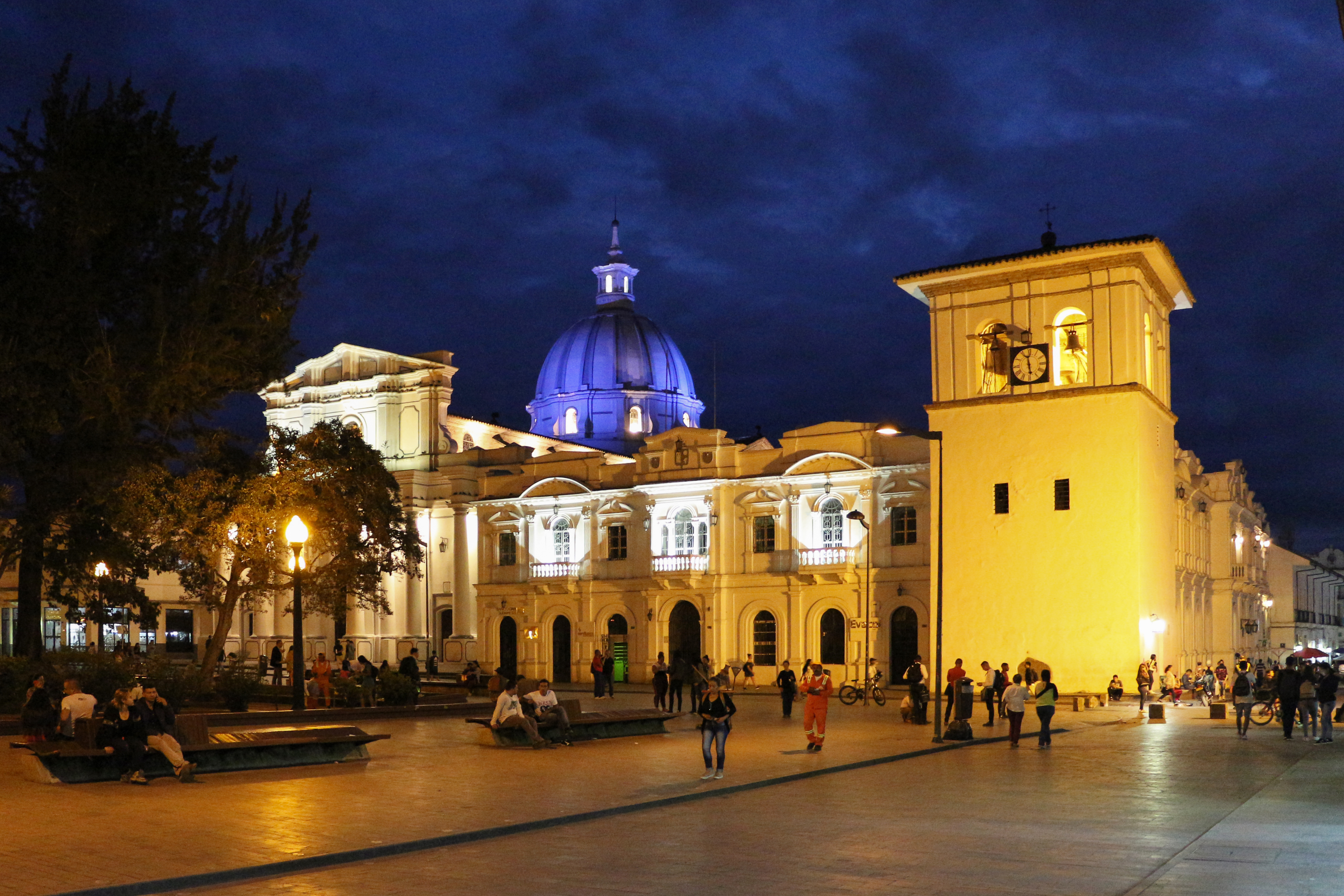
At night

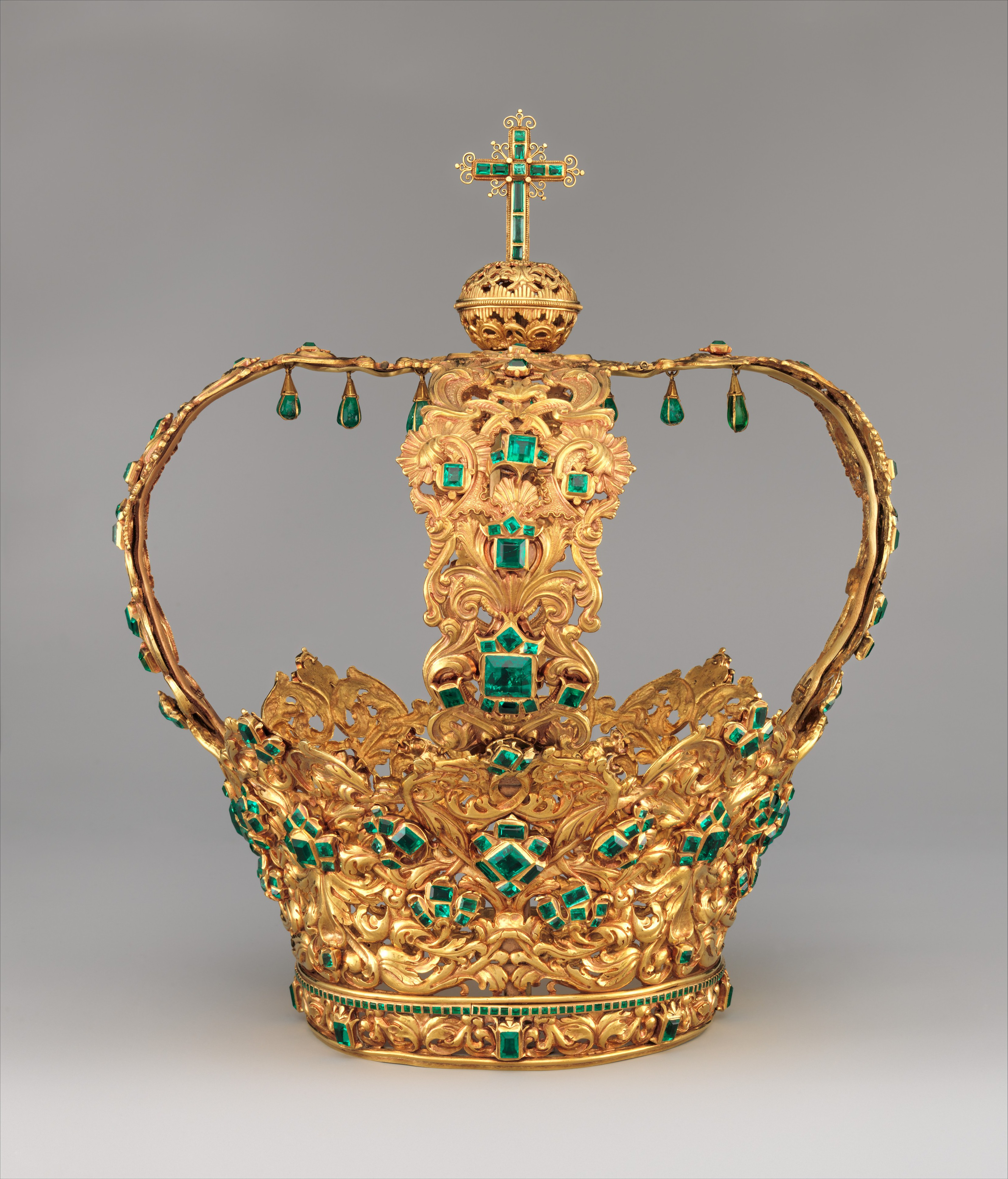
Crown of the Andes, ca. 1660-1770, made for a larger than life-size statue of the Virgin Mary in the Cathedral of Popayán, Colombia. Now is at the Metropolitan Museum of Art

== See also ==
- Roman Catholicism in Colombia
- Our Lady of the Assumption
