= Nazareno (Spanish confraternity) =

Member of confraternity

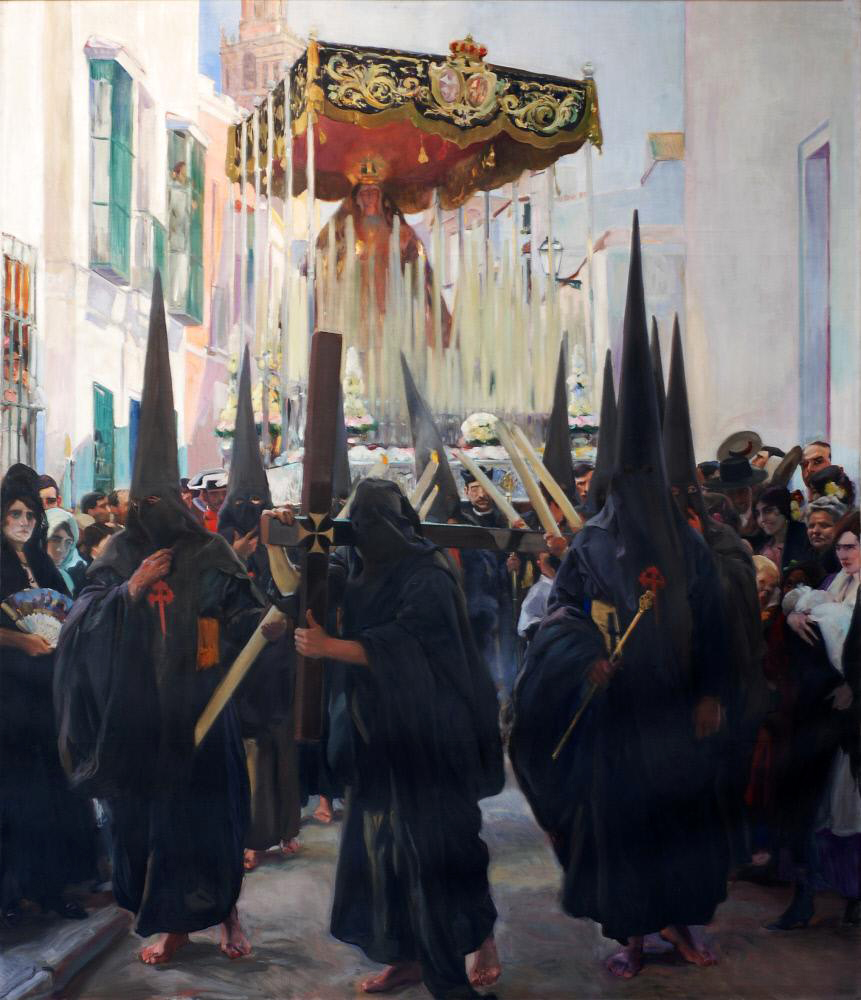
Sevilla. Los nazarenos, by Joaquín Sorolla (1914).

A nazareno (nazarene) is a member of a brotherhood which performs penance rites during Holy Week in Spain (and in some Latin American countries such as Colombia and Guatemala). They parade wearing the clothing that conforms to the rules of the brotherhood. The most common term in use is Nazarenes, but in some regions they are known as capuchones (hoodies), or mozorros (lads) or some variation of implying “worthy of punishment”.

== Thrones ==
Teams of several dozen lightly clad members will be hidden beneath drapery of a heavy platform (typically 1 – 5 tonnes) bearing an enthroned and splendid icons that are the centrepiece of most parades, as demonstrated in the photo.

Injuries affect some 10% of bearers. The most common injuries derived from the effort of carrying a throne at Easter are reportedly "shoulder or ankle tendinitis, muscle tears, frozen shoulder or ligament damage".

== Nomenclature ==
The name "Nazarene" derives from the town of Galilee, where Jesus spent most of his life, according to the Bible. Although Jesus was born in Bethlehem, Judea, and spent a brief period of childhood in Egypt, he soon settled with his father Joseph and his mother Mary in the small town of Nazareth.

It is important in Spanish to differentiate the nazarene (with lowercase letters) from the Nazarene (with an initial capital). The first relates to members of Cofradías and the second is reserved for the contemporary companions of Jesus of Nazareth, especially those that helped him bear his cross during his final humiliation.

== Clothing insignia ==
Since the 16th century there were processions of brothers who carried insignia similar to the current fraternity banners, scrolls and Christian religious symbols They dress in a Thawb secured at the waist by rope belt or a simple girdle, on their heads a pointed Capirote cap made of a leather cone covered in cotton or linen that extends to obscure the face and neck to ensure anonymity. Similar garb was adapted by the Ku Klux Klan in the early 20th century.

== Modernity ==
Modern participants tend to become members of Cofradías by family tradition rather than from devout religious conviction, motivated by masculine pride in being chosen, fit and capable of enduring the rigorous ordeal of a prolonged street theater performance.

Recently (from about 2024) women have been admitted to some Cofradías on the basis that Mary, Mother of Jesus and Mary Magdalene were recorded as present at the crucifixion and were presumably loyal devotees of Christ

== Popular culture ==
The video game Blasphemous depicts a nazareno as the main character and received "generally favorable" ratings, the Metacritic web reviewer covering several gaming platforms.

== See also ==
- Confraternity of penitents
- Black Nazarene
