= José Lamiel =

Spanish sculptor and painter

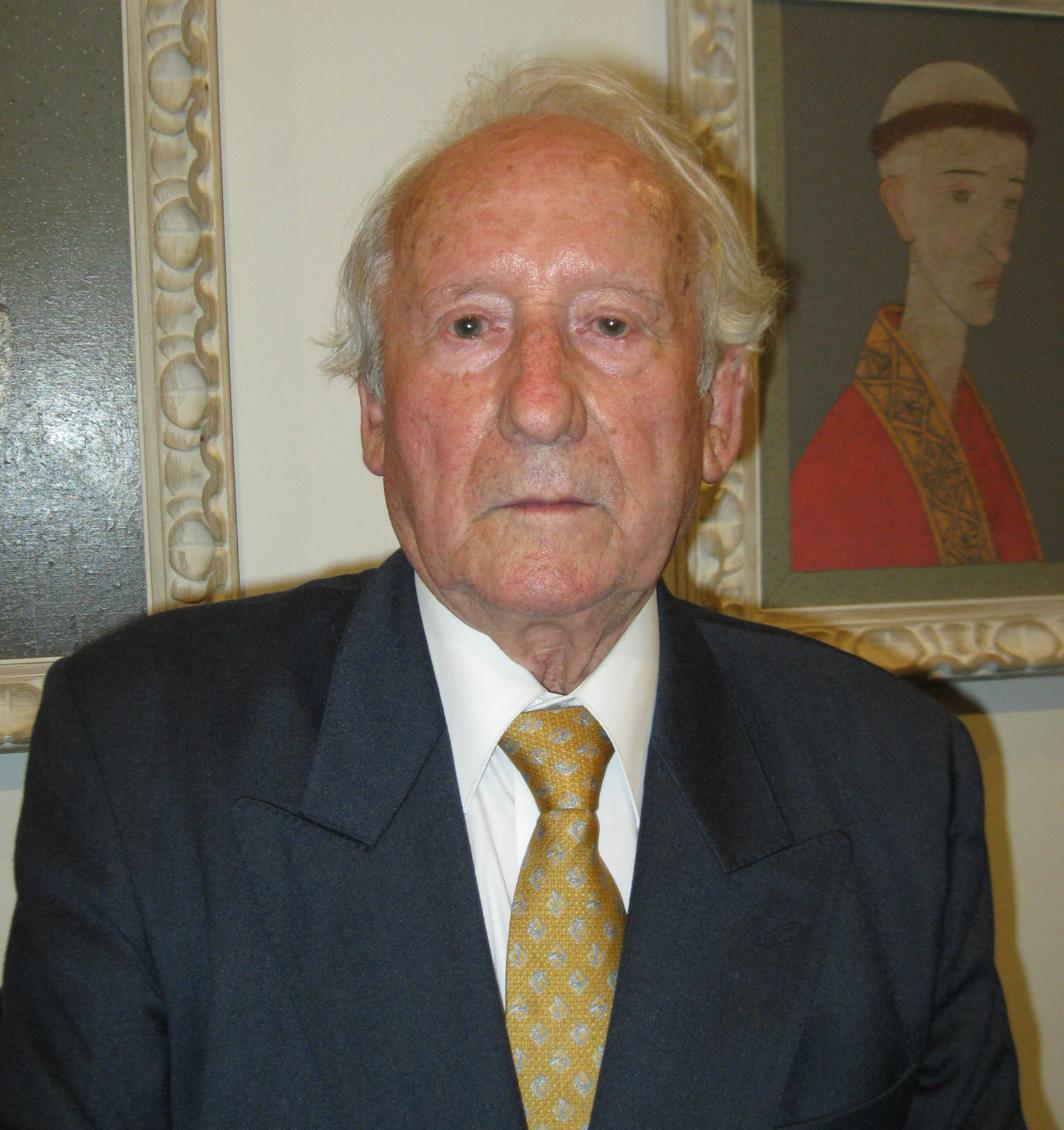

Personal details
- Born: 29 January 1924 Calanda, Teruel Province, Spain
- Died: 26 August 2020 (aged 96) Alcalá de Henares, Community of Madrid, Spain
- Resting place: Alcalá de Henares, Community of Madrid, Spain
- Profession: Painter, sculptor

José Asensio Lamiel (29 January 1924 – 26 August 2020) was an Aragonese painter and sculptor born in Calanda in the Spanish comarca of Bajo Aragón.

== Biography ==
He began his studies at the School of Applied Arts and Crafts in Zaragoza. A scholarship allowed him to study at the San Carlos Royal Academy of Fine Arts in Valencia, and then at the San Fernando Royal Academy of Fine Arts in Madrid. In the 1960s he moved to Colombia and worked there for six years; he also worked in the United States, before returning to Spain, where he set up residence in Madrid, and continued to develop as painter and sculptor. In 1989 he was awarded the Cruz de San Jorge by the provincial government of Teruel.

== Gallery ==
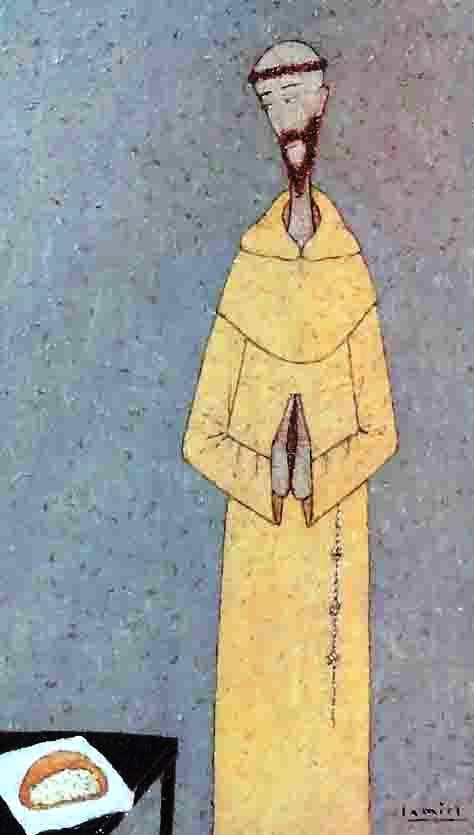
Monje.

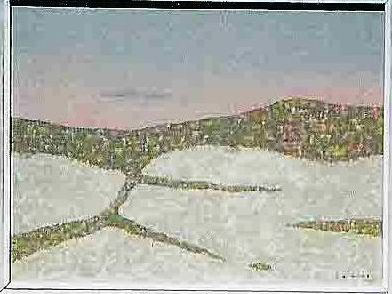
Paisaje del Bajo Aragón.

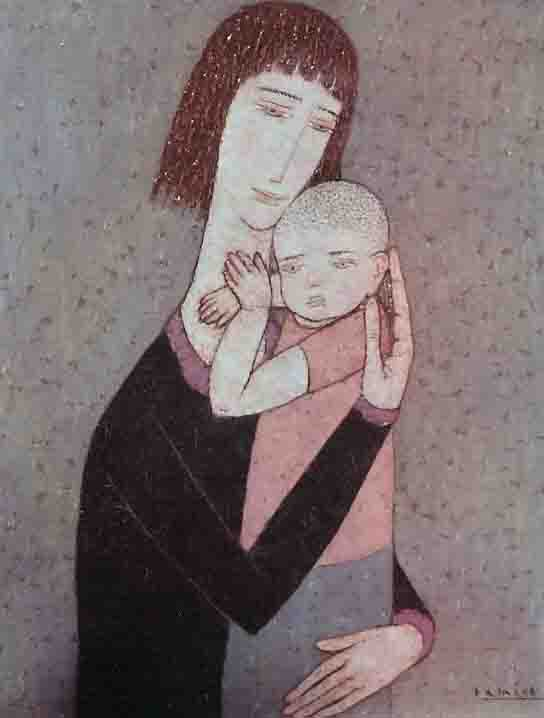
Maternidad.

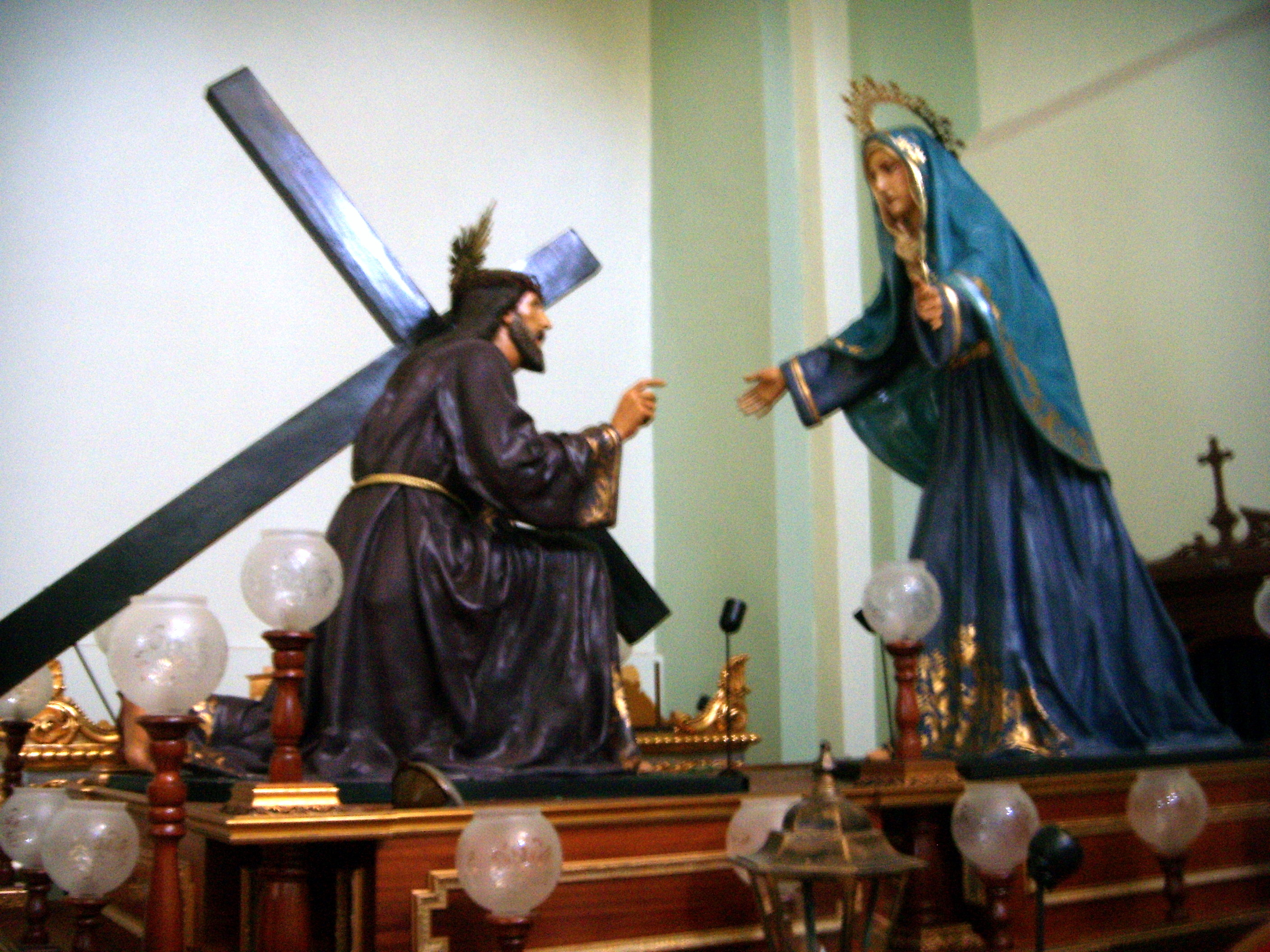
El Encuentro.

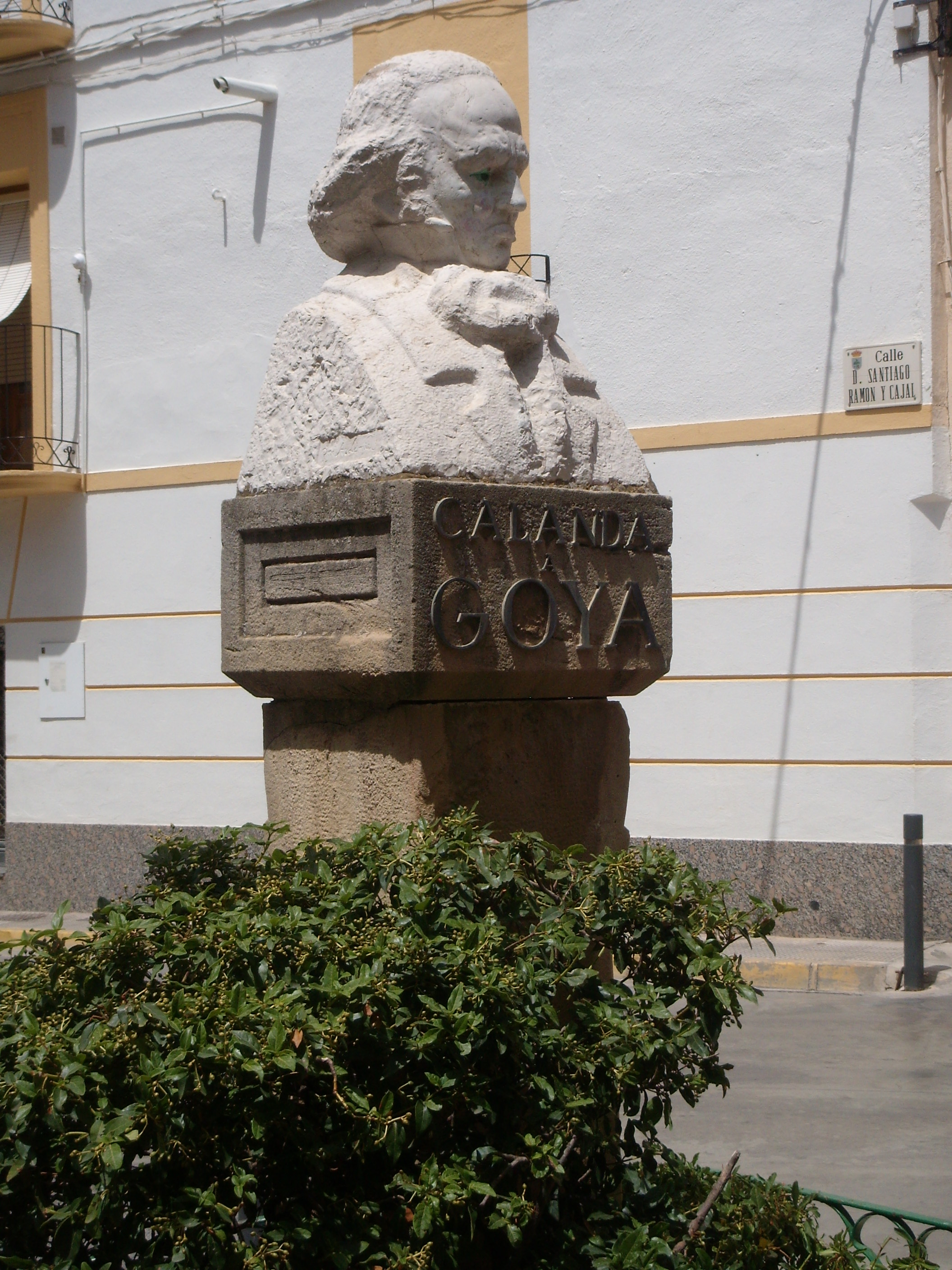
Calanda a Goya (1950).

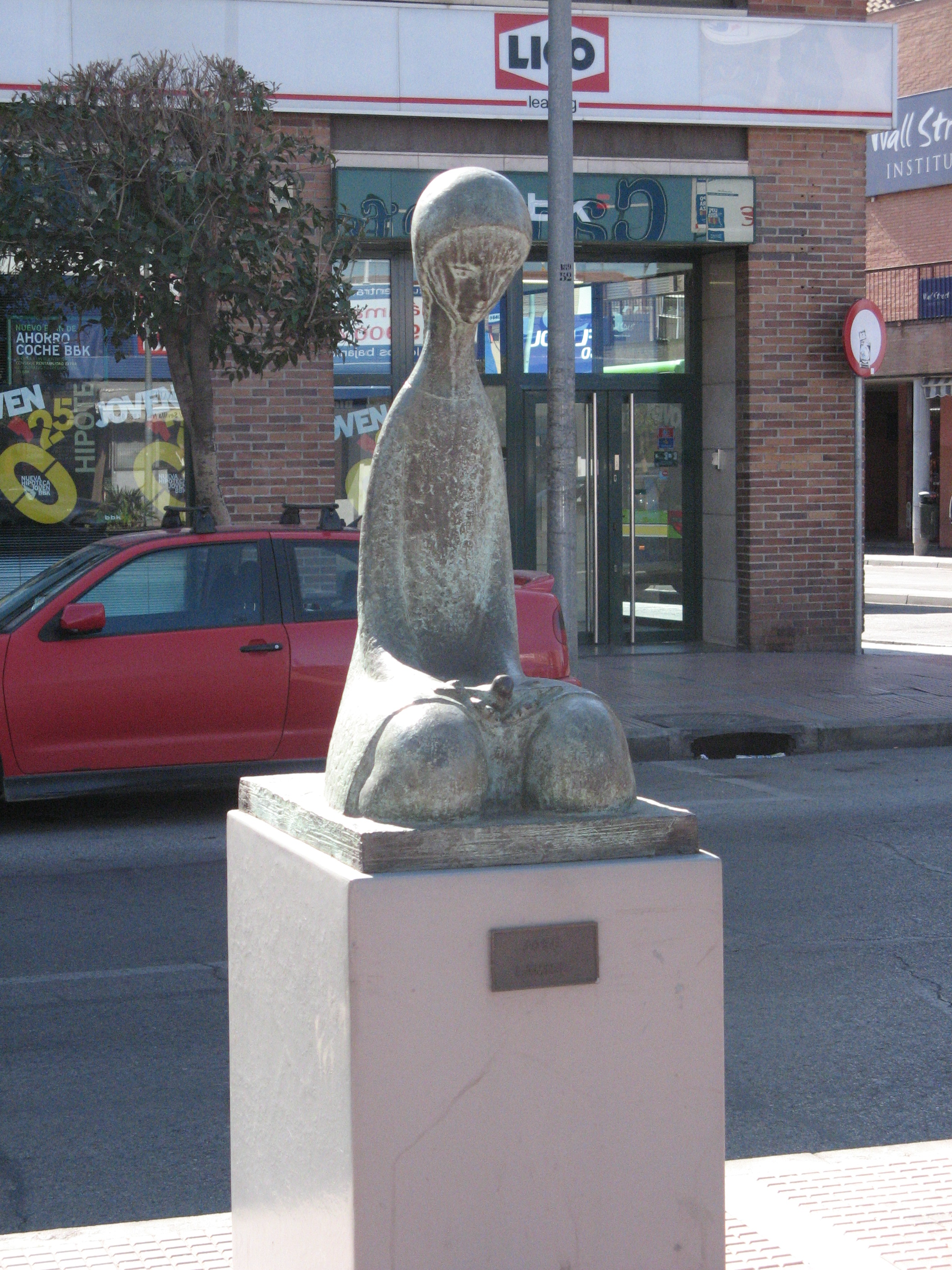

== Bibliography ==
- Diccionario Antológico de Artistas Aragoneses 1947–1978, Institución Fernando el Católico, Zaragoza, 1983.

== See also ==
- Museo de Escultura al Aire Libre de Alcalá de Henares
