= Sanch Procession =

Annual ceremony in French Catalonia

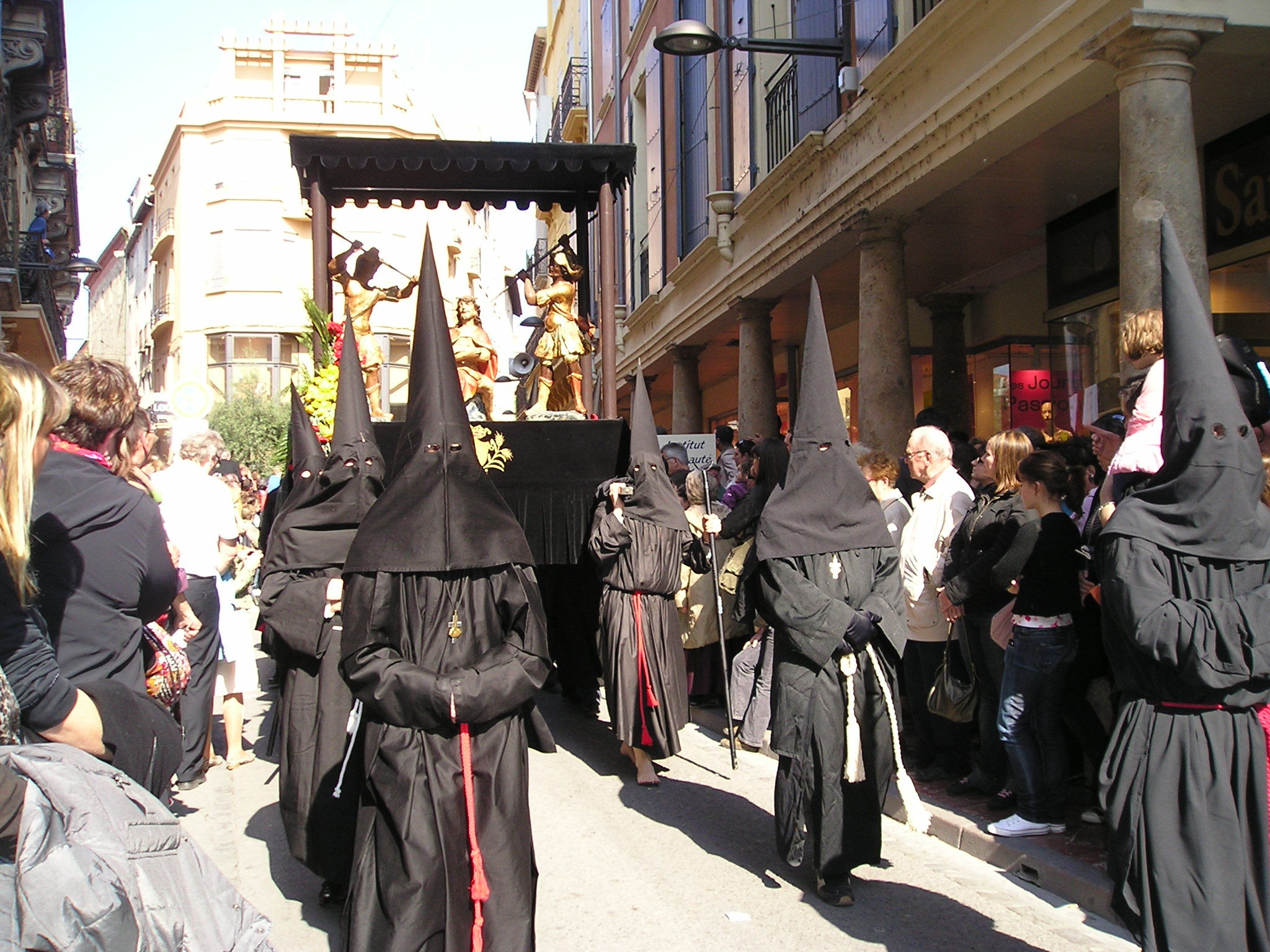
The famous "Sanch Procession" folklore celebrated in Perpignan, Arles-sur-Tech and Collioure.

The Procession de la Sanch (Processó de la Sanch in Catalan) is an annual ceremony in several towns in French Catalonia. It is held during Holy Week on Good Friday ('Vendredi Saint'/'Divendres Sant'). Historically, a distinctive peaked, masked robe (the capirote) was used to protect the identity of prisoners (from revenge by those wronged) being led to their town's annual execution. This practical ceremony intermingled with Christian traditions of Good Friday, and today a long procession of black-robed people are led in silence by the red-robed regidor to the solemn tapping of a tambourine, as part of the Good Friday celebrations.
