= Victim soul =

Christian concept regarding suffering

In Christianity, a victim soul is an unofficial belief derived from interpretations of the Catholic Church's teachings on redemptive suffering. A person believes themselves, or is considered by others, to have been chosen by God to suffer more than most, accepting this condition based on the example of the Passion (crucifixion) of Jesus Christ. Neither the Catholic Church, nor any other Christian denomination, considers the concept of victim souls to be dogma, or officially designates anyone a 'victim soul'. As it is not considered dogma, the Catholic Church classifies belief in victim souls as a matter of private revelation, and thus not obligatory for members to subscribe to.

== Background ==
In the apostolic letter Salvifici doloris (1984), which addresses human suffering and redemption, Pope John Paul II noted: "The Redeemer suffered in place of man and for man. Every man has his own share in the Redemption. Each one is also called to share in that suffering through which the Redemption was accomplished."

An exposition of the tradition of victim soul appears in the autobiography of the Carmelite monastic Thérèse of Lisieux, The Story of a Soul. In her personal view, the victim soul is a chosen one whose suffering is mysteriously joined with the redemptive suffering of Christ and is used for the redemption of others.

The Catholic Church does not officially designate anyone as a victim soul. The issue came up when the family of Audrey Santo, an ailing child in a vegetative state, claimed that she had volunteered to be a victim soul. Rev. Daniel P. Reilly, Bishop of Worcester, made clear that the church does not acknowledge such claims. The term comes from the testimony of those who have observed Christians who seem to or purport to undergo redemptive suffering. Victim soul status is a matter of private revelation unlike dogmas; therefore, individual believers are not required to accept, as part of the Catholic faith, the legitimacy of any particular person for whom such a claim is made, nor the genuineness of any miraculous claims that have been made in connection with such a person.

== Notable cases ==
Examples of alleged victim souls are:

- Mary of the Divine Heart (1863–1899), the noble countess Droste zu Vischering and Mother Superior of the Convent of Good Shepherd Sisters in Porto, Portugal, wrote in her autobiography "I offered myself to God as a victim for the sanctification of priests" and added "I know that the Lord has accepted my suffering".
- Gemma Galgani (1878 – April 11, 1903) wrote in her autobiography how Jesus told her "I need souls who, by their sufferings, trials and sacrifices, make amends for sinners and for their ingratitude."
- Alexandrina of Balazar (1904–1955), whose Vatican biography states that she saw her vocation in life to invite others to conversion, and to "offer a living witness of Christ's passion, contributing to the redemption of humanity."
- Faustina Kowalska (1905–1938), who wrote in her diary that Christ had chosen her to be a "victim offering", a role that she voluntarily accepted.

Although the notion of a scapegoat has been present within Christian teachings for a long time, the concept of a victim soul is distinct and different, in that in this case the victim soul willingly offers the suffering to God, unlike the unwitting scapegoat scenario.

Journalist Peggy Noonan likened John Paul II to a "victim soul" as his health failed in his final years. However, she views it in a somewhat different context. "He is teaching us something through his pain." This is more akin to philosopher Michael Novak's view of Thérèse of Lisieux and redemptive suffering.

== See also ==
- Our Lady of Seven Dolours
- Pieta
- Ecce Homo
- Reparation to the Immaculate Heart of Mary
- Persecution of Christians
- Redemptive suffering
