= DZU =

DZU or Dzu may refer to

- Dziennik Ustaw
- Dzo
- Ngo Dzu
- Shen Dzu
- Trương Đình Dzu
