= Mortification in Catholic theology =

Roman Catholic doctrine of mortification

The Catholic Church has often held mortification of the flesh (literally, "putting the flesh to death"), as a worthy spiritual discipline. The practice is rooted in the Bible: in the asceticism of the Old and New Testament saints, and in its theology, such as the remark by Saint Paul, in his Epistle to the Romans, where he states: "If you live a life of nature, you are marked out for death; if you mortify the ways of nature through the power of the Spirit, you will have life." (Romans 8:13, DRC). It is intimately connected with Christ's complete sacrifice of himself on the Cross: "those who belong to Christ have crucified nature, with all its passions, all its impulses" (Gal 5:24, DRC). Christ himself enjoined his disciples to mortify themselves when he said: "If any man would come after me, let him deny himself and take up his cross and follow me" (Matt 16:24, DRC).

According to the Catechism of the Catholic Church, "the way of perfection passes by way of the Cross. There is no holiness without renunciation and spiritual battle. Spiritual progress entails the ascesis and mortification that gradually lead to living in the peace and joy of the Beatitudes: 'He who climbs never stops going from beginning to beginning, through beginnings that have no end. He never stops desiring what he already knows.'" The purpose of mortification is to train "the soul to virtuous and holy living". It achieves this through conforming one's passions to reason and faith. According to the Catholic Encyclopedia, internal mortification, such as the struggle against pride and self-love, is essential, but external mortification, such as fasting can also be good if they conform with a spirit of internal mortification.

== Mortification in Catholic history ==
Throughout the Old Testament, persons fast and wear sackcloth to appease God. Furthermore, the nazirites were persons who took special vows to, among other things, abstain from alcohol.

In the New Testament, Saint John the Baptist is the most clear example of a person practising corporal mortification. According to Mark 1:6, "John was clothed with a garment of camel’s hair, and had a leather girdle about his loins, and he ate locusts and wild honey" (DRC).

The rule of St. Augustine of Hippo says: "Subdue your flesh by fasting from meat and drink, so far as your health permits. But if anyone is not able to fast, at least let him take no food out of meal time, unless he is sick."

St. Dominic Loricatus (995–1060) is said to have performed "one hundred years penance" by chanting 20 psalters accompanied by 300,000 lashes over six days.

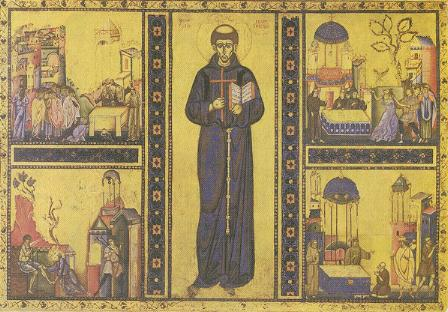
St. Francis: he asked pardon from his "Brother Ass" (as he referred to his body), for his severe penances.

Later, Saint Francis of Assisi, who is said to have received stigmata, painful wounds like those of Jesus Christ, is said to have asked pardon to his body, whom he called "Brother Ass", for the severe self-afflicted penances he has done: vigils, fasts, frequent flagellations and the use of a hairshirt.

A Doctor of the Church, St. Catherine of Siena (died 1380), was a Dominican tertiary who lived in the way of a consecrated virgin and practiced austerities which a prioress would probably not have permitted. She is notable for fasting and subsisting for long periods of time on nothing but the Blessed Sacrament. St. Catherine of Siena wore sackcloth and scourged herself three times daily in imitation of St. Dominic.

In the sixteenth century, Saint Thomas More, the Lord Chancellor of England, wore a hairshirt, deliberately mortifying his body. He also used the discipline.

Saint Ignatius of Loyola while in Manresa in 1522 is known to have practiced severe mortifications. In the Litany prayers to Saint Ignatius he is praised as being "constant in the practice of corporal penance." He was in the habit of wearing a cord tied below the knee.

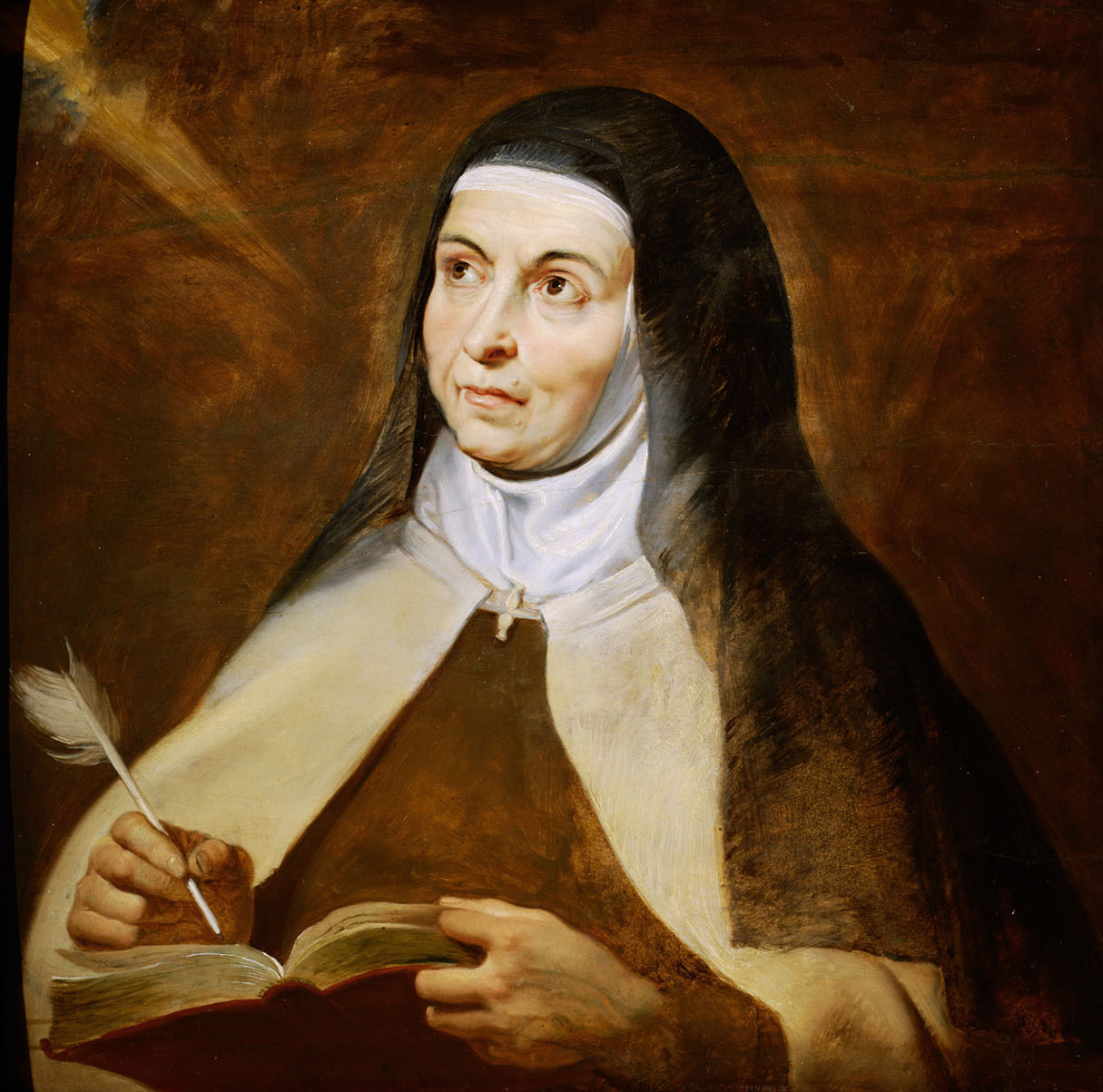
St. Teresa of Ávila: her motto was "Lord, either let me suffer or let me die".

Saint Teresa of Ávila, (1515–1582) a Doctor of the Church, undertook severe mortification once it was suggested by friends that her supernatural ecstasies were of diabolical origin. She continued until Francis Borgia, a Jesuit, reassured her. She believed she was goaded by angels and had a passion to conform her life to the sufferings of Jesus, with a motto associated with her: "Lord, either let me suffer or let me die."

St. Marguerite Marie Alacoque (22 July 1647 October – 17 October 1690), the promoter of the devotion to the Sacred Heart, practised in secret severe corporal mortification after her First Communion at the age of nine, until becoming paralyzed, which confined her to bed for four years. She was eventually cured and she attributed it to the intercession of the Virgin Mary. Afterwards, in honor of her worshiped heavenly host, she changed her name to Mary and vowed to be devoted lifelong to her.

St. Junípero Serra (November 24, 1713 – August 28, 1784), a Franciscan friar who founded the mission chain in Alta California, was known for his love for mortification, self-denial and absolute trust in God.

A notable saint in the nineteenth century was St. Jean Vianney who converted hundreds of people in laicist France. Pope John XXIII said of him: "You cannot begin to speak of St. John Mary Vianney without automatically calling to mind the picture of a priest who was outstanding in a unique way in voluntary affliction of his body; his only motives were the love of God and the desire for the salvation of the souls of his neighbors, and this led him to abstain almost completely from food and from sleep, to carry out the harshest kinds of penances, and to deny himself with great strength of soul... [T]his way of life is particularly successful in bringing many men who have been drawn away by the allurement of error and vice back to the path of good living."

During the later part of the nineteenth century, Saint Therese of the Child Jesus, another Doctor of the Church, at three years of age was described by her mother: "Even Thérèse is anxious to practice mortification." Therese later wrote: "My God, I will not be a saint by halves. I am not afraid of suffering for Thee."

In the early twentieth century, the child seers of Fatima said they had initially seen an angel, who said: "In every way you can offer sacrifice to God in reparation for the sins by which He is offended, and in supplication for sinners. In this way you will bring peace to our country, for I am its guardian angel, the Angel of Portugal. Above all, bear and accept with patience the sufferings God will send you." Lucia Santos later reported that the idea of making sacrifices was repeated several times by the Virgin Mary and that she had shown them a vision of hell which prompted them to ever more stringent self-mortifications to save souls. Among many other practices, Lucia wrote that she and her cousins wore tight cords around their waists, flogged themselves with stinging nettles, gave their lunches to beggars and abstained from drinking water on hot days. Lucia wrote that Mary said God was pleased with their sacrifices and bodily penances.

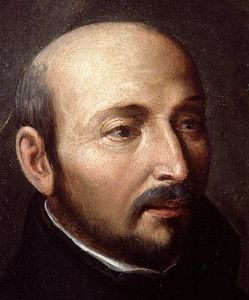
St. Ignatius: he is praised in his litany for being "constant in the practice of corporal penance".

At the latter half of the twentieth century, Saint Josemaría Escrivá practiced self-flagellation and used the cilice, a modern-day version of the hairshirt. Saint Pio of Pietrelcina, a saint who received the stigmata wrote in one of his letters: "Let us now consider what we must do to ensure that the Holy Spirit may dwell in our souls. It can all be summed up in mortification of the flesh with its vices and concupiscences, and in guarding against a selfish spirit ... The mortification must be constant and steady, not intermittent, and it must last for one's whole life. Moreover, the perfect Christian must not be satisfied with a kind of mortification which merely appears to be severe. He must make sure that it hurts." Like St. Josemaria, Padre Pio and Mother Teresa of Calcutta used the cilice and discipline regularly as means of doing penance.

Some branches of Christianity have also institutionalized the practice of self-inflicted penance and corporal mortification through their mandate on fasting and abstinence for specific days of the year. Christian communities in some parts of the world still practice processions of public flagellation during Lent and Holy Week.

== 20th-century Catholic documents ==
Recent theology affirms the practice of mortification. The catechism of the Catholic Church states: "The way of perfection passes by way of the Cross. There is no holiness without renunciation and spiritual battle. Spiritual progress entails the ascesis and mortification that gradually lead to living in the peace and joy of the Beatitudes" (n. 2015).

"Jesus' call to conversion and penance, like that of the prophets before him, does not aim first at outward works, "sackcloth and ashes," fasting and mortification, but at the conversion of the heart, interior conversion. Without this, such penances remain sterile and false; however, interior conversion urges expression in visible signs, gestures and works of penance." (CCC 1430)

Pope John XXIII, who convened the Second Vatican Council, taught in Paenitentiam Agere, an encyclical he wrote on July 1, 1962:

But the faithful must also be encouraged to do outward acts of penance, both to keep their bodies under the strict control of reason and faith, and to make amends for their own and other people's sins ... St. Augustine issued the same insistent warning: "It is not enough for a man to change his ways for the better and to give up the practice of evil, unless by painful penance, sorrow[ful] humility, the sacrifice of a contrite heart and the giving of alms he makes amends to God for all that he has done wrong." ... But besides bearing in a Christian spirit the inescapable annoyances and sufferings of this life, the faithful ought also take the initiative in doing voluntary acts of penance and offering them to God. ... Since, therefore, "Christ has suffered in the flesh," it is only fitting that we be "armed with the same intent." It is right, too, to seek example and inspiration from the great saints of the Church. Pure as they were, they inflicted such mortifications upon themselves as to leave us almost aghast with admiration. And as we contemplate their saintly heroism, shall not we be moved by God's grace to impose on ourselves some voluntary sufferings and deprivations, we whose consciences are perhaps weighed down by so heavy a burden of guilt?

Pope Paul VI also stated:

"The necessity of mortification of the flesh stands clearly revealed if we consider the fragility of our nature, in which, since Adam’s sin, flesh and spirit have contrasting desires. This exercise of bodily mortification—far removed from any form of stoicism—does not imply a condemnation of the flesh which the Son of God deigned to assume. On the contrary, mortification aims at the 'liberation' of man."

== Pain, human nature, and Christ ==
Theologians also state that God as the Son, the second person of the Trinity, united himself, as a truly human person (through the hypostatic union), to everything human (except sin), including pain.

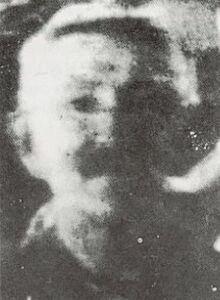
Venerable Matt Talbot (1856–1925) was an Irish worker whose life would have gone unnoticed were it not for the cords and chains discovered on his body when he died.

Catholics believe that God, who in their view by his divine nature cannot change, has united with changing human nature, and therefore with human pain. The "I" of the Second Person suffers and feels pain. He is one with pain through Jesus Christ. Thus Christ's experience of pain (as with all the human experiences of Christ—like sleeping, crying, speaking) whose subject is the divine Person, is an infinite act. This is based on the classic dictum that the acts belong to the Person (actiones sunt suppositorum). It is the Person who acts: It is God who walks, God who talks, God who is killed, and God who is in pain. Thus a Christian who is united to Jesus Christ through pain is one with his infinite act of saving the world.

This also goes together with another dictum in theology: whatever is not united (to the Divine Person) is not saved. Thus, his intellect, his will, his feelings, are all united with the Person, and are all sanctified and redeemed, including pain. Pain is therefore a sanctified and redeeming human experience.

== The salvific meaning of suffering ==
John Paul II, who according to a recently released book on his sainthood cause practiced self-flagellation and fasting before important events, wrote an entire apostolic letter on the topic of suffering, specifically the salvific meaning of suffering: Salvifici doloris. It is considered a major contribution to the theology of pain and suffering.

He wrote this after suffering from a bullet wound due to the assassination attempt of Ali Agca. Six weeks after meeting his attacker, he wrote about suffering in Christianity.

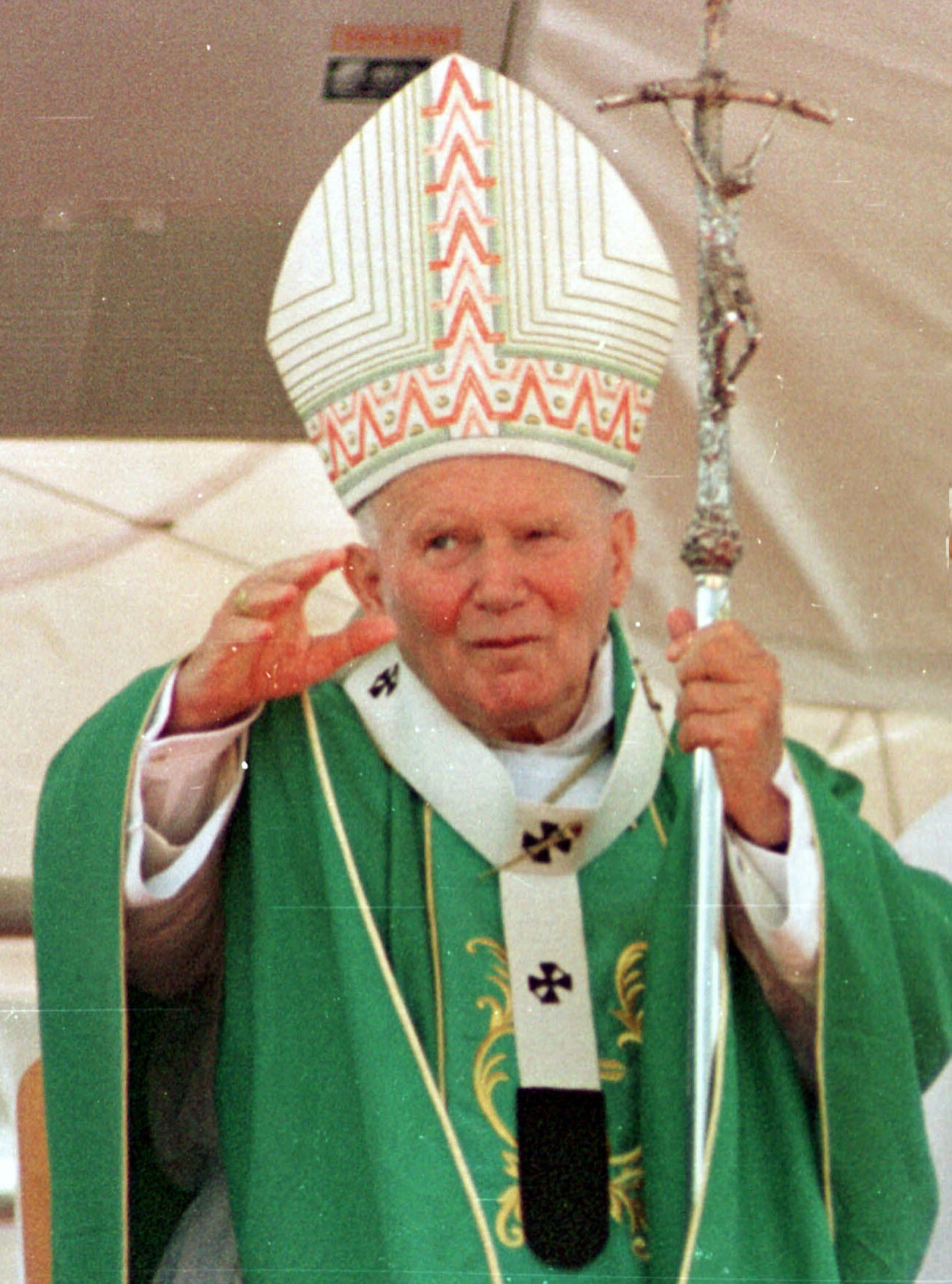
Pope John Paul II: "Suffering, more than anything else, makes present in the history of humanity the powers of the Redemption."

"Christ did not conceal from his listeners the need for suffering. He said very clearly: "If any man would come after me... let him take up his cross daily, and before his disciples he placed demands of a moral nature that can only be fulfilled on condition that they should "deny themselves". The way that leads to the Kingdom of heaven is "hard and narrow", and Christ contrasts it to the "wide and easy" way that "leads to destruction."

Christ does not explain in the abstract the reasons for suffering, but he states: "Follow me!". Come! Take part through your suffering in this work of saving the world, a salvation achieved through my suffering! Through my Cross.

Gradually, as the individual takes up his cross, spiritually uniting himself to the Cross of Christ, the salvific meaning of suffering is revealed before him. ...It is then that man finds in his suffering interior peace and even spiritual joy."

== Joy in suffering ==
Saint Paul speaks of joy in suffering in Colossians: "I rejoice in my sufferings for your sake". He had found a source of joy in overcoming the sense of the uselessness of suffering.

He states that it is suffering, more than anything else, which clears the way for the grace which transforms human souls. Suffering, more than anything else, makes present in the history of humanity the powers of the Redemption.

St. Louis de Montfort's prayer to the Virgin Mary includes, in his request to become more like Mary, the clauses "to suffer joyfully without human consolation; to die continually to myself without respite". Louis de Montfort was a strong advocate of finding joy and holiness in suffering. Those who have completed his 33-day Total Consecration to Jesus to Mary often wear a metal chain around their wrist or ankle. While this is not necessarily mortification, it represents a constant reminder of one's voluntary spiritual enslavement to Jesus through Mary, and the desire to accept suffering as a gift and offer it to God.

== The need for prudence and true purpose ==
The Desert Fathers emphasized that mortification is a means, not an end. They generally recommended prudence when practicing mortification, with severe mortifications done only under the guidance of an experienced spiritual director. The church teaches that practicing mortification for physical pleasure, far from being a path to spiritual enlightenment or redemption, is actually the opposite: a sin. Likewise, mortification for reasons of scrupulosity (a disordered or irrational thinking about one's guilt or state, which may affect a person and change their behaviours in ways similar to certain severe mental illnesses, such as obsessive–compulsive disorder or eating disorders) is considered very harmful: a contemporary example is fasting due to anorexia nervosa. Thus, Catholic moral theologians recommend that the scrupulous and especially the mentally ill: not practice mortification; avoid persons and materials of an ascetical nature; and receive frequent spiritual direction and psychological help.

Further, not all forms of self-mortification are approved of by the Church. Practices such as the nonlethal crucifixions performed on Good Friday in the Philippines are generally frowned upon by Catholic officials. These events include participants imitating various parts of the Passion of Christ, including his crucifixion. The spectacle draws large numbers of tourists spectators every year.

== See also ==
- Mortification (theology)
- Mortification of the flesh
- Criticism of the Catholic Church § Associated psychology
