= Redemptive suffering =

Belief that suffering, in union with the Passion of Jesus, can remit punishment for sin

Redemptive suffering is the Christian belief that human suffering, when accepted and offered up in union with the Passion of Jesus, can remit the just punishment for one's sins or for the sins of another, or for the other physical or spiritual needs of oneself or another. In Christianity, it is a tenet of Catholic theology, although it is taught in Reformed doctrine as well.

Pope John Paul II stated, "Each man, in his sufferings, can also become a sharer in the redemptive suffering of Christ". (cf. Colossians 1:24) Like an indulgence, redemptive suffering does not gain the individual forgiveness for their sin; forgiveness results from God's grace, freely given through Christ, which cannot be earned. (see Romans 4:3-5)

== Forms ==
Religious practitioners in various traditions have found spiritual benefits from voluntarily bringing upon themselves additional pain and discomfort through corporal mortification. One extreme example of redemptive suffering, which existed in the 13th and 14th centuries in Europe, was the Flagellant movement. As a partial response to the Black Death, these radicals, who were later condemned as heretics in the Catholic Church, engaged in body mortification, usually by whipping themselves, to repent for their sins, which they believed led to the Black Death.(cf. 2 Samuel 24:10-15)

=== Roman Catholic teaching ===
The Catechism of the Catholic Church states the following concerning redemptive suffering:

Moved by so much suffering Christ not only allows himself to be touched by the sick, but he makes their miseries his own: "He took our infirmities and bore our diseases." But he did not heal all the sick. His healings were signs of the coming of the Kingdom of God. They announced a more radical healing: the victory over sin and death through his Passover. On the cross Christ took upon himself the whole weight of evil and took away the "sin of the world," of which illness is only a consequence. By his passion and death on the cross Christ has given a new meaning to suffering: it can henceforth configure us to him and unite us with his redemptive Passion.

== Descriptions ==
Thérèse of Lisieux wrote the following about her own redemptive suffering from her deathbed:

Oh, Mother, what does it matter to write eloquently about suffering! Nothing! nothing! One must have experience of actual suffering to know the value of such utterances. … I know well now that all I have said and written is entirely true. … It is true that I have desired to suffer much for God, and it is true that I desire it still. … No, it is not frightful. A little victim of love can never find frightful that which her Bridegroom sends her …

Likewise, Padre Pio said the following about the purification brought about through redemptive suffering:

"I want your soul to be purified and tried by a daily hidden martyrdom. How many times," Jesus said to me a little while ago, "would you have abandoned me, my son, if I had not crucified you."

== Reformed Christianity ==
In Reformed theology, "redemptive suffering is that voluntarily undertaken in the cause of justice and the effort to combat disease."

== See also ==
- Atonement
- Confraternity of penitents
- Instruments of penance
- Mystici Corporis
- Roman Catholic theology
- Salvifici doloris
- Victim soul
