= Audrey Santo =

American Stigmata sufferer (1983–2007)

Audrey Marie Santo (19 December 1983 – 14 April 2007), often referred to as Little Audrey, was an American girl from Worcester, Massachusetts, who, at the age of three, experienced a near-drowning accident that left her in a persistent vegetative state. Unable to speak or move, Santo became the center of a religious phenomenon as her family and others reported a series of extraordinary occurrences in her presence. News of these events spread, drawing thousands of pilgrims to the Santo home, many believing Audrey to be a "victim soul" who suffered for the sins of others and interceded with God on their behalf. Media coverage brought international attention to Santo's case, fuelling both fervent belief and skeptical scrutiny.

The Catholic Church, while acknowledging the family's dedication to Santo's care, initiated an investigation into the reported phenomena. The investigation found no evidence of fraud but maintained that praying to Santo was contrary to Catholic teaching. Bishop Reilly of the Diocese of Worcester, seeking to contain the burgeoning phenomenon and protect the family's privacy, placed restrictions on public access to Audrey, while permitting continued private veneration by the clergy. Though the Church has yet to pronounce on the veracity of the claims surrounding her, a foundation dedicated to Santo's beatification and canonization continues to operate, gathering testimonies of healings attributed to her intercession.

== Accident ==
Audrey Santo was the youngest of four children born to Linda and Steve Santo. On August 9, 1987, three-year-old Audrey was playing outside in the driveway with her four-year-old brother Stephen. When Stephen came inside alone, Linda and her twelve-year-old son, Matthew, went to look for Audrey and found her face down in the backyard swimming pool. Matthew dove in and pulled Audrey from the pool, and she was rushed to the hospital.

Audrey remained in a coma for about three weeks, in intensive care at UMass Medical Center in Worcester. After four months at UMass Medical Center, Audrey was discharged to her family home on South Flagg Street in Worcester, where she remained under her family's care until her death in 2007.

== Health ==
Once she returned home, Audrey required 24-hour nursing care, provided by her family and a team of nurses provided by the Massachusetts Commission for the Blind. She breathed through a ventilator and was on a feeding tube for sustenance, purportedly taking only communion wafers by mouth.

Audrey's family reported that she was in a state called akinetic mutism—unable to speak and with limited movement, but fully alert and awake. However, Edward Kaye, the pediatric neurologist who treated her for eight years following the accident, told The Washington Post that "the cell death is about as bad as you can get and still be alive. Her EEGs are profoundly abnormal. She has brain stem activity, but very, very little above the brain stem." A coma specialist, Ed Cooper, brought in by Linda Santo to help Audrey communicate with her hands, told CBS's 48 Hours in 1999, "If she can become consistent with movements of her hands, down for 'yes,' up for 'no,' or vice versa, it would be meaningful. Right now it's inconsistent."

== Victim soul ==
About a year after the accident, Linda took Audrey to Međugorje, which is a popular pilgrimage site in the then Yugoslavia, where the Virgin Mary is purported to have appeared periodically to six local Catholics since 1981, and Linda believed it could result in Audrey being healed.

While in Međugorje, Audrey did not experience a physical healing, but reportedly showed signs of animation when visionary Ivan Dragicevic relayed a message to her from the Virgin Mary. Linda states that Audrey communicated directly with the Virgin Mary and agreed to become a victim soul. Though not an officially recognized term in the Catholic Church, a "victim soul" is generally understood as a pious individual, often chronically ill or disabled, who willingly takes on the suffering of others as a form of spiritual sacrifice, interceding with God on their behalf.

== Miracle claims ==
Numerous miracles are associated with Audrey. These reported miracles, primarily taking place in her family home, attracted thousands of pilgrims and garnered international media attention. As word spread about Audrey, visitors began coming to pray for healing near Audrey's bedside. Eventually, the family set up visiting hours and built a window in Audrey's bedroom wall through which visitors could view her. The window was later removed by order of the bishop. Audrey was also on several occasions taken to a nearby college stadium or a large church, for a mass at which she could be viewed by the public.

=== Stigmata and Signs of Christ's Passion ===
Witnesses, including Audrey's mother and nurses, reported red stripes appearing across her body, likened to whip marks, a year after the accident. Marks, variously described as "creases", "cavities", "purple marks", or "wounds", were observed on Audrey's palms, feet, and forehead. Reports claimed that on Good Fridays, Audrey would position herself with arms outstretched, reminiscent of the crucifixion.

=== Weeping Statues and Religious Objects ===
Beginning in 1993, statues and images in Audrey's bedroom, including a picture of the Virgin of Guadalupe, were reported by Linda to weep oil and blood. Linda also claimed that chalices in Audrey's presence would also pour forth oil, which mysteriously dried up during Lent. The oil was collected in cups and given to visitors on cotton balls. Even after Audrey's death in 2007, the Santo family home continued to experience mystical occurrences, including religious objects secreting oil. A laboratory analysis of the oil found on religious objects in the Santo home revealed a mixture primarily composed of olive oil.

=== Bleeding Communion Hosts ===
According to nurses, six consecrated hosts have either bled or secreted oil in Audrey's presence. In one instance, a documentary film crew for Audrey's Life: Voice of a Silent Soul, directed by John Clote, captured footage of a priest discovering a bleeding host during a mass at the Santo home. A substance that appeared to be blood also appeared in a chalice at the Santo home, and a statue of Mary appeared to cry blood. The Bishop of Worcester appointed an independent commission to investigate these Eucharistic phenomena. The commission found no evidence of fraud but offered no explanation for the occurrences.

=== Miraculous Healings ===
Pilgrims attributed a range of healings to Audrey's intercession, including recovery from cancer, throat cancer, and severe injuries from a motorcycle accident. Andrea Pearson, believing Audrey cured her cancer, was featured in a 48 Hours segment. However, her cancer later returned, prompting questions about the validity of the initial healing. A Rhode Island mother also claims that an intercessory prayer to Audrey saved her choking daughter. Despite widespread belief in Audrey's healing powers, none of the reported healings were officially verified by the Catholic Church or medical professionals. Likewise, despite being bedridden for years, Audrey reportedly never developed bedsores, which medical experts found perplexing.

=== Supernatural Phenomena ===
Visitors frequently reported smelling roses in Audrey's bedroom and the chapel, even when no flowers were present. In 1993, some statues in Audrey's room were found turned to face a tabernacle. On Good Friday in 1996, the tabernacle in Audrey's room reportedly began bleeding.

=== Personal Experiences and Spiritual Connections ===
Though unable to speak or move much, Audrey was said to gaze intently at visitors, turning her head and seemingly acknowledging their presence. Linda Santo and others would read letters sent from around the world to Audrey, who appeared to listen attentively. People claimed to receive spiritual or physical healing as a result of these prayers. Linda described a vision she had while in Međugorje, where she saw Audrey's face radiating from the moon. This vision solidified the belief in a mystical connection between Audrey and the Marian apparitions. Audrey once had a rash similar to a rash usually experienced by those undergoing chemotherapy for cancer, evidence that, supporters suggested, she had taken on the suffering of some visitor with cancer.

While Audrey's supporters firmly believed in the miraculous nature of these events, critics attributed them to pious fraud, psychological phenomena, or natural occurrences. The Catholic Church, while acknowledging the dedication of the Santo family, remained cautious in its official pronouncements, emphasizing the need for thorough investigation and adherence to established doctrines.

== Death and funeral ==
Audrey Santo died at the age of 23 on Saturday, April 14, 2007, at approximately 4:00 am, from cardio-respiratory failure. A vigil was held April 17, 2007 the night before the funeral, both at St. Paul's Cathedral in Worcester, Massachusetts. Both events were open to the public, but the burial was private.

== Catholic Church's position ==
Following years of reported miracles and growing public attention, Bishop Daniel Patrick Reilly of the Diocese of Worcester appointed a commission to investigate the phenomena surrounding Audrey. The investigation, completed in 1998, concluded that there was no evidence of fraud, but did not confirm any of the miraculous claims. The commission recommended further study into the composition of the oils and the possibility of Audrey's awareness and ability to communicate.

Bishop Reilly issued a statement outlining the Church's position. While praising the Santo family's dedication to Audrey's care, he stressed that praying to Audrey was not acceptable in Catholic teaching and urged continued prayers for her and her family. The statement also discouraged pilgrimages to the Santo home, citing concerns for the family's well-being and the potential for compromising Audrey's care.

The reported phenomena surrounding Audrey, while investigated, have not met the Catholic Church's criteria for official recognition. The Church's position remains one of cautious observation, balancing a respect for the Santo family and the faith generated by Audrey's story with the need to uphold doctrinal boundaries and avoid any endorsement of potentially unorthodox beliefs or practices.

=== Case for sainthood ===
A nonprofit foundation is pursuing the process of sainthood for Audrey. The Bishop of Worcester, Robert J. McManus, gave official recognition to the foundation, allowing them to present their application to the Congregation for the Causes of Saints in Rome, while remaining neutral himself as to whether Audrey should be a saint.

Beatification and canonization require at least two fully documented and authenticated miracles. The board of directors of the Audrey Santo Foundation asked in a web update on August 12, 2013, that "if anyone has specific knowledge of any such miracles, they must come forward [so] that the proper protocol is followed."

== Bibliography ==
- "Audrey Marie Santo". Britton Funeral Homes. 2007.
- Barry, Ellen (December 12, 1997). "The Strange Case of Audrey Santo". Boston Phoenix. Archived from the original on October 13, 2007.
- "Believers pray for 'miracle' coma girl". ABC News. August 7, 2000.
- Clark, Edie (2002). "Audrey's Story". edieclark.com.
- Croteau, Scott J. (April 16, 2007). "Beloved Audrey Marie Santo, 23, dies". Telegram and Gazette.
- Kandra, Deacon Greg (October 14, 2008). "'Little Audrey' Considered for Sainthood?". Catholic Online.
- Kane, Paula (2002). "'She offered herself up': The Victim Soul and Victim Spirituality in Catholicism". Church History. 71 (1): 80–119. doi:10.1017/S0009640700095160. JSTOR 4146692.
- Knap, Patty (June 29, 2021). "Miracles Continue to Surround Audrey Santo". Catholic Stand.
- "Letter from Board of Directors". Little Audrey Santo Foundation. August 12, 2013. Archived from the original on March 3, 2014.
- "Little Audrey's Story". Little Audrey Santo Foundation. n.d. Archived from the original on March 3, 2014.
- "The Miracle of Dripping Oil". CBS News. June 23, 1999.
- Moriarty, Erin (July 7, 1999). "The Miracle of the Dripping Oil". CBS News. 48 Hours.
- Nickell, Joe (1999). "Miracles or Deception: The Pathetic Case of Audrey Santo".
- Orsi, Robert A. (2005). Between Heaven and Earth: The Religious Worlds People Make and the Scholars Who Study Them. Princeton University Press. ISBN 0-691-04903-3.
- "Push For 'Little Audrey's' Sainthood Begins". April 12, 2012.
- Reilly, Daniel P. (2003). "Diocese Issues Interim Findings on Miraculous Claims". Archived from the original on September 28, 2007.
- Schmalz, Mathew T. (2002). "The Silent Body of Audrey Santo". History of Religions. 42 (2): 116–142. doi:10.1086/463700.
- Weingarten, Gene (July 19, 1998). "Tears for Audrey". The Washington Post.
