= Totum Amoris Est =

Document by Pope Francis

Totum Amoris Est (‘Everything Pertains to Love’) is an Apostolic Letter of Pope Francis, on the fourth centenary of the death of the Doctor of the Church, St. Francis de Sales.

== Background ==
Pope Francis emphasizes the vocation of St. Francis de Sales and his teaching that "in every situation in life where the greatest love is to be found."

In the section on the criterion of love, Pope Francis quotes the saint:

“It is love that grants perfection to our works. I will tell you much more. Take a person who suffers martyrdom for God with an ounce of love; that person merits much, since he could give nothing greater than his own life. Yet another person who has only suffered a scratch with two ounces of love will have much more merit, because it is charity and love that give value to our works”.
