= Salvifici doloris =

Apostolic letter by Pope John Paul II

Salvifici doloris ("redemptive suffering") is a February 1984 Apostolic letter by Pope John Paul II. Its theme was suffering in general in the light of the cross and salvific or redemptive suffering in particular. It was issued in connection with the 1983 Holy Jubilee Year of Redemption.

Its foundational Bible text was taken from the words of the Apostle Paul where he said: "In my flesh I complete what is lacking in Christ's afflictions for the sake of his body, that is, the Church". The meditation flows from Pope John Paul II's own experience of bereavement, illness and pain including his recovery from the assassination attempt of 1981.

The theme of redemptive suffering or "partnership in suffering" is included in the Catechism of the Catholic Church.

== Scriptural allusions ==
Scriptural allusions in the document include the sufferings of Paul the Apostle, Isaiah's depiction of the suffering servant in Isaiah 53, and Jesus's parable of the Good Samaritan.

== Structure ==
Salvifici doloris has 8 parts or chapters:

1. Introduction
2. The World of Human Suffering
3. The Quest for an Answer to the Question of the Meaning of Suffering
4. Jesus Christ: Suffering Conquered by Love
5. Sharers in the Sufferings of Christ
6. The Gospel of Suffering
7. The Good Samaritan
8. Conclusion

== Quotes ==
In the Cross of Christ not only is the Redemption accomplished through suffering, but also human suffering itself has been redeemed,. Christ, - without any fault of his own - took on himself "the total evil of sin". The experience of this evil determined the incomparable extent of Christ's suffering, which became the price of the Redemption.

In bringing about the Redemption through suffering, Christ has also raised human suffering to the level of the Redemption. Thus each man, in his suffering, can also become a sharer in the redemptive suffering of Christ.

Those who share in Christ's sufferings have before their eyes the Paschal Mystery of the Cross and Resurrection, in which Christ descends, in a first phase, to the ultimate limits of human weakness and impotence: indeed, he dies nailed to the Cross. But if at the same time in this weakness there is accomplished his lifting up, confirmed by the power of the Resurrection, then this means that the weaknesses of all human sufferings are capable of being infused with the same power of God manifested in Christ's Cross. In such a concept, to suffer means to become particularly susceptible, particularly open to the working of the salvific powers of God, offered to humanity in Christ. In him God has confirmed his desire to act especially through suffering, which is man's weakness and emptying of self, and he wishes to make his power known precisely in this weakness and emptying of self.

== See also ==
- Redemptive suffering
- Totum Amoris Est
