= Shen Zhu =

Taiwanese ceremonial pigs

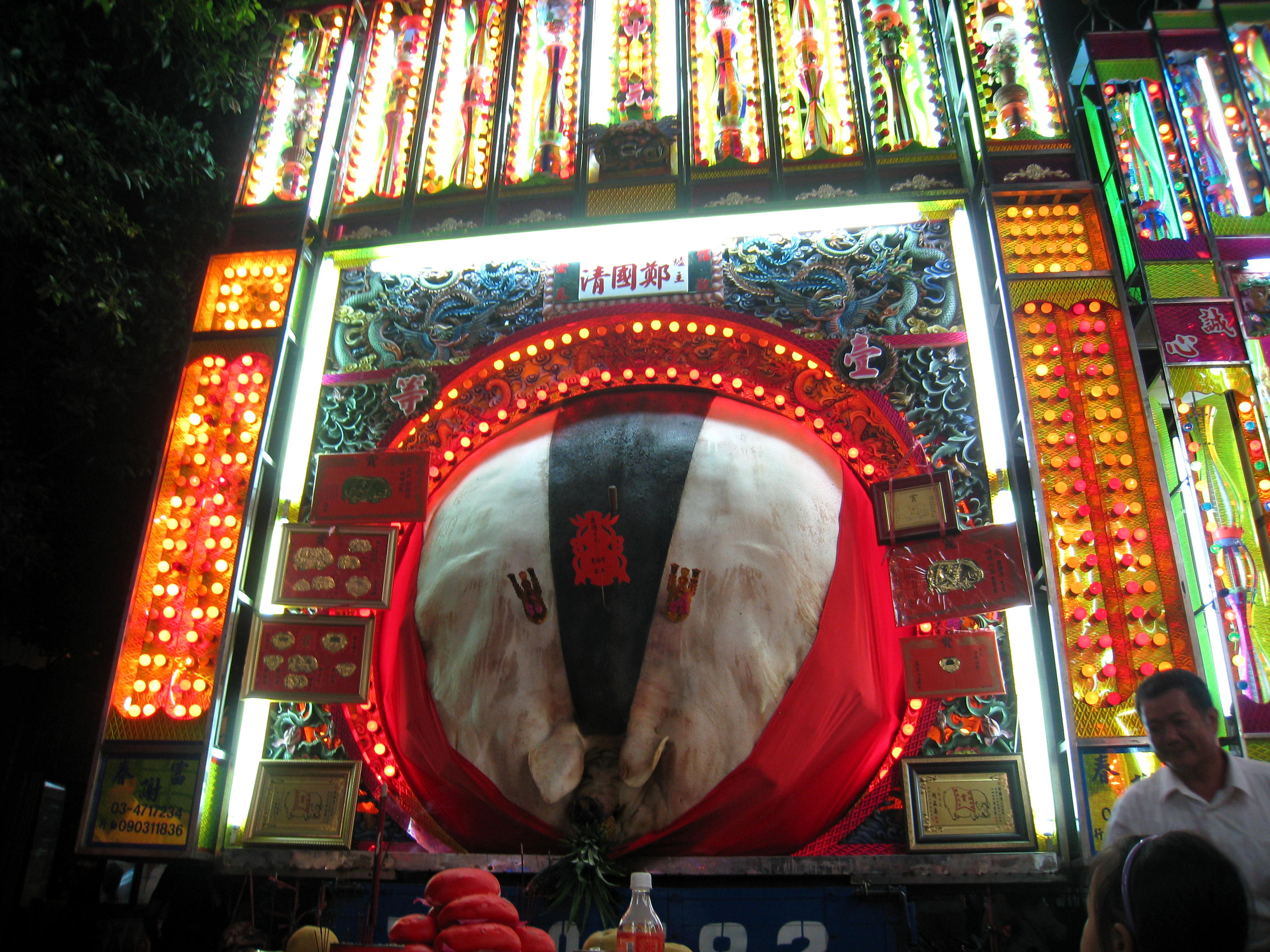
Shen Zhu in Zhong Yuan Festival, Taiwan.

Shen Zhu or God Pig, sometimes known as Holy pig (traditional Chinese: 神豬; simplified Chinese: 神猪; pinyin: shénzhū; Wade–Giles: shen-chu; Pe̍h-ōe-jī: sîn-tu), are pigs that have been chronically fattened for use in Hakka religious and cultural ceremonies, such as the Yimin Festival and the Lunar New Year celebration in Sanxia, northern Taiwan. Pigs are fattened in a process similar to gavage to make them as large as possible in preparation for contests and awards at the festival. The heaviest pig is declared the winner, and the owner may receive a prize. The winning pig and other pigs entered into the contest are ritually killed as a sacrifice to the City God or a local deity, one popular temple that continues this tradition is Changfu Temple which is dedicated to the deified Buddhist monk Master Qingshui. However, contrary to popular belief, the pig is not sacrificed to Master Qingshui, but to the mountain deities.

After being slaughtered, the hair of the winning pig is removed or the bristles shaved into patterns, and the skin is stretched across a metal frame. Further decorations are added, such as placing a pineapple in the pig's mouth. The stretched skin, along with the carcasses or stretched skins of the other fattened pigs, are then paraded on a float. Many Holy pigs end up weighing over 800 kilograms (1,800 lb), whereas a normal pig would weigh only 120 kilograms (260 lb).

The tradition of sacrificing fattened pigs did not become commonplace at the centuries-old Yimin Festival until the early 20th century, and it was "turbocharged" in the late 21st century. In urban areas with no access to farms housing such large animals, or places where animal cruelty objections have been raised, the contests instead have become art projects for children to create decorated pig statues. The 2020 Yimin Festival had two entries that were made up of rice packets displayed in the shape of a pig.

== Controversy ==
The practice of feeding the pigs to become so heavy has been criticized as inhumane, partly because the great weights limit the pig's movements and strains their internal organs.

Animal welfare advocates, like the Environment and Animal Society of Taiwan, note that the pigs are often force fed, kept in small cages, and so heavy they can't stand up.
