= Holy Week =

Week leading up to Easter

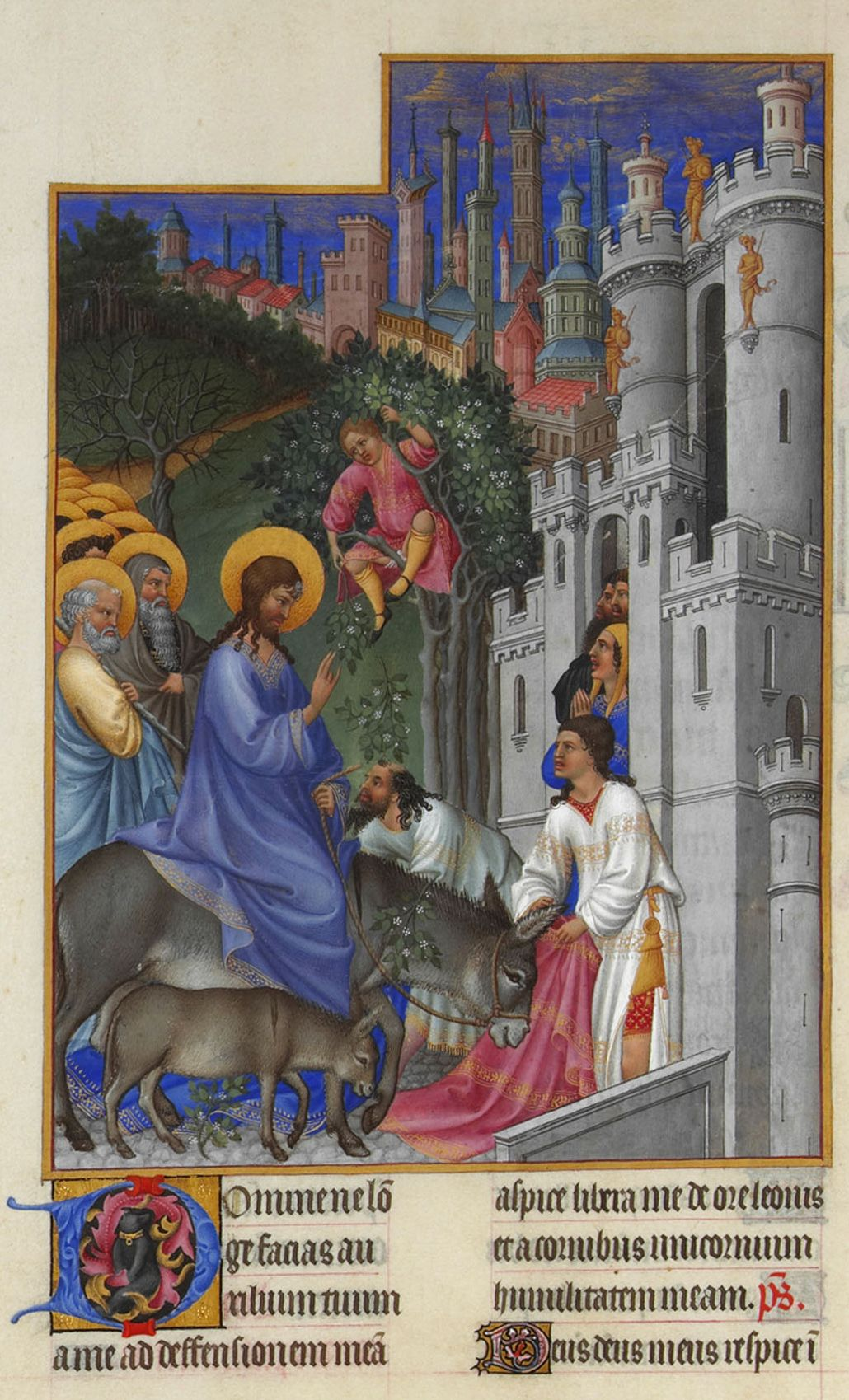
- The entry of Jesus and his disciples into Jerusalem on Palm Sunday marks the beginning of Holy Week, is the last week of Lent, between Palm Sunday and the dusk of Maundy Thursday. In the Eastern Orthodox Church, Palm Sunday along with the Saturday of Lazarus marks the two-day transition between the 40 days of Great Lent and Holy Week.
- Type: Christian
- Observances: Palm Sunday, Holy Monday, Holy Tuesday, Holy Wednesday, Maundy Thursday, Good Friday, Holy Saturday and Easter Sunday
- Date: Last week of Lent
- 2025 date: April 13 – April 19 (Western); April 13 – April 19 (Eastern)
- 2026 date: March 29 – April 4 (Western); April 5 – April 11 (Eastern)
- 2027 date: March 21 – March 27 (Western); April 25 – May 1 (Eastern)
- 2028 date: April 9 – April 15 (Western); April 9 – April 15 (Eastern)
- Duration: 7 days
- Frequency: Annual
- Related to: Eastertide

Holy Week (Koine Greek: Ἁγία καὶ Μεγάλη Ἑβδομάς, romanized: Hagía kaì Megálē Hebdomás, lit. 'Holy and Great Week') commemorates the seven days leading up to Easter. It begins with the commemoration of Christ's triumphal entry into Jerusalem on Palm Sunday, marks the betrayal of Jesus on Spy Wednesday (Holy Wednesday), climaxing with the commemoration of the Last Supper on Maundy Thursday (Holy Thursday) and the Passion of Jesus on Good Friday (Holy Friday). Holy Week concludes with Christ's death and descent into hell on Holy Saturday. For all Christian traditions, it is a moveable observance. In Eastern Christianity, which also calls it Great Week, it is the week following Great Lent and Lazarus Saturday, starting on the evening of Palm Sunday and concluding on the evening of Great Saturday. In Western Christianity, (Note: Western Christian denominations that observe Holy Week include the Roman Catholic, Lutheran, Western Orthodox, Moravian, Anglican, Irvingian and United Protestant denominations, as well as many Methodist churches and Reformed (including certain Continental Reformed, Presbyterian and Congregationalist churches) traditions.) Holy Week is the sixth and last week of Lent, beginning with Palm Sunday and concluding on Holy Saturday.

Christians believe that Jesus rested in death from the ninth hour (3 pm) on Good Friday until just before dawn on Sunday morning, the day of his resurrection from death, known as Easter Sunday. However, in 1 Peter 3:19, there may be a clue as to a task Jesus performed during this period between death and resurrection: "By which also he went and preached unto the spirits in prison." This marks the beginning of the season of Eastertide, with its first week being known as Easter Week (or Bright Week).

Holy Week liturgies generally attract the largest crowds of the year. Many Christian cultures have different traditions such as special liturgies or services, floats, sculptures or live reenactments of Christ's life, his arrest and crucifixion (also called the Lord's Passion or Passion of Jesus); the latter are known as Passion Plays, which are often interdenominational productions. In Eastern Rite churches there are also many means to commemorate the Great Feasts and emphasize the theme of resurrection.

== History ==
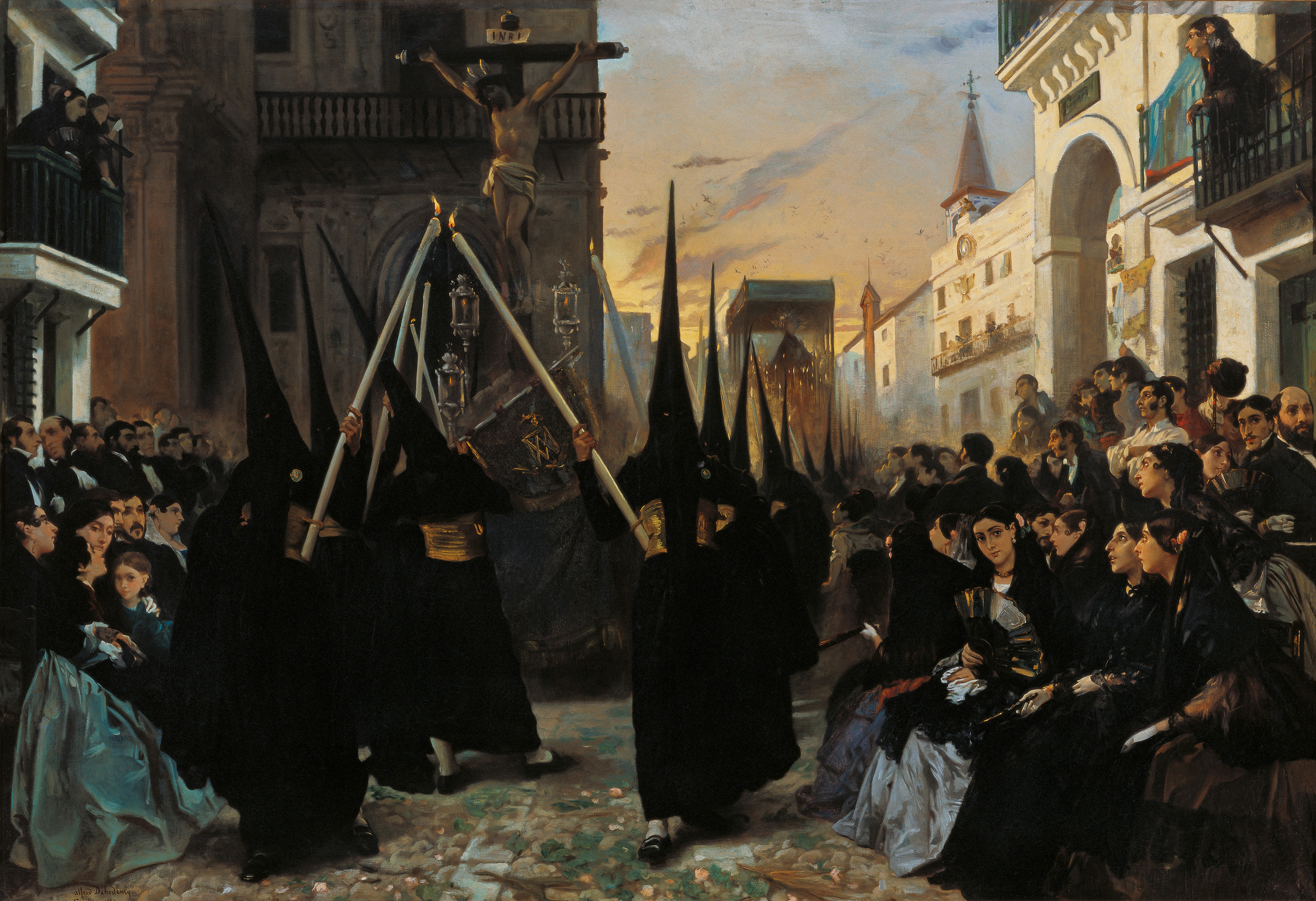
A Confraternity in Procession along Calle Génova, Seville by Alfred Dehodencq (1851)

Holy Week in the liturgical year is the week immediately before Easter. The earliest allusion to the custom of marking this week as a whole with special observances is to be found in the Apostolical Constitutions (v. 18, 19), dating from the latter half of the 3rd century and 4th century. In this text, abstinence from flesh is commanded for all the days, while for the Friday and Saturday an absolute fast is commanded. Dionysius Alexandrinus in his canonical epistle (AD 260), refers to the 91 fasting days implying that the observance of them had already become an established usage in his time.

There is some doubt about the genuineness of an ordinance attributed to Roman Emperor Constantine, in which abstinence from public business was enforced for the seven days immediately preceding Easter Day, and also for the seven which followed it. The Codex Theodosianus, however, is explicit in ordering that all actions at law should cease, and the doors of all courts of law be closed during those 15 days (1. ii. tit. viii.).

Of the particular days of the "great week" the earliest to emerge into special prominence was naturally Good Friday. Next came the Sabbatum Magnum ("Great Sabbath", i.e., Holy Saturday or Easter Eve) with its vigil, which in the early church was associated with an expectation that the second advent would occur on an Easter Day.

Other writings that refer to related traditions of the early Church include, most notably, The Pilgrimage of Etheria (also known as The Pilgrimage of Egeria), which details the whole observance of Holy Week at that time.

Today, in the Western Christian Church, among Lutherans, Anglicans, Methodists, Presbyterians and Catholics, the liturgies used for Holy Week are nearly identical. In the Episcopal Church, the main U.S. branch of the Anglican Communion, the 1979 Book of Common Prayer identifies Holy Week—comprising Palm Sunday (Sunday of the Passion) through Holy Saturday—as a separate season after Lent, rather than as part of it; but the weekdays of Holy Week, like those of Lent, are Days of Special Devotion to be observed by special acts of discipline and self-denial, so the practical effect is the same as if Holy Week were considered part of Lent.

In the Moravian Church, the Holy Week services (Passion Week) are extensive, as the congregation follows the life of Christ through his final week in daily services dedicated to readings from a harmony of the Gospel stories, responding to the actions in hymns, prayers and litanies, beginning on the eve of Palm Sunday and culminating in the Easter Morning or Easter Sunrise service begun by the Moravians in 1732.

== Holy Week in Western Christianity ==
=== Palm Sunday (Sixth Sunday of Lent) ===
Holy Week begins with Palm Sunday, complete: Palm and Passion Sunday (Latin Dominica in Palmis de Passione Domini). Traditionally, Palm Sunday commemorates the Triumphal entry into Jerusalem described in all four canonical gospels. As described in these accounts, Christ's entry into Jerusalem was noted by the crowds present who shouted praises and waved palm branches. In the Roman Rite, before 1955 it was known simply as Palm Sunday, and the preceding Sunday as Passion Sunday. From 1955 to 1971 it was called Second Sunday in Passiontide or Palm Sunday. Among Lutherans and Anglicans, the day is known as the Sunday of the Passion: Palm Sunday.

In many liturgical denominations, to commemorate Christ's entry into Jerusalem to accomplish his paschal mystery, it is customary to have a blessing of palm leaves or other branches, for example olive branches. The blessing ceremony includes the reading of a Gospel account of Jesus humbly riding into Jerusalem on a donkey, reminiscent of a Davidic victory procession, and people placing palm and other branches on the ground before him.

Immediately following this great time of celebration over the entrance of Jesus into Jerusalem, he begins his journey to the cross. The blessing is thus followed by a procession or solemn entrance into the church, with the participants holding the blessed branches in their hands. The liturgy includes the solemn reading of the Passion, the narrative of Christ's capture, suffering and death, as recounted in one of the Synoptic Gospels. (In the Tridentine Mass the Passion is always that of St. Matthew.)

Holy Week and other named days and day ranges around Lent and Easter in Western Christianity, with the fasting days of Lent numbered

Before the reform of the rite by Pope Pius XII, the blessing of the palms occurred inside the church within a liturgy that followed the general outline of a Mass, with Collect, Epistle and Gospel, as far as the Sanctus. The palms were then blessed with five prayers, and a procession went out of the church and on its return included a ceremony for the reopening of the doors, which had meanwhile been shut. After this the normal Mass was celebrated.

Churches of many denominations, including the Lutheran, Catholic, Methodist, Anglican, Moravian and Reformed traditions, distribute palm branches to their congregations during their Palm Sunday liturgies. Christians take these palms, which are often blessed by clergy, to their homes where they hang them alongside Christian art (especially crosses and crucifixes) or keep them in their Bibles or devotionals.

=== Holy Monday and Holy Tuesday ===
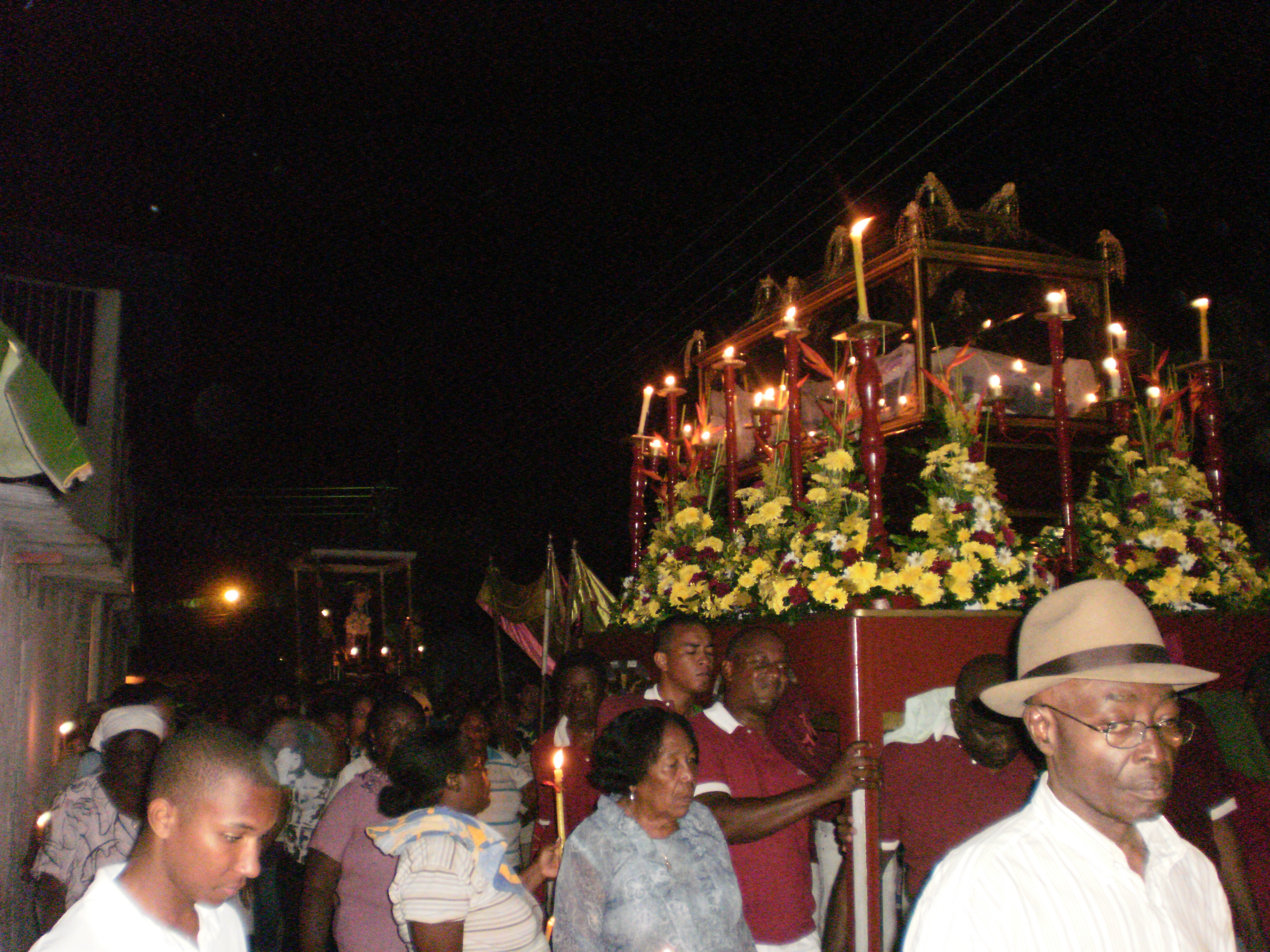
Holy Tuesday in Venezuela

The days between Palm Sunday and Maundy Thursday are known as Holy Monday, Holy Tuesday (Fig Tuesday), and Holy Wednesday (Spy Wednesday). There are traditional observances held by liturgical denominations to commemorate events from the last days of Jesus Christ's life. Among them:

- On Holy Monday, events observed in the liturgy may include Jesus cursing the fig tree, the cleansing of the Temple, the authority of Jesus questioned, and the anointing of Jesus at Bethany (John 12:1–11), an event that in the Gospel of John occurred before Palm Sunday as in John 12:12–19.
- On Holy Tuesday, some observe Christ's predictions of his own death, as described in John 12:20–36 and John 13:21–38. (In the Tridentine Mass the Passion according to St. Mark is read instead.)

=== Holy Wednesday (Spy Wednesday) ===
Miércoles Santo (Holy Wednesday) in Cádiz, Spain

On Holy Wednesday, the story of Judas arranging his betrayal of Jesus with the chief priests is remembered; he was a spy among the disciples of Jesus (Matthew 26:14–25). For this reason, the day is sometimes called "Spy Wednesday". (In the Tridentine Mass the Passion according to St. Luke is read instead.) Other events connected with this date include events at the house of Simon the Leper, especially the anointing of Jesus by Mary of Bethany, which directly preceded the betrayal of Jesus by Judas to the Sanhedrin.

Tenebrae (Latin for "shadows" or "darkness") is celebrated within Western Christianity during Holy Week, especially on Spy Wednesday. Tenebrae is distinctive for its gradual extinguishing of candles while a series of readings and psalms is chanted or recited. Tenebrae liturgies are celebrated by some parishes of the Roman Rite of the Catholic Church, the Polish National Catholic Church, the Lutheran churches, the Moravian Church, the Anglican Communion, the Methodist churches, and Western Rite Orthodoxy within the Eastern Orthodox Church.

=== Maundy Thursday ===
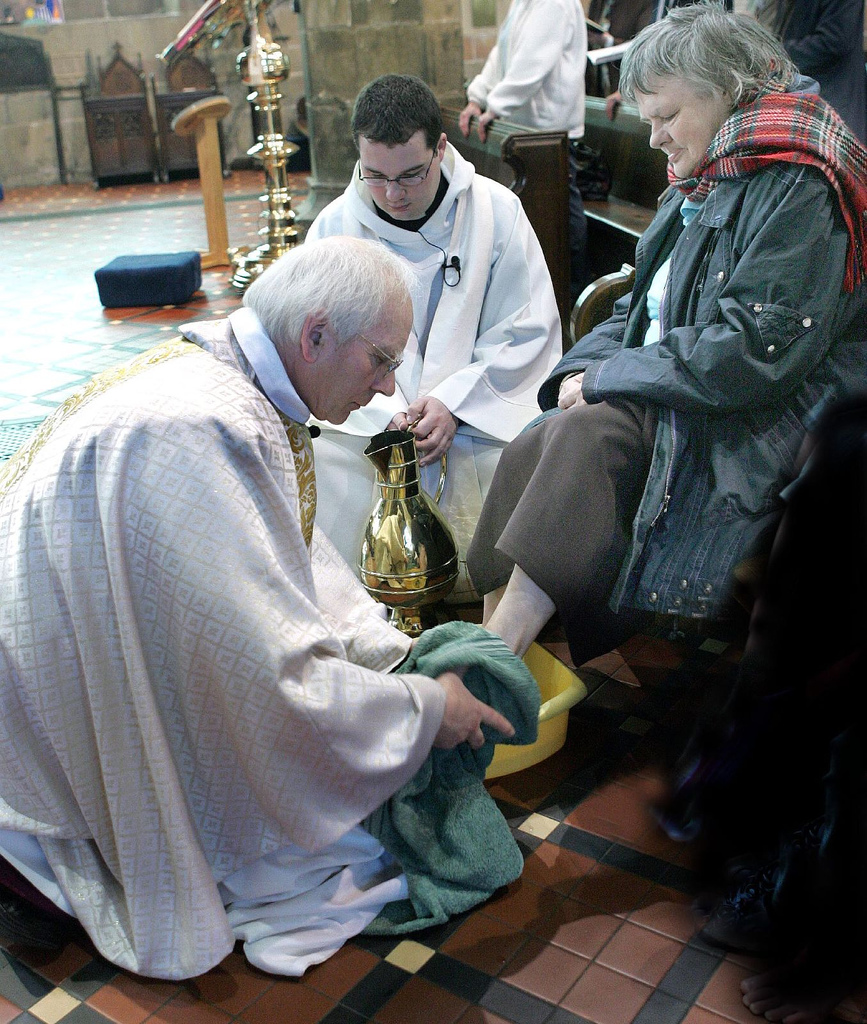
Maundy Thursday ceremony in a Church in Wales parish church during a Maundy Thursday service of worship

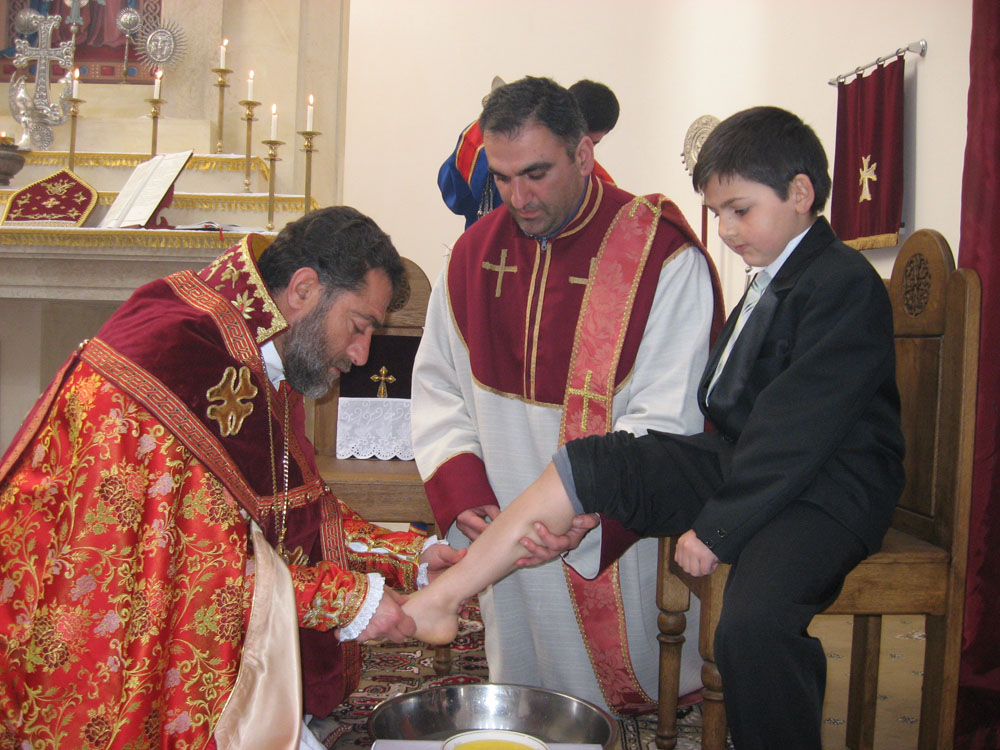
A Washing of Feet ceremony on Holy Thursday in the Armenian Orthodox church

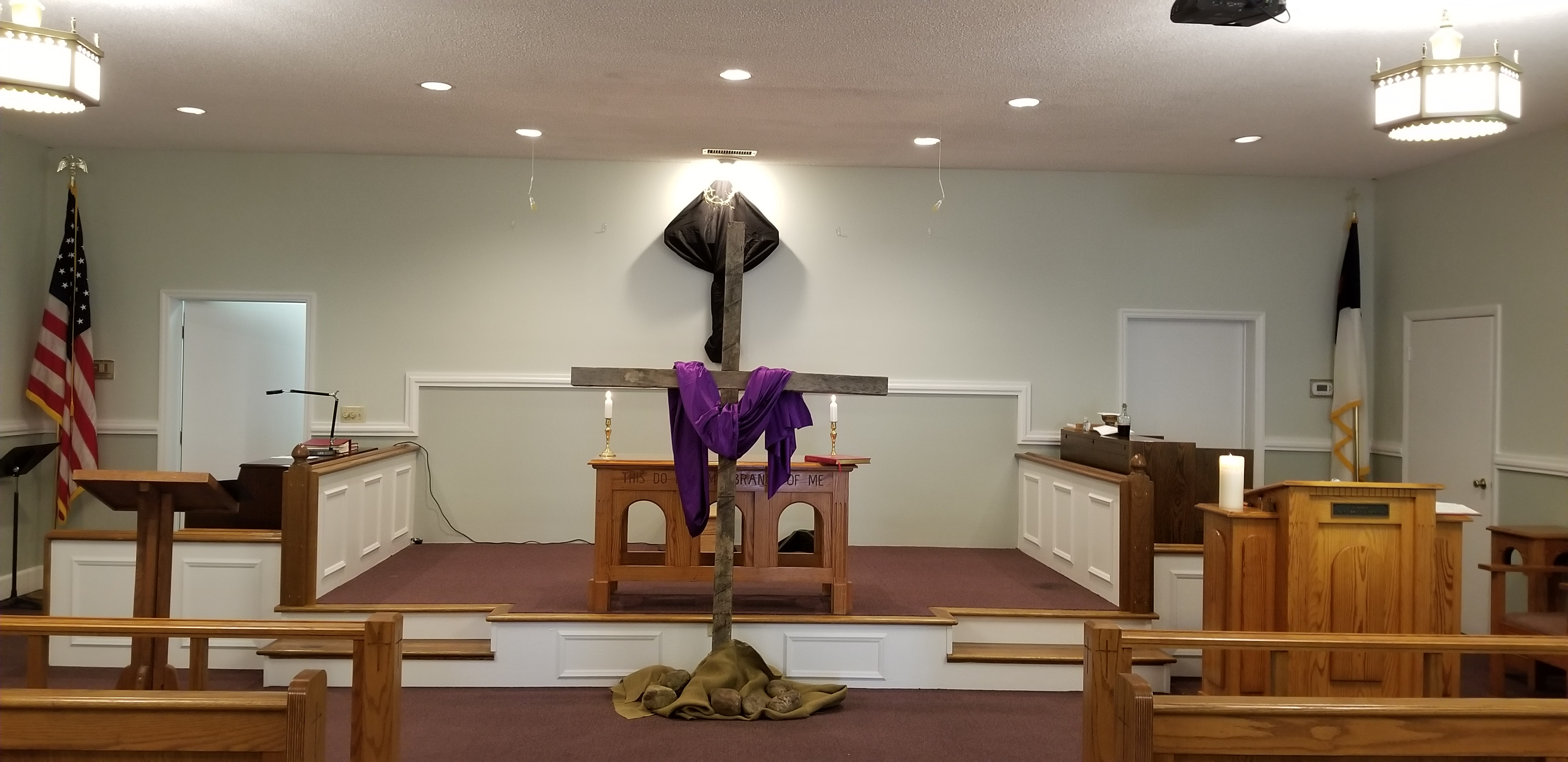
On Maundy Thursday, the altar of this Methodist church was stripped and the crucifix was veiled in black for Good Friday. A wooden cross sits in front of the bare chancel for the veneration of the cross ceremony.

Maundy Thursday (also known as Holy Thursday) commemorates the Last Supper, where Christ lays out the model for the Eucharist or Holy Communion. During the meal, Jesus predicted the events that would immediately follow, including his betrayal, the Denial of Peter, and his death and resurrection. The liturgical celebration of the Last Supper on Maundy Thursday marks the beginning of the Paschal Triduum. Catholic and Lutheran parishes traditionally practice the foot washing (Maundy) ceremony on Maundy Thursday, a practice also kept in other denominations.

In the Catholic Church, on this day the private celebration of Mass is forbidden. Thus, apart from the Chrism Mass for the blessing of the Holy Oils that the diocesan bishop may celebrate on the morning of Holy Thursday, but also on some other day close to Easter, the only Mass on this day is the evening Mass of the Lord's Supper, which inaugurates the period of three days known as the Easter Triduum, that includes Good Friday (seen as beginning with the liturgy of the preceding evening), Holy Saturday and Easter Sunday up to evening prayer on that day. The Chrism Mass, whose texts the Roman Missal and the rubrics used in Lutheran churches now give under Maundy Thursday, but before the Paschal Triduum which begins that evening, may be brought forward early in Holy Week, to facilitate participation by as many clergy of the diocese as possible together with the bishop. This Mass was not included in editions of the Roman Missal before the time of Pope Pius XII. In this Mass, the bishop blesses separate oils for the sick (used in Anointing of the Sick), for catechumens (used in baptism) and chrism (used in baptism, confirmation and the Holy Orders, as well as in rites such as the dedication of an altar and a church).

The Mass of the Lord's Supper commemorates the Last Supper of Jesus with his Twelve Apostles, "the institution of the Eucharist, the institution of the priesthood, and the commandment of brotherly love that Jesus gave after washing the feet of his disciples." All the bells of the church, including altar bells, may be rung during the Gloria in Excelsis Deo of the Mass (the Gloria is not traditionally sung on Sundays in Lent). The bells then fall silent and the organ and other musical instruments may be used only to support the singing until the Gloria at the Easter Vigil. The Roman Missal recommends that, if considered pastorally appropriate, the priest should, immediately after the homily, celebrate the rite of washing the feet of customarily twelve men, recalling the number of the apostles.

In the Catholic Church, Lutheran churches of Evangelical Catholic churchmanship, and in Anglican churches of an Anglo-Catholic churchmanship, a sufficient number of hosts are consecrated for use also in the Good Friday liturgy, and at the conclusion the Blessed Sacrament is carried in procession to a place of reposition away from the main body of the church, which, if it involves an altar, is often called an "altar of repose". In some places, notably the Philippines and Malta, Catholics will travel from church to church praying at each church's altar of repose in a practice called "Visita Iglesia" or Seven Churches Visitation.

In Lutheran, Anglican and Methodist churches, the altar has black paraments or the altar cloths are removed altogether. At the conclusion of the Maundy Thursday liturgy in Lutheran churches, the "lectern and pulpit are [also] left bare until Easter to symbolize the humiliation and barrenness of the cross." Methodist custom holds that apart from depictions of the Stations of the Cross, other images (such as the altar cross) continue the Lenten habitude of being veiled. In the Catholic Church, the altars of the church (except the one used as the altar of repose) are later stripped quite bare and, as much as possible, crosses are removed from the church (or veiled in the pre-Vatican II rite), crucifixes and statues are covered with violet covers during Passiontide, but the crucifix covers can be white instead of violet on Maundy Thursday).

=== Good Friday ===
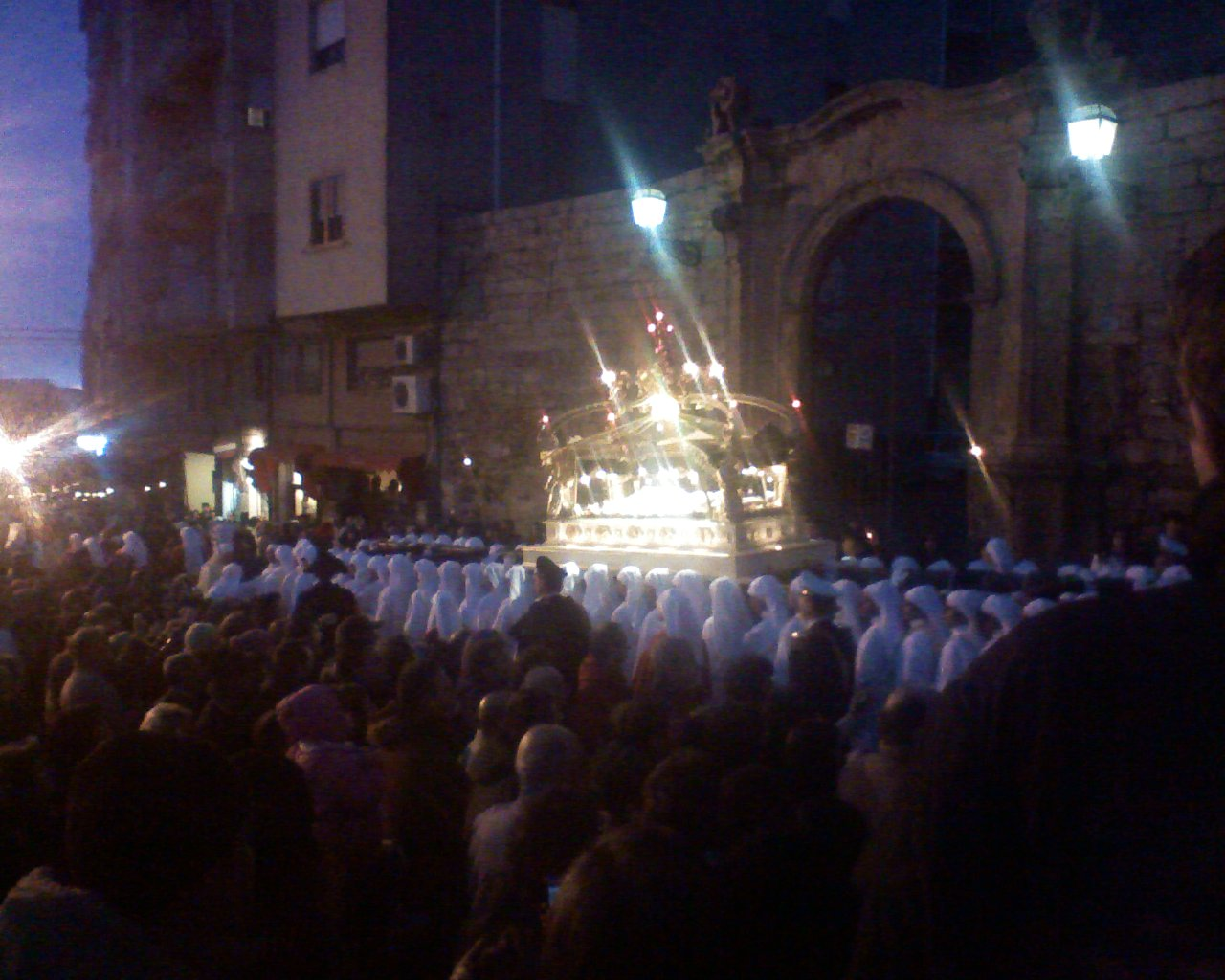
Good Friday in Enna, Italy

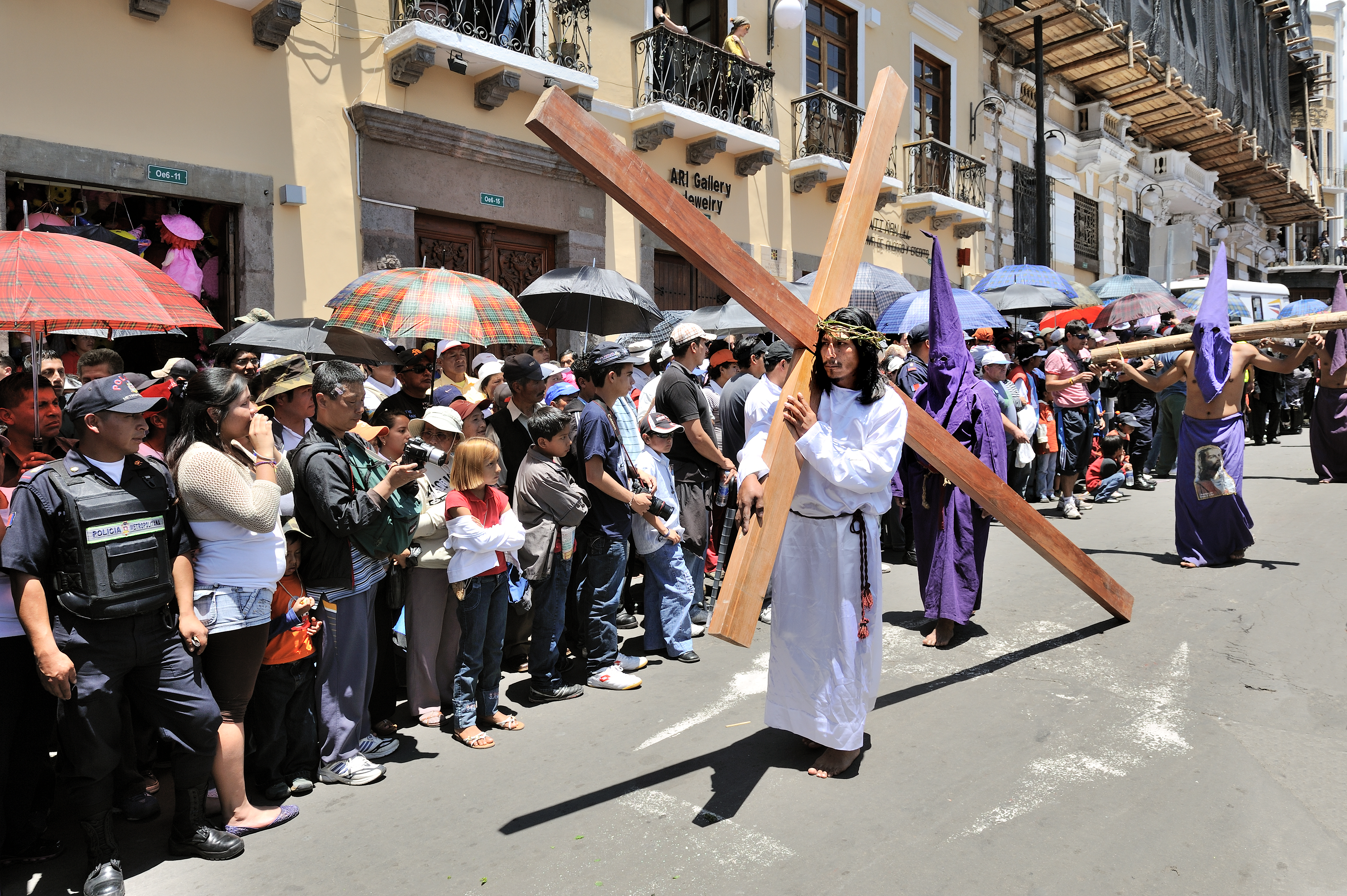
A Good Friday procession in Ecuador. The man is shown holding a cross, representing the one upon which Jesus was crucified.

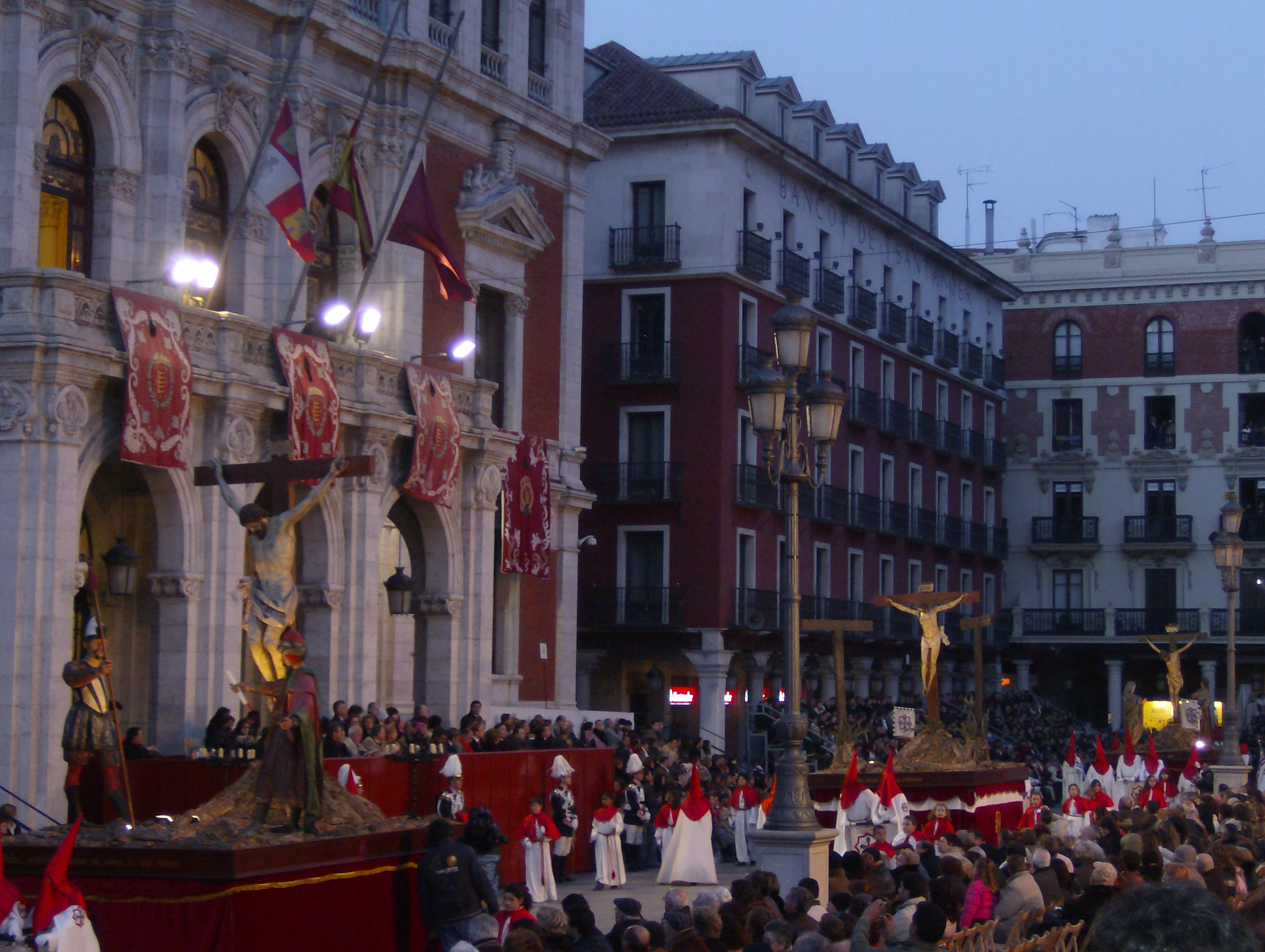
The General Good Friday Procession in Valladolid, Spain in front of the City Hall.

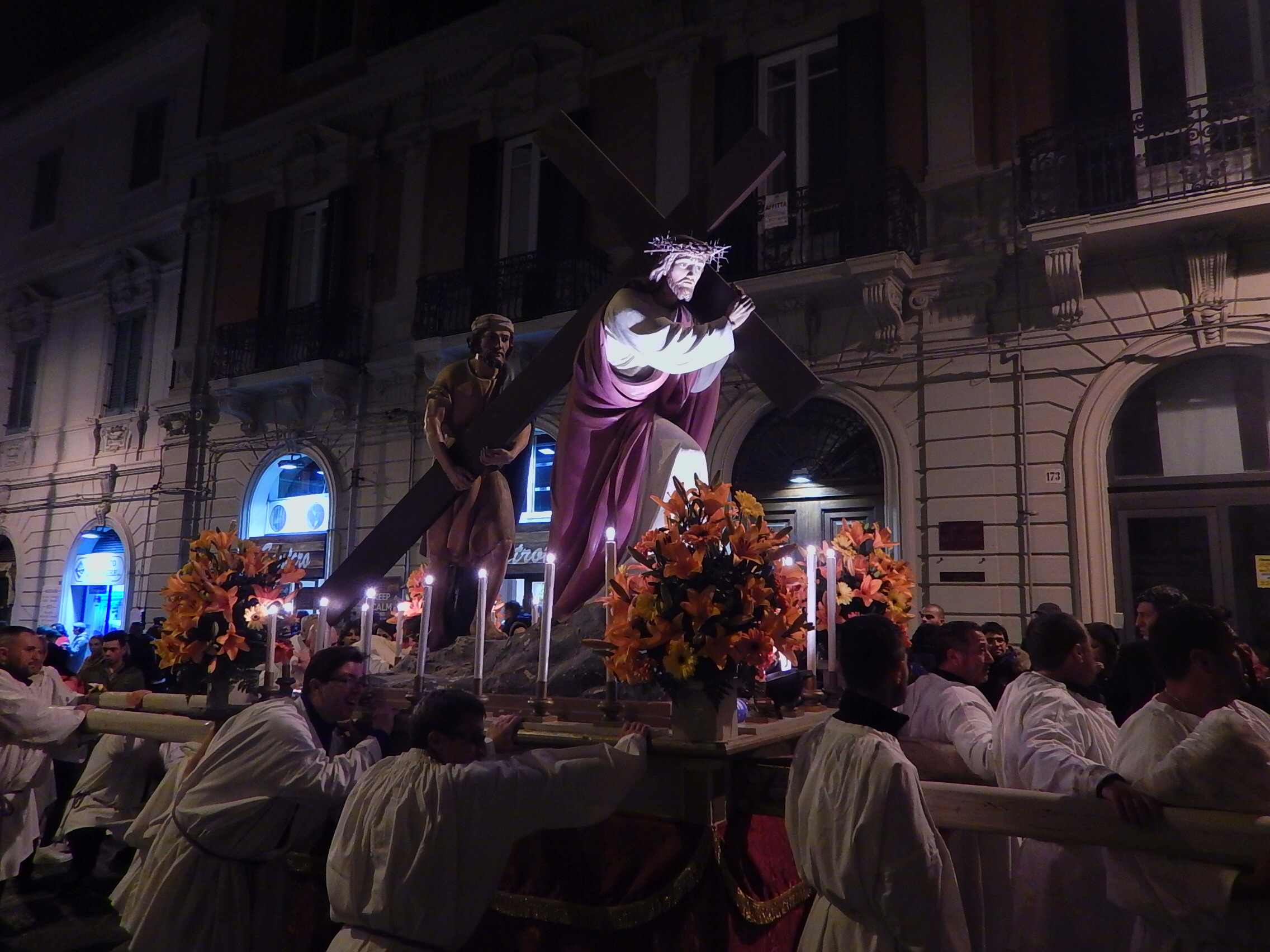
A traditional procession of the "Barette", showing the passion of Christ, the Good Friday in Messina, Sicily, Italy

Good Friday commemorates the crucifixion of Jesus and his subsequent death. Commemorations of often solemn and mournful, many denominations use Good Friday to perform the Stations of the Cross, or other commemorations of the Passion, either as a self-guided time of reflection and veneration or as a procession of statues or images of the stations.

The evening liturgical celebration on Holy Thursday begins the first of three days in the Easter Triduum, which continues in an atmosphere of liturgical mourning throughout the next day, in spite of the name "Good" given in English to the day.

For Catholic, Methodist, Lutheran, Reformed and Anglican Christians, Good Friday is widely observed as a fast day. A Handbook for the Discipline of Lent recommends the Lutheran guideline to "fast on Ash Wednesday and Good Friday with only one simple meal during the day, usually without meat". Western Catholic Church practice is to have only one full meal with, if needed, two small snacks that together do not make a full meal. The Anglican Communion defines fasting more generically as: "The amount of food eaten is reduced."

In some countries, such as Malta, Philippines, Italy, and Spain processions with statues representing the Passion of Christ are held.

- The church mourns for Christ's death, reveres the cross, and marvels at his life for his obedience until death.
- In the Catholic Church, the only sacraments celebrated are Penance and Anointing of the Sick. While there is no celebration of the Eucharist, Holy Communion is distributed to the faithful only in the Celebration of the Lord's Passion, but can be taken at any hour to the sick who are unable to attend this liturgy.
- Outside the afternoon liturgical celebration, the altar remains completely bare in Catholic churches, without altar cloth, candlesticks, or cross. In Lutheran and Methodist churches, the altar is usually draped in black.
- It is customary to empty the holy water fonts in preparation for the blessing of the water at the Easter Vigil.
- The Celebration of the Passion of the Lord takes place in the afternoon, ideally at three o'clock, but for pastoral reasons a later hour may be chosen.
- In the Catholic Church the colour of the vestments is red. The Lutheran Church, Methodist Church, and Presbyterian Church continue to use black, as was the practice of the Catholic Church until 1970. If a bishop celebrates, he wears a plain mitre.
- The Roman Rite liturgy consists of three parts: the Liturgy of the Word, the Veneration of the Cross, and Holy Communion.

Liturgy of the Word

Prostration of the celebrant before the altar.
The readings from Isaiah 53 (about the Suffering Servant) and the Epistle to the Hebrews are read.
The Passion narrative of the Gospel of John is sung or read, often divided between more than one singer or reader.
General Intercessions: The congregation prays for the Church, the Pope, the Jews, non-Christians, unbelievers and others.

Veneration of the Cross: A crucifix is solemnly unveiled before the congregation. The people venerate it on their knees. During this part, the "Reproaches" are often sung.
Distribution of Holy Communion: Hosts consecrated at the Mass of the previous day are distributed to the people. (Before the reform of Pope Pius XII, only the priest received Communion in the framework of what was called the "Mass of the Presanctified", which included the usual Offertory prayers, with the placing of wine in the chalice, but which omitted the Canon of the Mass.) The Good Friday liturgy is not a Mass, and in fact, celebration of Catholic Mass on Good Friday is forbidden. It is the Eucharist consecrated the evening before (Holy Thursday) that is distributed.

- Even if music is used in the Liturgy, it is not used to open and close the Liturgy, nor is there a formal recessional (closing procession).
- The solemnity and somberness of the occasion has encouraged the persistence over the centuries of liturgical forms without substantial modification.
- It was once customary in some countries, especially England, to place a veiled monstrance with the Blessed Sacrament or a cross in a Holy Sepulchre.
- If crucifixes were covered starting with the next to last Sunday in Lent, they are unveiled without ceremony after the Good Friday liturgy.

In some parishes of the Anglican Church, Catholic Church, Lutheran Church, and Methodist Church, the "Three Hours Devotion" is observed. This traditionally consists of a series of sermons, interspersed with singing, one on each of the Seven Last Words from the Cross, together with an introduction and a conclusion.

Another pious exercise carried out on Good Friday is that of the Stations of the Cross, either within the church or outside. The celebration at the Colosseum with participation by the pope has become a traditional event.

The Novena to the Divine Mercy begins on that day and lasts until the Saturday before the Feast of Mercy.

Moravians hold a Lovefeast on Good Friday as they receive Holy Communion on Maundy Thursday. Communicants of the Moravian Church practice the Good Friday tradition of cleaning gravestones in Moravian cemeteries.

=== Holy Saturday (Black Saturday) ===
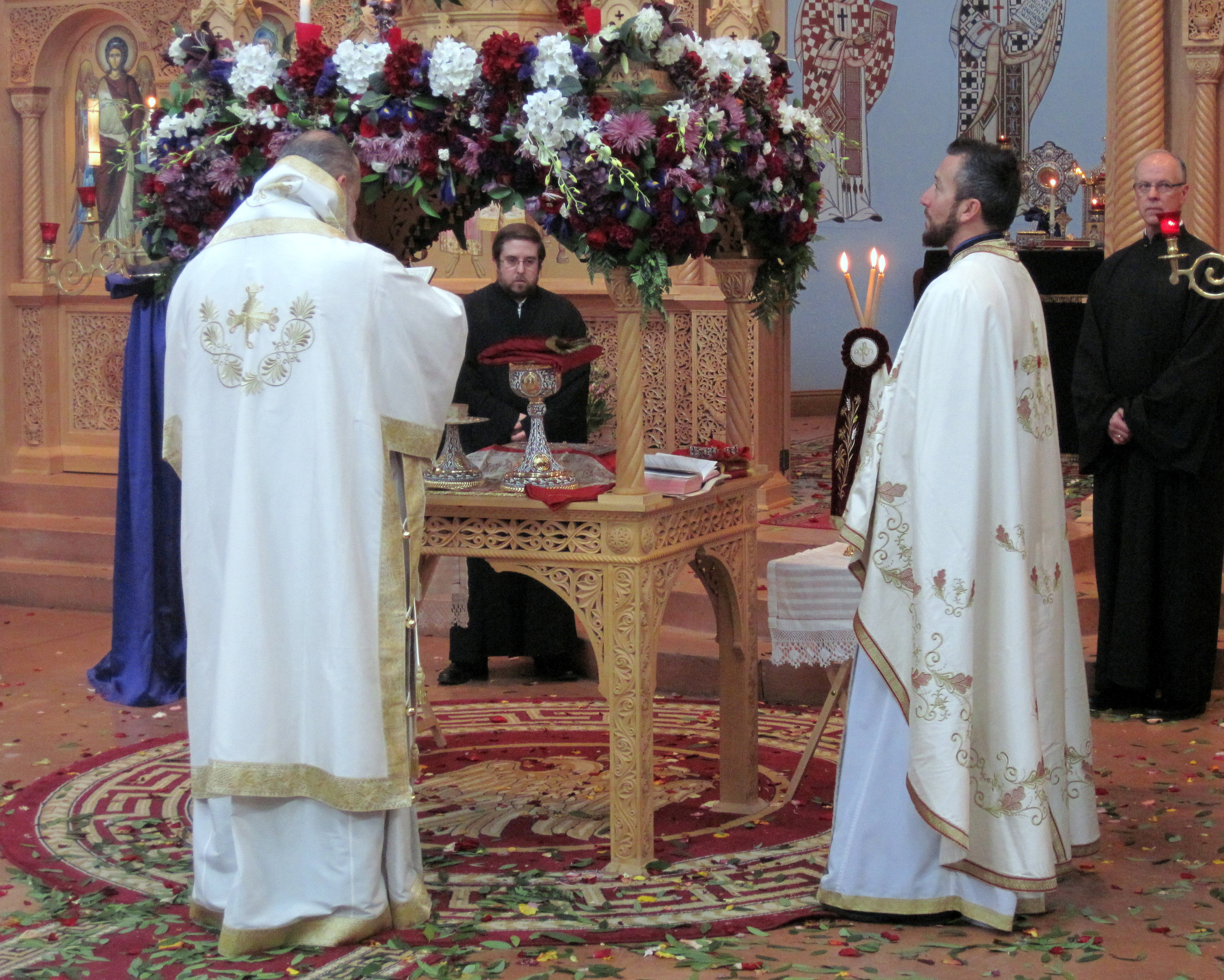
Divine Liturgy of Holy Saturday in a Greek Orthodox church in the United States

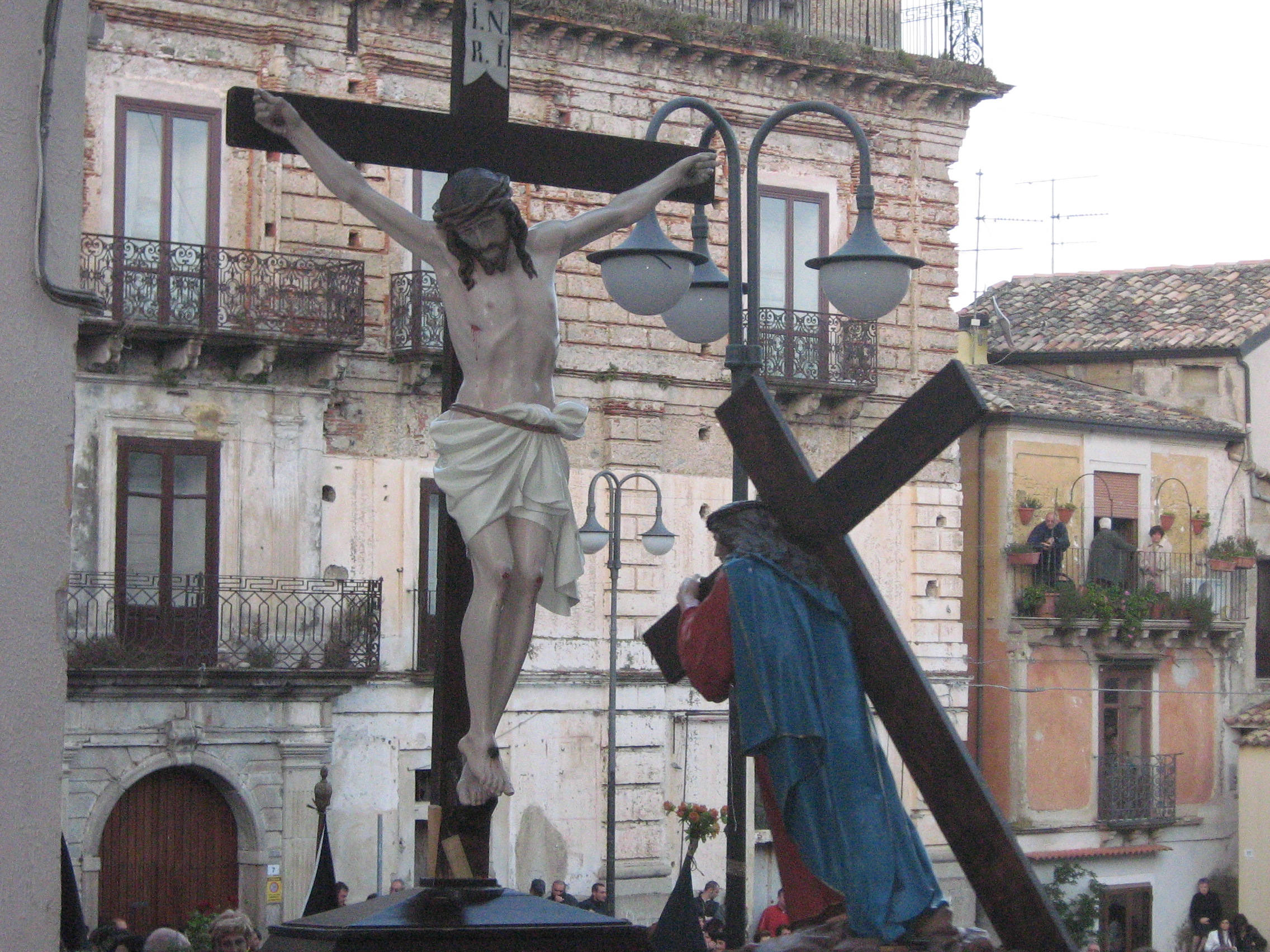
Holy Saturday in Caulonia, Italy

Holy Saturday is the day between the crucifixion of Jesus and his resurrection. As the Sabbath day, the Gospel accounts all note that Jesus was hurriedly buried in a cave tomb after his crucifixion, with the intent to finish proper embalming and burial ceremonies on Sunday, after the Sabbath had ended, as the Sabbath day prohibitions would have prevented observant Jews from completing a proper burial.

In the Catholic tradition after the Good Friday service, which represents the burial of Jesus, until the Easter Vigil on Saturday night, no mass takes place whatsoever on Holy Saturday. The celebration of the Easter Vigil liturgically belongs to Easter Sunday.

On Holy Saturday, the Church waits at the Lord's tomb, in prayer and fasting, meditating on his Passion and Death and on his Descent into Hell and awaiting his Resurrection. The Church abstains from the Sacrifice of the Mass, with the sacred table left bare, until after the solemn Vigil, that is, the anticipation by night of the Resurrection, when the time comes for paschal joys, the abundance of which overflows to occupy fifty days. Holy Communion may only be given on this day as Viaticum.

In some Anglican churches, including the Episcopal Church in the United States, there is provision for a simple liturgy of the word with readings commemorating the burial of Christ.

The doors of the empty tabernacle of the main altar are left open, to symbolise that Jesus Christ is gone. The lamp or candle usually situated next to the tabernacle denoting the presence of Christ is blown out.

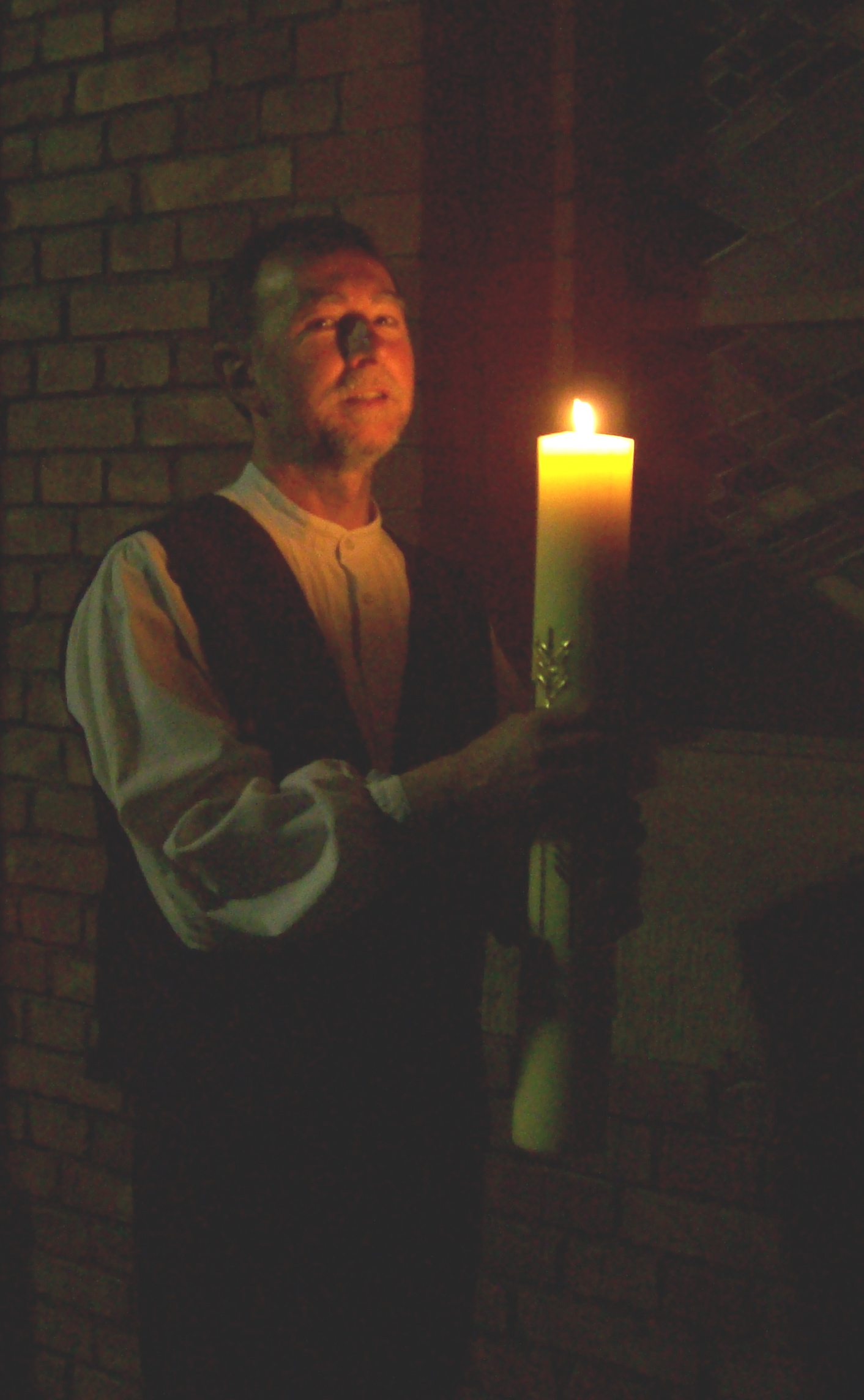
A Lutheran deacon holding the Paschal candle during the Easter Vigil

In the Catholic, Anglican, Lutheran, Methodist, and Presbyterian traditions, the Easter Vigil, one of the longest and most solemn of liturgical liturgies, lasts up to three or four hours, consists of four parts:

1. The Service of Light
2. The Liturgy of the Word
3. The Liturgy of Baptism: The sacraments of Baptism and Confirmation for new members of the Church and the Renewal of Baptismal Promises by the entire congregation.
4. Holy Eucharist

The Liturgy begins after sundown on Holy Saturday as the crowd gathers inside the unlit church. In the darkness (often in a side chapel of the church building or, preferably, outside the church), a new fire is kindled and blessed by the priest. This new fire symbolizes the light of salvation and hope that God brought into the world through Christ's Resurrection, dispelling the darkness of sin and death. From this fire is lit the Paschal candle, symbolizing the Light of Christ. This Paschal candle will be used throughout the Eastertide, remaining in the sanctuary of the Church or near the lectern, and is kept in the baptistry throughout the liturgical year so that in the celebrations of baptisms the candles of the baptized may be lit from the candle.

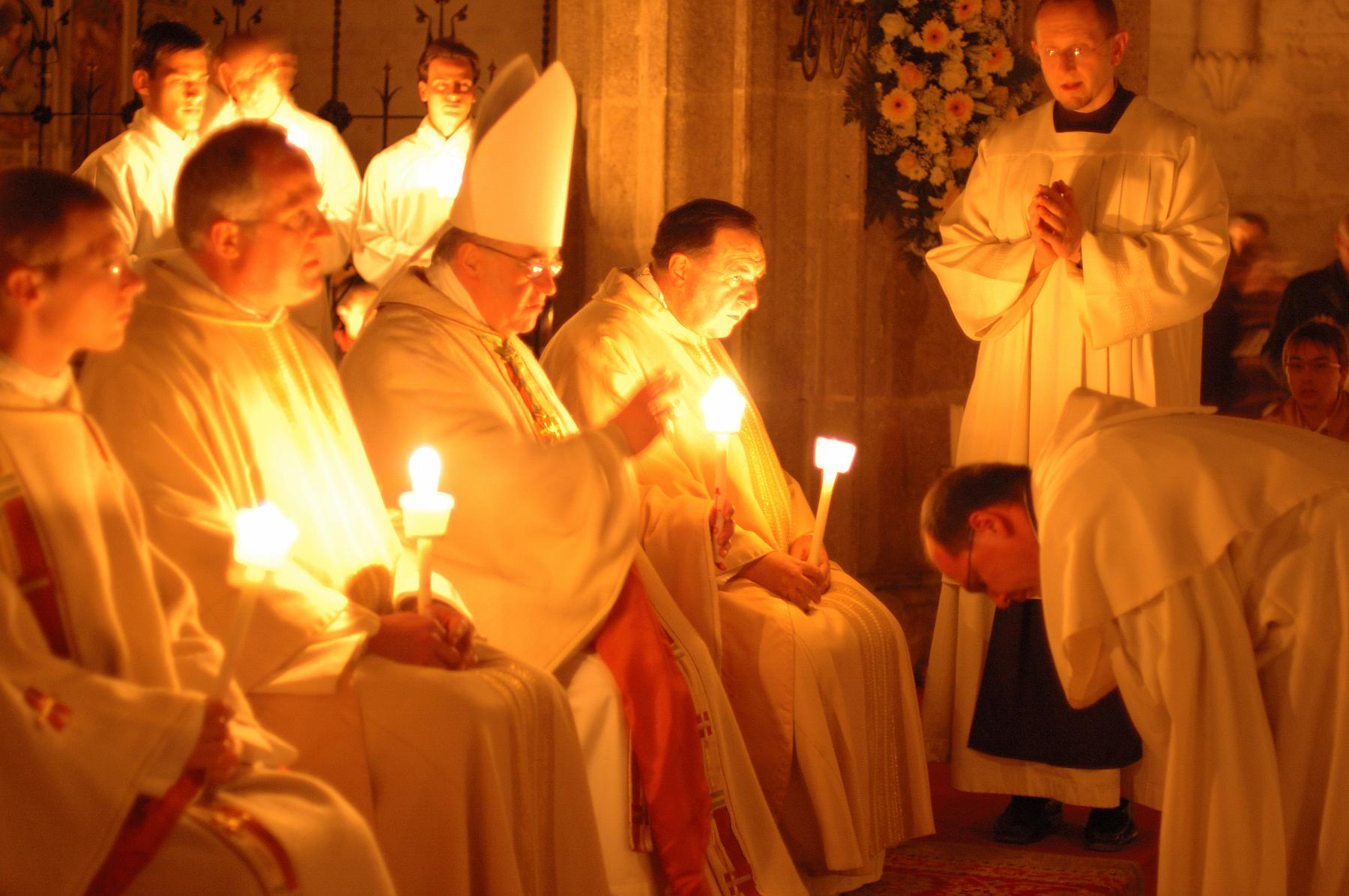
Candles lit for the Easter Vigil at Heiligenkreuz Abbey in Austria

The candles of those present are lit from the Paschal candle. As this symbolic "light of Christ" spreads throughout those gathered, the darkness is decreased. A deacon, or the priest if there is no deacon, carries the Paschal Candle at the head of the entrance procession and, at three points, stops and chants the proclamation "The Light of Christ" (until Easter 2011, the official English text was "Christ our Light"), to which the people respond "Thanks be to God". Once the procession concludes with the singing of the third proclamation, the lights throughout the church are lit, except for the altar candles. Then the deacon or a cantor chants the Exultet, also called the "Easter Proclamation". After that, the people extinguish their candles and sit down for the Liturgy of the Word.

The Liturgy of the Word includes nine readings, seven (or at least three) from the Old Testament, followed by two from the New (an Epistle and a Gospel). The reading of the crossing of the Red Sea (Ex 14) must never be omitted. Each Old Testament reading is followed by a psalm or canticle (such as Exodus 15:1–18 and a prayer relating what has been read to the Mystery of Christ.

After the Old Testament readings conclude, the Gloria in excelsis Deo, which has been suspended during Lent, is intoned and bells are rung. A reading from the Epistle to the Romans is proclaimed. The Alleluia is sung for the first time since the beginning of Lent. The Gospel of the Resurrection then follows, together with the Responsorial psalmody.

After the conclusion of the Liturgy of the Word, the water of the baptismal font is blessed and any catechumens or candidates for full communion are initiated into the church, by baptism or confirmation. After the celebration of these sacraments of initiation, the congregation renews their baptismal vows and receive the sprinkling of baptismal water. The general intercessions follow.

After the Liturgy of Baptism, the Liturgy of the Eucharist continues as usual. This is the first Mass of Easter Day. During the Eucharist, the newly baptised receive Holy Communion for the first time. According to the rubrics of the Missal, the Easter vigil "ends before the dawn on the Sunday".

=== Easter Day ===
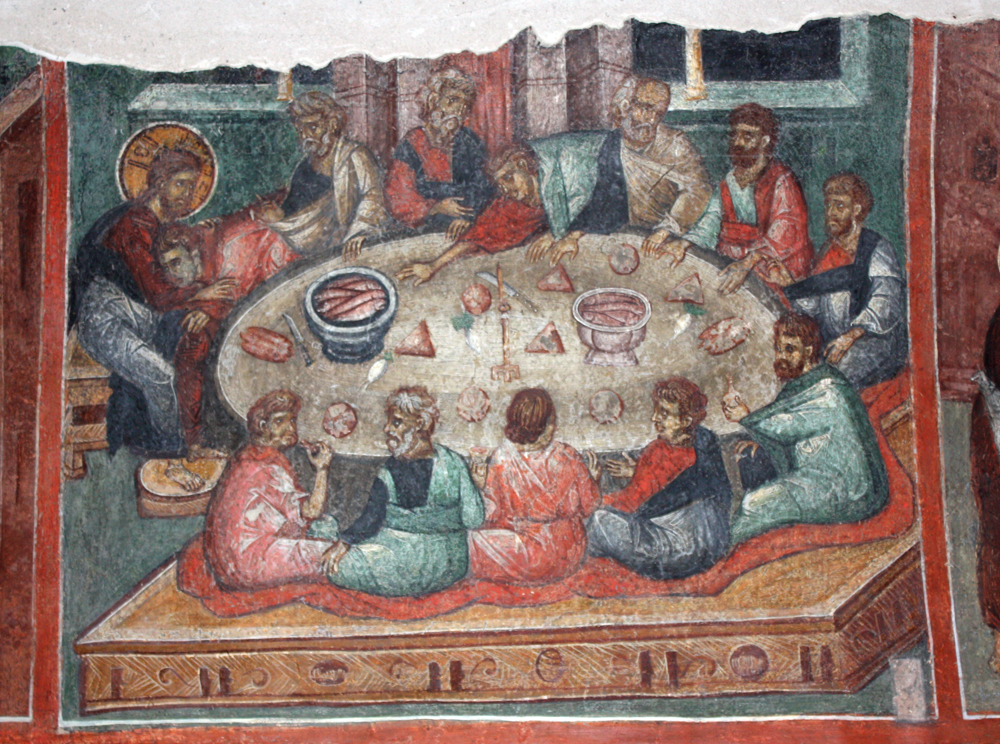
The Last Supper celebrated by Jesus and his disciples. The early Christians, too, would have celebrated this meal to commemorate Jesus's death and subsequent resurrection.

Easter Day (or Easter Sunday), which immediately follows Holy Week and begins with the Easter Vigil, is the great feast day and apogee of the Christian liturgical year: on this day the Resurrection of Jesus Christ is celebrated. It is the first day of the new season of the Great Fifty Days, or Eastertide, which runs from Easter Day to Pentecost Sunday. The Resurrection of Christ on Easter Day is the main reason why Christians keep every Sunday as the primary day of religious observance.

=== Plenary indulgence ===
In the Roman Catholic Church, plenary indulgence is granted once a day by the 1999 Enchiridion Indulgentiarum, in the following cases:

1. Adoration of the Blessed Sacrament for at least one half hour;
2. The pious exercise of the Way of the Cross;
3. Recitation of the Marian Rosary or of the hymn Akathistos, in church or an oratory; or in a family, a religious community, or a sodality of the faithful or, in general, when several of the faithful are gathered for any good purpose;
4. The devout reading or listening to the Sacred Scriptures for at least a half an hour.

=== Holy Week observances ===
Cities famous for their Holy Week processions include:

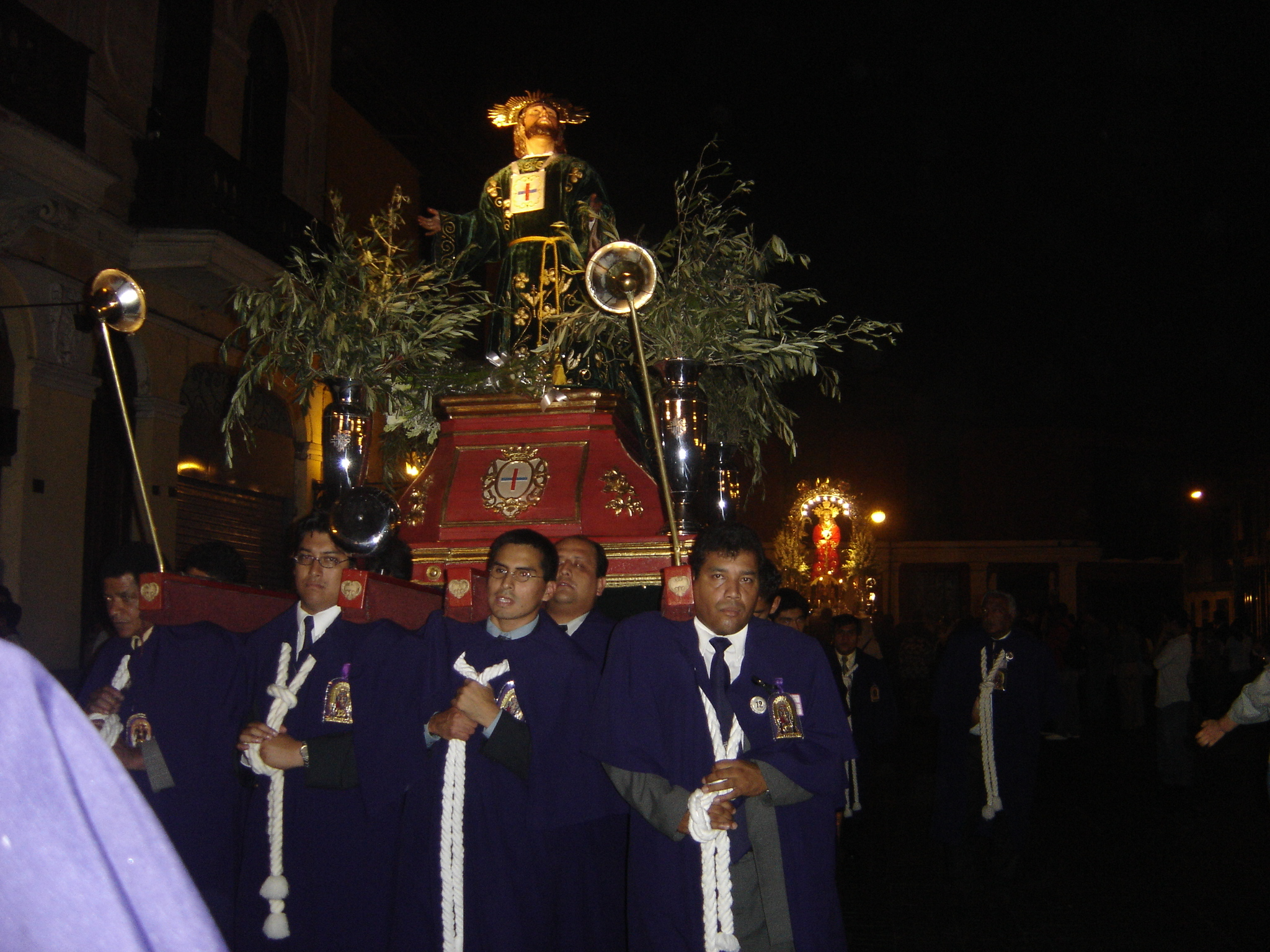
A Holy Monday Procession in Lima, Peru

Country	City
Colombia	Santa Cruz de Mompox; Popayán; Tunja; Pamplona
Costa Rica	San José; Heredia; San Rafael de Oreamuno
India	Mumbai; Delhi; Chennai; Kolkata Kochi; Vasai-Virar
Guatemala	Holy Week processions in Guatemala; Antigua Guatemala; Guatemala City
Honduras	Comayagua; Tegucigalpa
Ecuador	Quito
El Salvador	Sonsonate
Indonesia	Larantuka
Mexico	Holy Week in Mexico; Iztapalapa
Nicaragua	Managua; Granada; León
Philippines	List: Angono, Rizal; Antipolo; Baguio; Baliuag, Bulacan; Bantayan Island; Cebu City; Capas, Tarlac; Guagua, Pampanga; Iloilo City; Legazpi; Oas, Albay; Makati; Manila; Manaoag, Pangasinan; Meycauayan; Mogpog, Marinduque; Morong, Rizal; Naga, Camarines Sur; Paete, Laguna; Parañaque; San Pedro, Laguna; San Pablo, Laguna; San Fernando, Pampanga; Santa Rita, Pampanga; Sasmuan, Pampanga; Vigan; Taguig; Las Piñas; Olongapo City; Zambales
Peru	Ayacucho; Cusco; Huaraz; Tarma
Spain	List: León; Seville; Valladolid; Zamora; Jerez de la Frontera; Palencia; Málaga; Cartagena; Cádiz; Murcia; Alicante; Ferrol; Ávila
Venezuela	Tacarigua de Mamporal; Guatire; Caracas; Villa de Cura
Vietnam	Tuần Thánh

==== Brazil ====
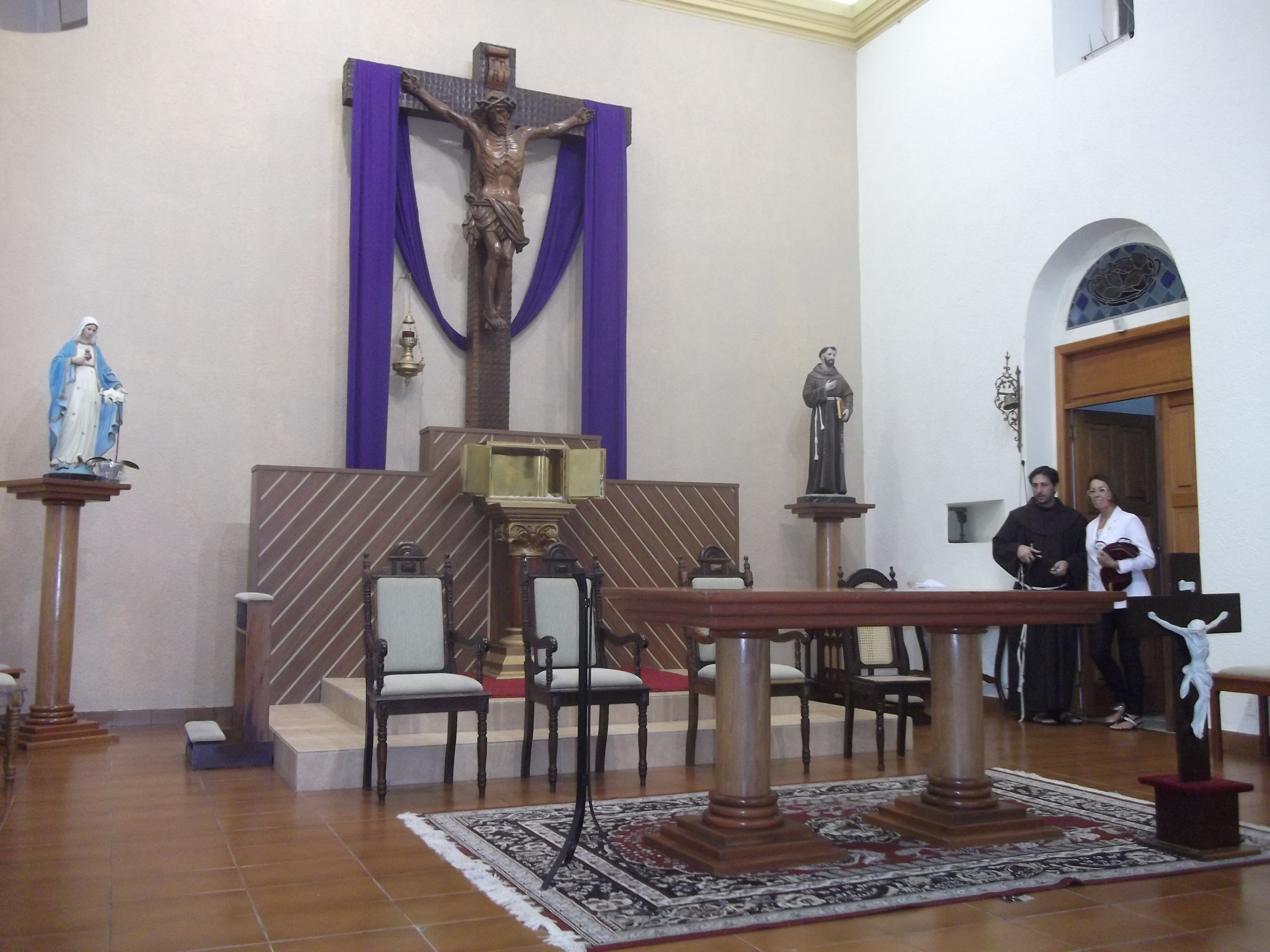
A church in Florianópolis, Brazil, preparated for the Good Friday celebrations.

Holy Week has developed into one of Brazil's main symbols of community identity, more specifically in the southern town of Campanha. The Campanha Holy Week begins on the Monday evening with the Procession of the Deposit. The figure of Our Lord of the Stations, representing the blood-stained Jesus carrying the cross, is brought from the church in a large black box and displayed in the main square. Then it is solemnly taken to the church following a band and a procession of people.

Outside the church, a sermon is delivered on the Easter story of Jesus Christ's death and resurrection. After the sermon, a choir inside the open doors of the church sings the Miserere by Manoel Dias de Oliveria, while the black box is brought inside the church, and people come in to kiss the human-sized figure of Christ. Processions on Tuesday and Wednesday stop at different chapels at each of which a large painting portrays episodes of the Way of the Cross and a related hymn is sung at each. On Thursday morning the Chrism Mass is celebrated, with a blessing of the oils.

Good Friday afternoon ceremonies are followed by the week's main spectacle of the Taking Down from the Cross in front of the cathedral followed by the Funeral Procession of Our Dead Lord. The drama shows Christ being taken from the cross and placed in a coffin, which is then taken around to the accompaniment of the "Song of Veronica". On Saturday morning a drama is performed by the youth.

The following night, the Paschal Vigil is celebrated, and the streets are transformed into a beautiful array of intricate, colorful carpets to prepare for the following day. Easter Sunday begins before sunrise with the singing of the choir and band performances to celebrate the resurrection of Christ. Bells and fireworks are followed by a Mass that ends with the "Hallelujah Chorus".

==== Guatemala ====
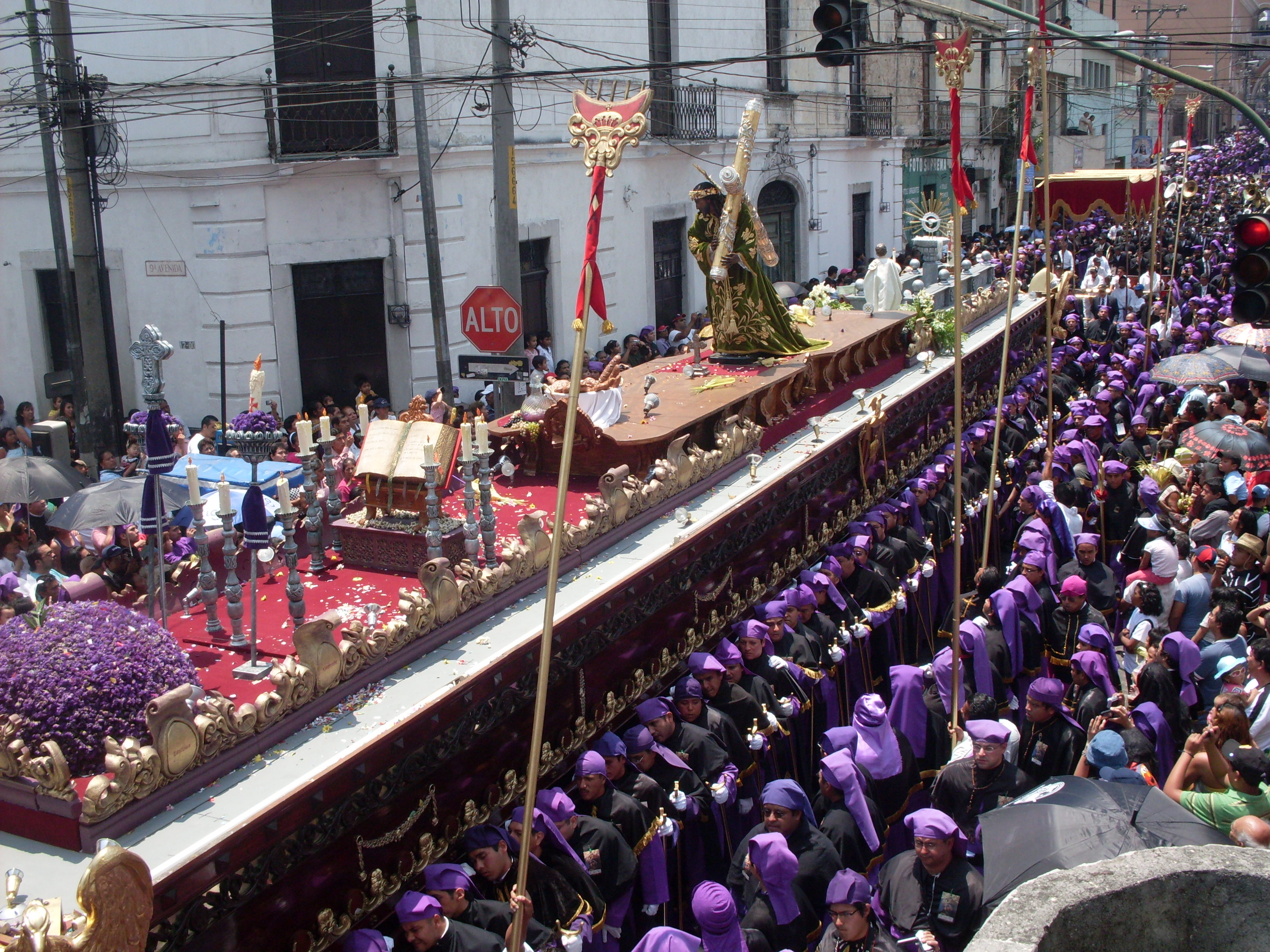
Jesús de los Milagros procession, San José Church, Palm Sunday in Guatemala City

Holy Week in Guatemala incorporates processions with images of saints carried on huge wooden platforms. The heavy andas are held by the locals, both men and women, who are frequently in purple robes. The procession is led by a man holding a container of incense accompanied by a small horn and flute band. Intricate carpets (alfombras) line the streets during the week's celebration. Easter processions begin at sunrise and everyone comes to join the festivities.

In Amatenango, the figure of Judas, who betrayed Christ has been the main point of focus during the Mayan Holy Week. The priest calls Judas the "killer of Christ". The figure used to be beaten after the Crucifixion performance on Good Friday, but is now treated more calmly.

==== Honduras ====
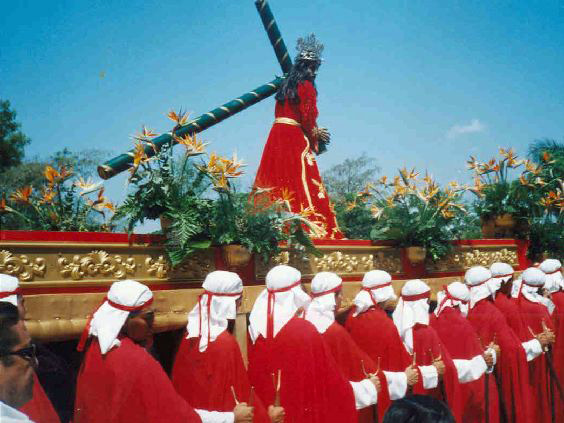
Holy Week in Comayagua, Honduras.

The holiday is celebrated annually in Comayagua. The tradition its still practiced in the same way as when it was introduced in the 16th century by the Spanish conquerors. Every Holy Week people make the famous Alfombras de Aserrín, colored carpets made of wood dust that represent scenes from the life and death of Jesus Christ of the Virgin Mary and other saints or the Holy spirit.

Holy Week is also widely celebrated in Tegucigalpa following similar traditions of Comayagua, mostly in the historic center of the city. Similar to Guatemala, the Honduran Holy Week incorporates processions with images of saints carried on huge wooden platforms. In other communities, such as Gracias Lempira, the holiday is still widely celebrated.

==== Italy ====
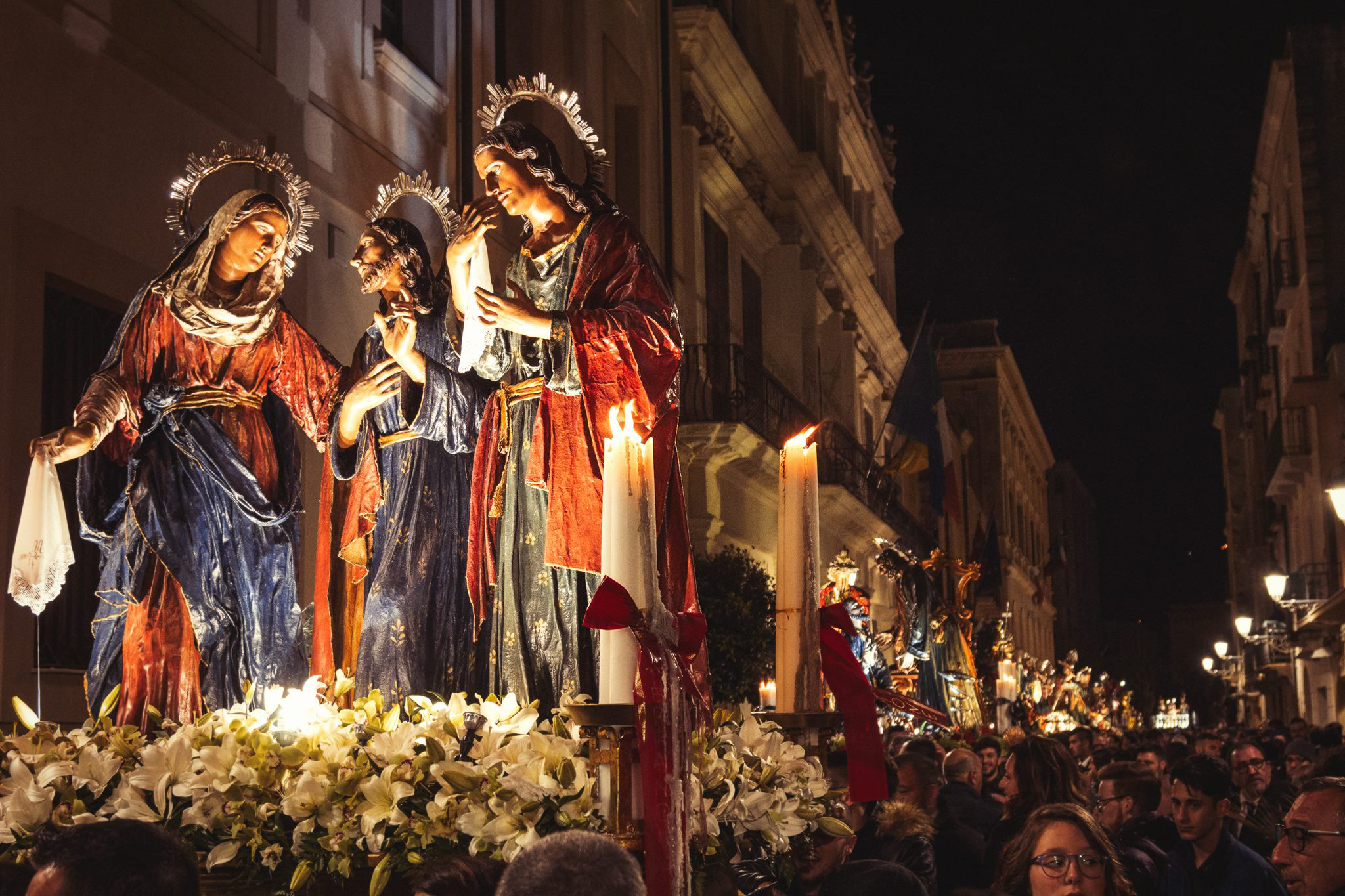
The "Misteri", the Holy Week procession in Trapani

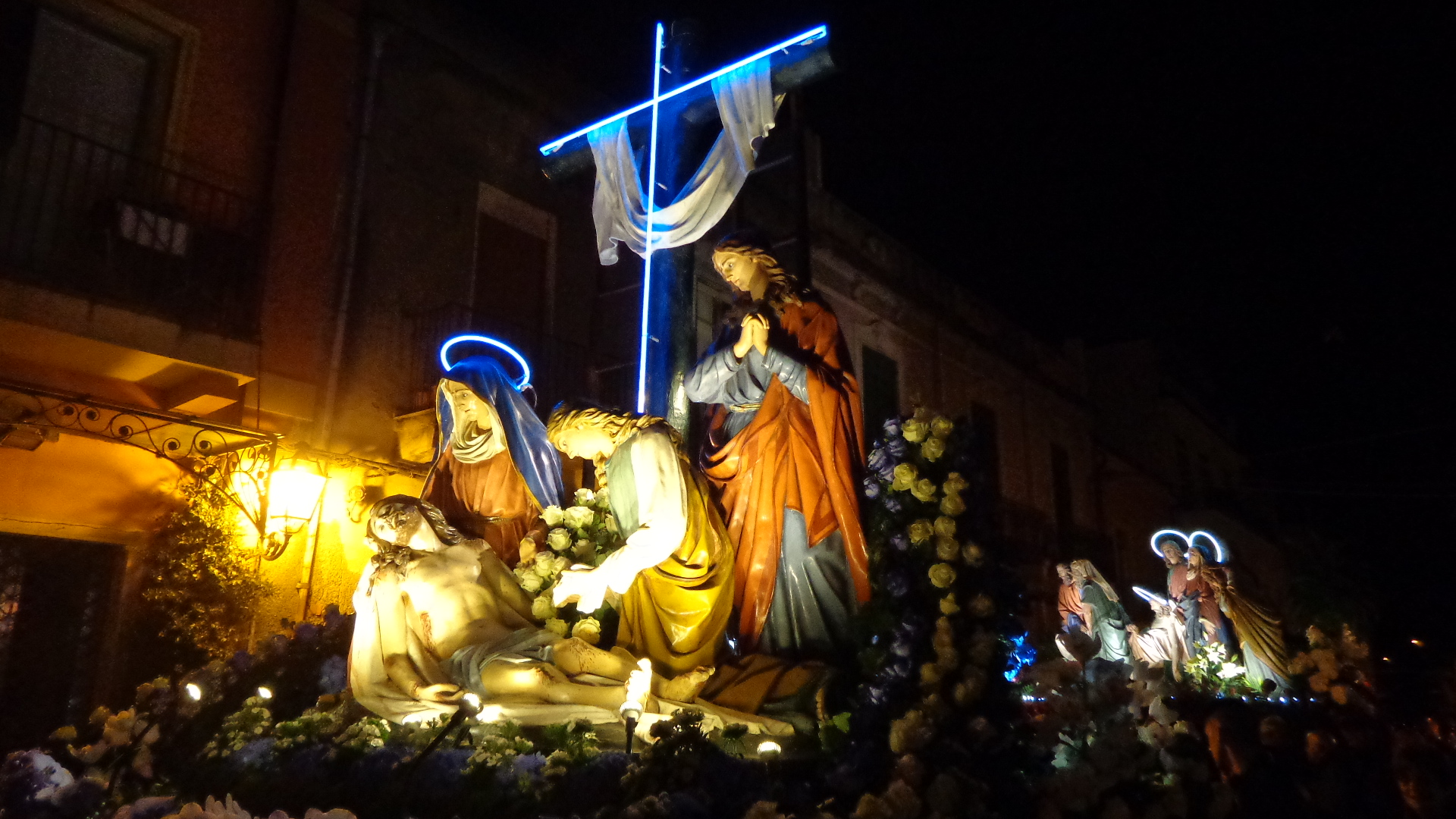
Holy Week in Barcellona Pozzo di Gotto, Italy

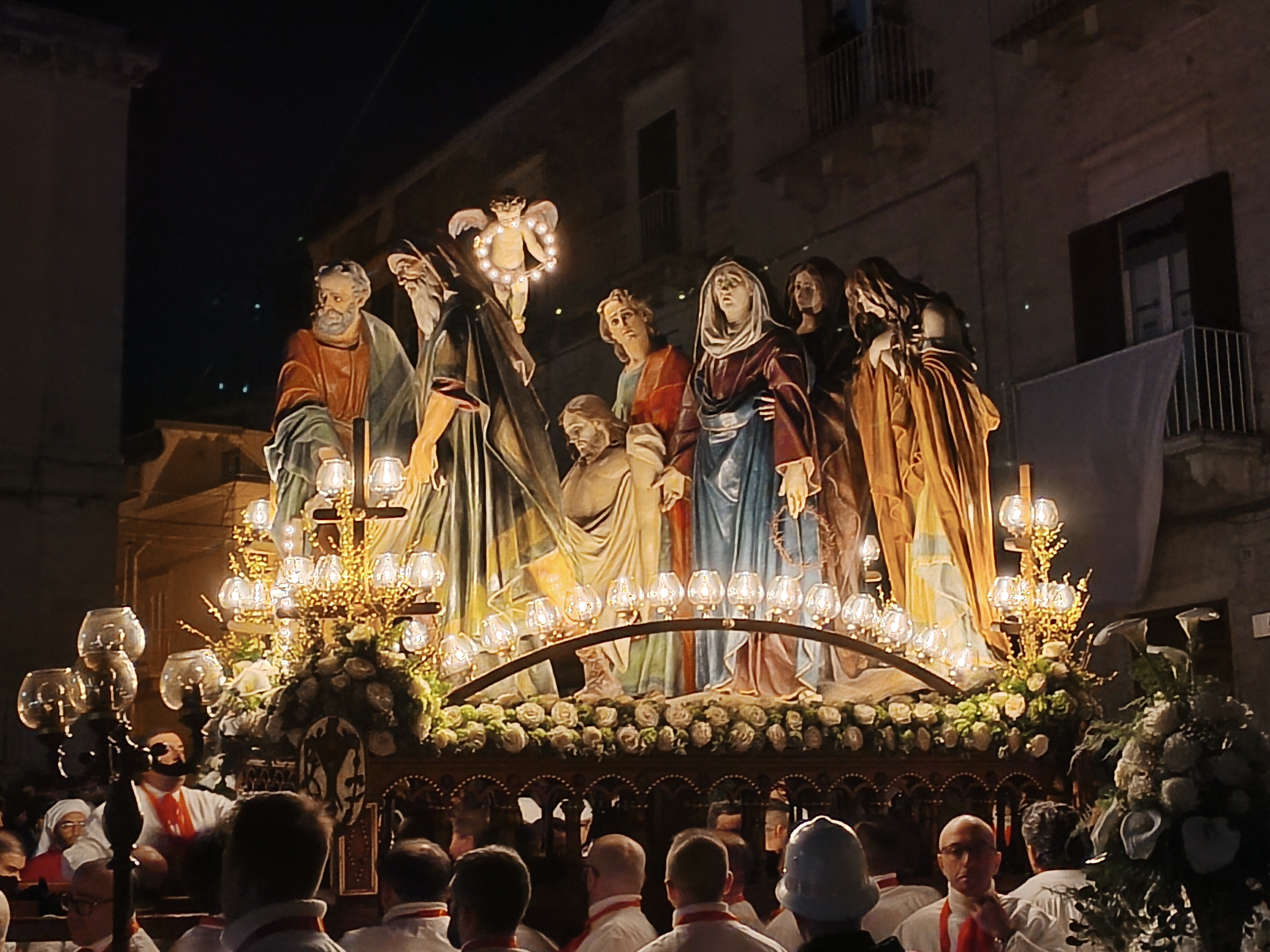
Holy Week in Ruvo di Puglia, Italy

Easter in Italy (Italian: Pasqua, pronounced [ˈpaskwa]) is one of the country's major holidays. Holy Week (Italian: Settimana santa, pronounced [settiˈmaːna ˈsanta]) is observed in parts of Southern Italy, notably Sicily. The most famous is the Holy Week of Trapani, culminating in the Processione dei Misteri di Trapani or simply the Misteri di Trapani (in English the Procession of the Mysteries of Trapani or the Mysteries of Trapani). This is a day-long passion procession featuring 20 floats of lifelike sculptures made of wood, canvas and glue. These sculptures are of individual scenes of the events of the Passion, a passion play at the centre and the culmination of the Holy Week in Trapani. The Misteri are amongst the oldest continuously running religious events in Europe, having been played every Good Friday since before the Easter of 1612, and running for at least 16 continuous hours, but occasionally well beyond 24 hours, are the longest religious festivals in Sicily and in Italy.

Holy Weeks worthy of note in Italy are also the Holy Week in Barcellona Pozzo di Gotto and the Holy Week in Ruvo di Puglia. The Holy Week in Barcellona Pozzo di Gotto is rooted in the history of Spanish Sicily (1516–1713) when the entire island subject to the domination of Crown of Aragon, combined with the Kingdom of Naples passes under the jurisdiction of the Crown of Spain. In 1571 "Pozzogottesi" obtained from the Grand Court of the Archbishop of Messina permission to elect their chaplain stationed in Saint Vitus no longer depend from the Archpriest of Milazzo. The first procession is carried out in 1621 as a movement of protest against the Jurors of the city of Milazzo, under whose jurisdiction Pozzo di Gotto depended politically and physically by providing a distant village and as a vow and promise to break the bond of subordination constraint which was permanently discontinued on the 22 May 1639.

The rites of the Holy Week in Ruvo di Puglia are the main event that takes place in the Apulian town. Folklore and sacred or secular traditions, typical of the ruvestine tradition, represent a great attraction for tourists from neighboring cities and the rest of Italy and Europe, and have been included by the I.D.E.A. among the events of the intangible heritage of Italy. The proof of the existence of the first Ruvestines confraternities can be found in the polyptych, a Byzantine work signed Z. T., depicting the Madonna with Child and confreres in which the inscription "Hoc opus fieri fec(e)runt, confratres san(c)ti Cleti, anno salut(i)s 1537" and preserved in the church of Purgatory, in the left aisle, the one dedicated to Saint Anacletus.

==== Malta ====
The Holy Week commemorations reach their paramount on Good Friday as the Catholic Church celebrates the passion of Jesus. Solemn celebrations take place in all churches together with processions in different villages around Malta and Gozo. During the celebration, the narrative of the passion is read in some localities. The Cross follows a significant Way of Jesus. Good Friday processions take place in Birgu, Bormla, Għaxaq, Luqa, Mosta, Naxxar, Paola, Qormi, Rabat, Senglea, Valletta, Żebbuġ and Żejtun. Processions in Gozo will be in Nadur, Victoria, Xagħra Xewkija, and Żebbuġ.

==== Mexico and United States: Yaqui Indians ====
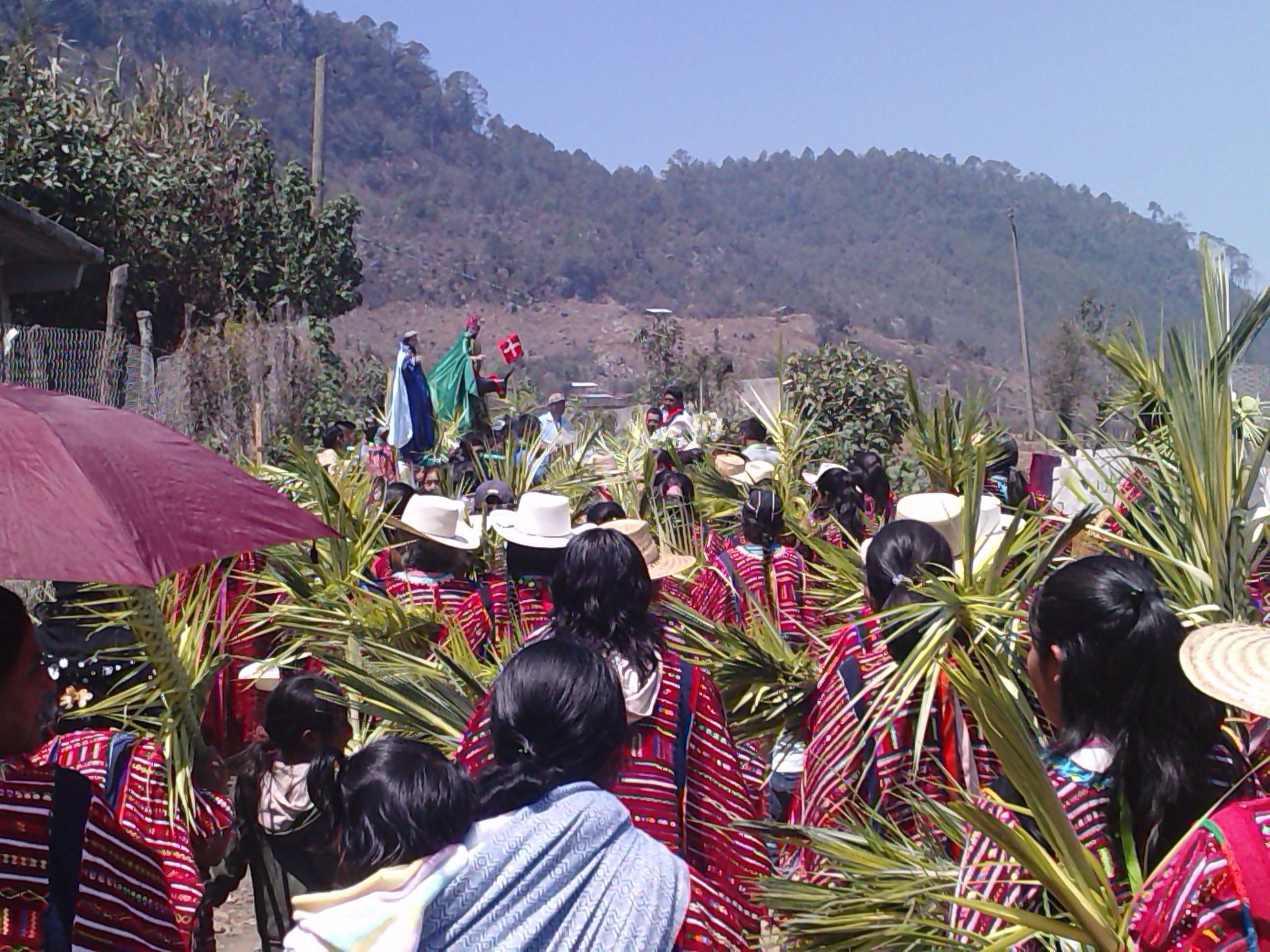
Holy Week in Mexico

Yaqui Holy Week is both ritualistic and dramaturgic in its celebrations. The rituals date back to the early seventeenth century, at the time of pioneering Jesuit priest. The major event of the Yaqui Indians during Holy Week occurs on Wednesday evening in which people arrive at the church on horseback and begin to crawl and dance naked on the floor. Light begins to go out and people begin the whipping, screaming and crying to the sound of traditional music of sacrifice. In Tucson, dancers are used to wear dark coats and black hide masks, instead of blankets.

Children in white robes with blue painted faces and a dark hooded figure, symbolizing the betrayer of Christ, join the Thursday morning procession to the church. There they promise to serve God for the next three or five years, until their eyes start to bleed just like Christ's would. That night, there is a symbolic search for Jesus when the "Pharisees" visit various crosses in the streets and capture the "old man" (symbolic Jesus). On Friday a member of the church who volunteers to represent Jesus is beaten and buried for two days. On Saturday, an image of Jesus Christ's betrayer, Judas Iscariot, and takes place an apotropaic battle destroying the evil which has been accumulated in the town during the next year. Sunday celebrates Christ's resurrection filled with beautiful flowers and fireworks, while the volunteer rises from where he was buried. A dance drama is performed enacting evil being defeated by good.

==== Philippines ====
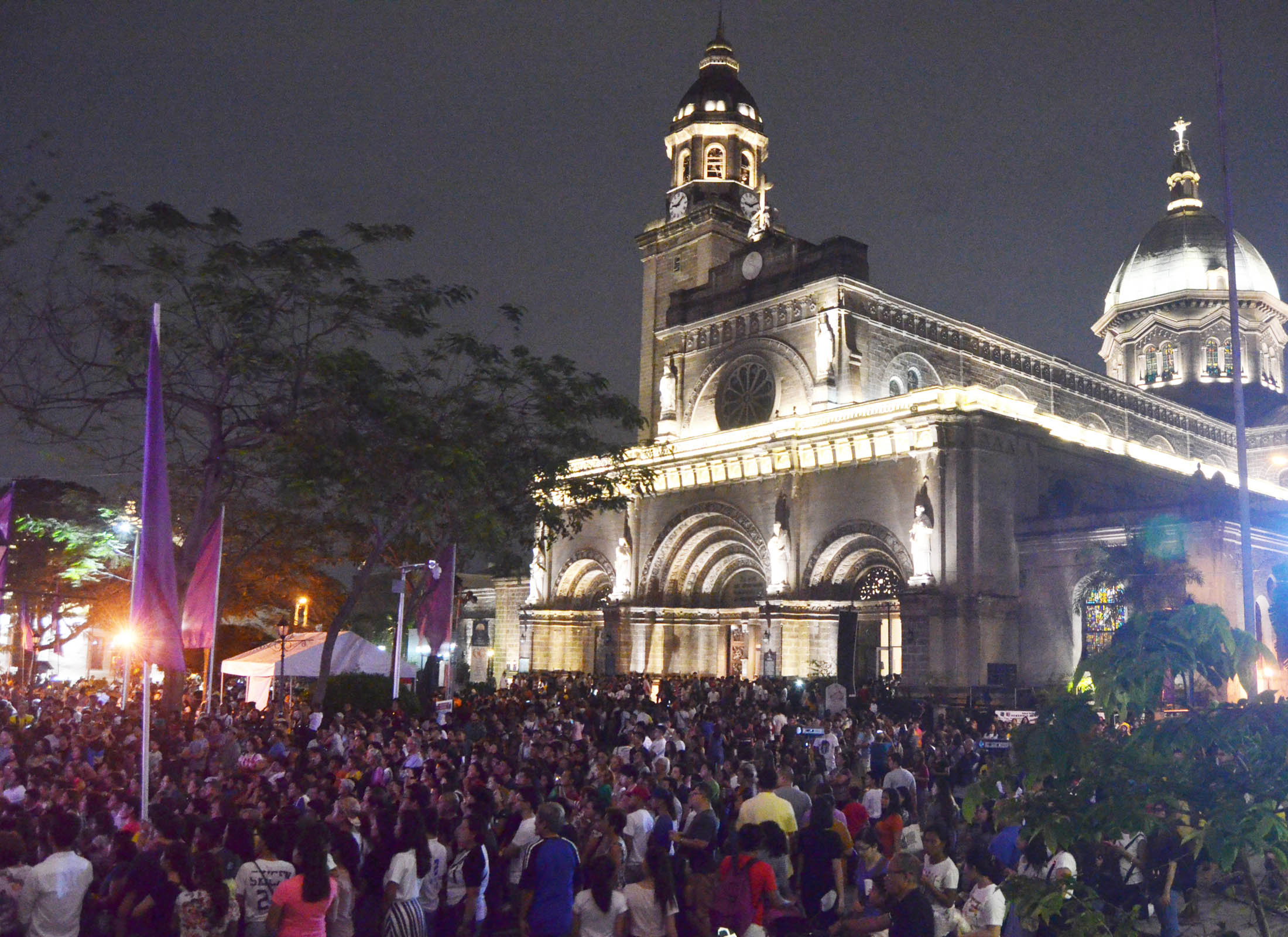
Catholic devotees flock to Manila Cathedral on March 29, 2018, for the traditional Visita Iglesia.

In the predominantly Catholic Philippines, Maundy Thursday and Good Friday are national holidays; work is suspended in government offices and private businesses. Most stores are closed and most people in the cities return to their home provinces to commemorate Holy Week in their home town.

Holy Week is commemorated with street processions featuring wheeled carrozas or floats carrying various icons, the Way of the Cross, and a Passion play called the Senákulo In some communities (most famously in San Fernando, Pampanga), the processions include devotees who self-flagellate and sometimes even have themselves nailed to crosses as expressions of penance. After 15:00 PHT on Good Friday (the time at which Jesus is traditionally believed to have died), noise is discouraged, many radio stations and television stations close down (some broadcast religious programming, with non-Catholic owned stations continuing broadcast), and the faithful are urged to keep a solemn and prayerful disposition through to Easter Sunday.

At Mass on Palm Sunday, Catholics carry "palaspás" or palm leaves to be blessed by the priest. Many Filipinos bring home the palm leaves after the Mass and place these above their front doors or their windows, believing that doing so can ward off evil spirits. Holy Monday marks the beginning of the Pabasa (Tagalog, "reading"), the marathon chanting of the Pasyón, a poem narrating Jesus Christ's life and death. The chanting, which continues day and night without interruption, lasts as long as two straight days.

One of the most important Holy Week traditions in the Philippines is the Visita Iglesia (Spanish for "church visit"). On Maundy Thursday, the faithful visit seven churches to pray the Stations of the Cross, and in the evenings, pray in front of each church's Altar of Repose.

The last Mass before Easter is also celebrated on Maundy Thursday, usually including a reenactment of the Washing of the Feet of the Apostles. This Mass is followed by the procession of the Blessed Sacrament to be transferred to the Altar of Repose. Good Friday in the Philippines is commemorated with street processions, the Way of the Cross, the commemoration of the Seven last words and a Passion play called the Senakulo.

Easter Day is marked with joyous celebration, the first being the dawn Salubong rite, wherein statues of Jesus and Mary are brought in procession together to meet, imagining the first reunion of Jesus and his mother Mary after the Resurrection. This is followed by the joyous Easter Mass. Most Catholic communities across the Philippines practice this, though it is more popularly celebrated in the provinces. The rite, originally called the encuentro, was introduced by Spanish priests during the colonial era.

==== Spain ====
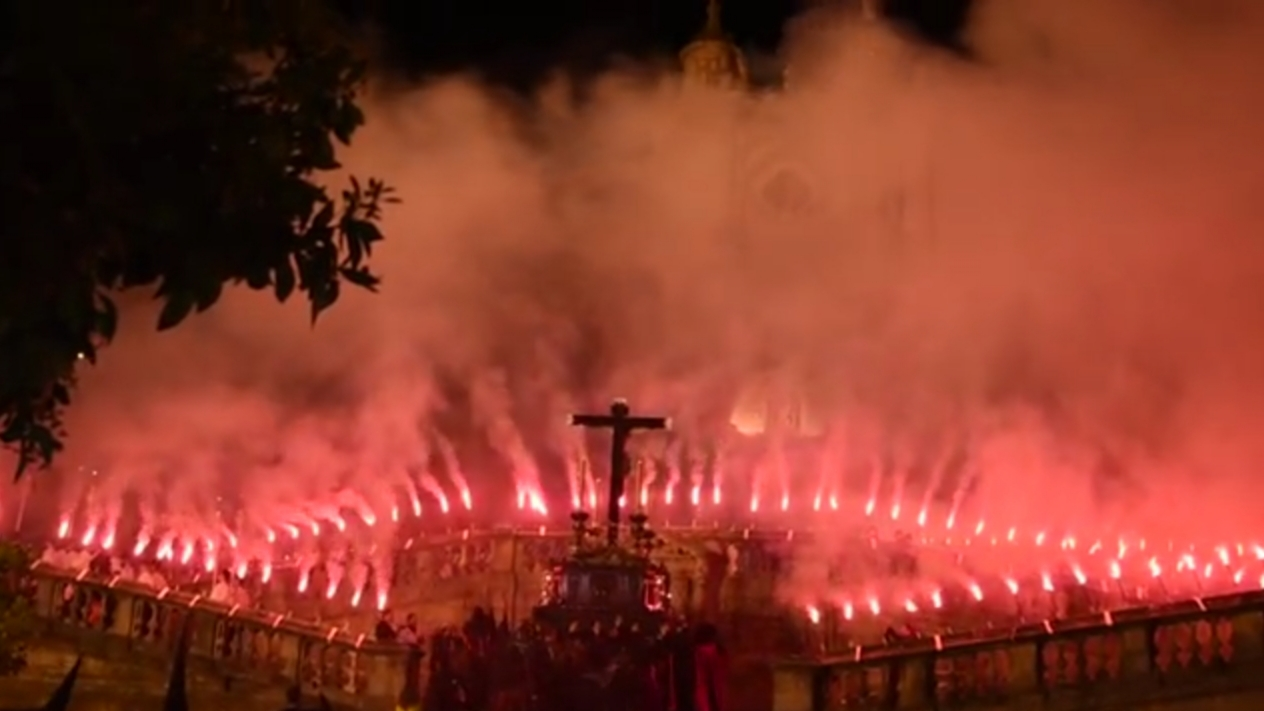
Holy Week in Jerez de la Frontera, Spain

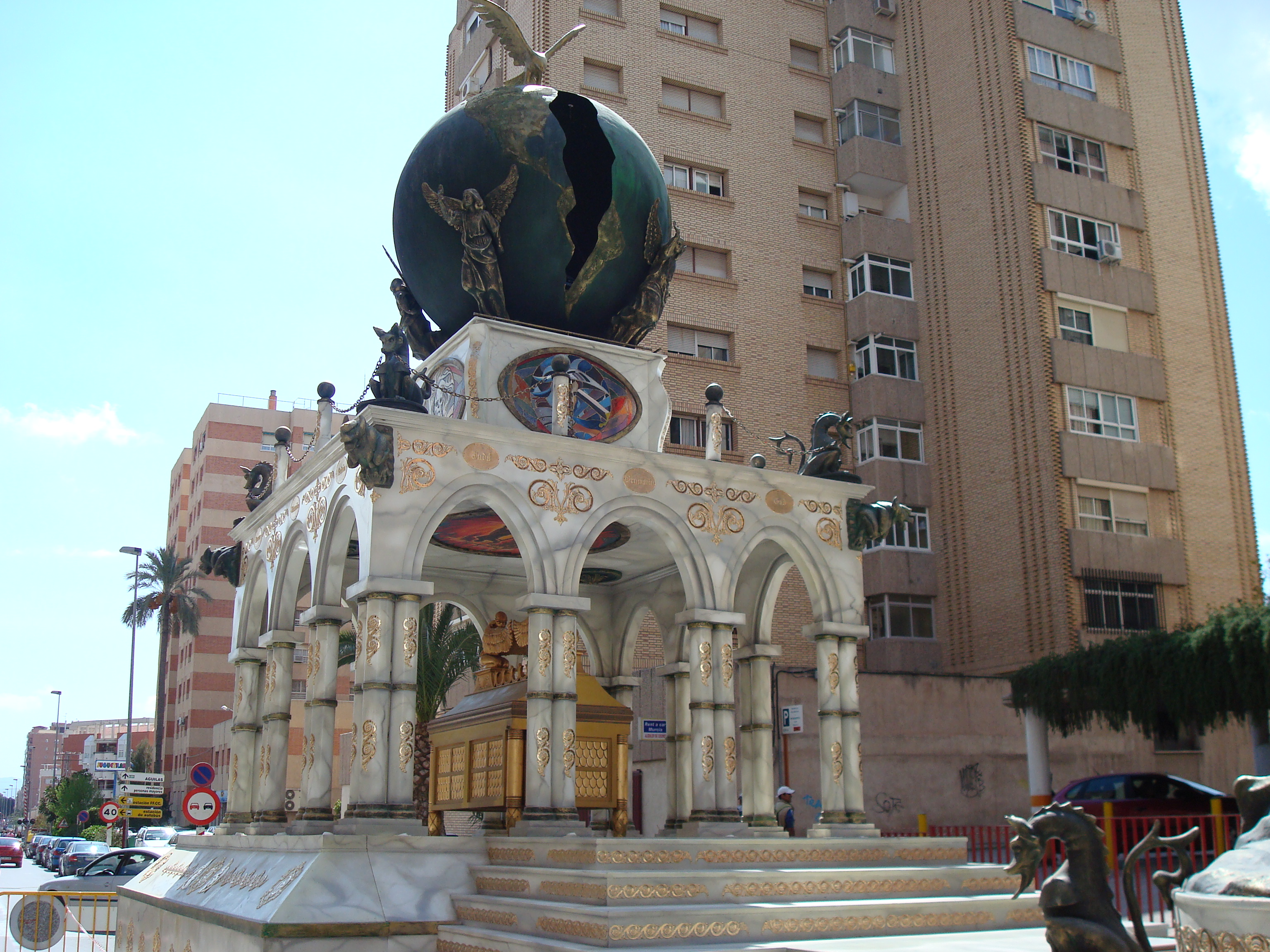
Holy week in Lorca, Spain

Among other cities Lorca, Granada, Murcia, Málaga, Valladolid, Palencia, Jerez de la Frontera, Zamora, León or Ferrol hold elaborate processions for Holy Week. A tradition dating from medieval times that has spread to other cities in Andalusia, the "Semana Santa en Sevilla" is notable for featuring the procession of "pasos", lifelike wood or plaster sculptures of individual scenes of the events that happened between Jesus Christ's arrest and his burial, or images of the Virgin Mary showing grief for the torture and killing of her son. Holy week processions in Seville include marching bands that escort the pasos.

In Málaga, the lifelike wooden or plaster sculptures are called "tronos" and they are carried through the streets by "costaleros" (Translated literally as "sack men", because of the costal, a sack-like cloth that they wear over their neck, to soften the burden). These pasos and tronos are physically carried on their necks or "braceros" (this name is popular in León). The paso can weigh up to five metric tonnes. In front of them walk the penitentes, dressed in long purple robes, often with pointed hats, followed by women in black carrying candles for up to 11 hours. The pasos are set up and maintained by hermandades and cofradías, religious brotherhoods, common to a specific area of the city, who precede the paso dressed in Roman military costumes or penitential robes.

Those members who wish to do so wear these penitential robes with conical hats, or capirotes, used to conceal the face of the wearer. These "Nazarenos" or "Papones" (this word is typical of León) carry processional candles, may walk the city streets barefoot, and may carry shackles and chains on their feet as penance. A brass band, marching band, a drum and bugle band, or in the cases of Cartagena and Málaga a military band (such as that of the Spanish Legion or other military units) may accompany the group, playing funeral marches, hymns or "marchas" written for the occasion.

=== Music ===
Fifth responsory for Holy Saturday
Tomás Luis de Victoria's O vos omnes performed live by The Tudor Consort (2003)

Music for the Holy Week includes Lamentations of Jeremiah the Prophet, Responsories for Holy Week, Passion oratorios and Easter oratorios.

Tomás Luis de Victoria's Officium Hebdomadae Sanctae (1585) contains settings of 37 texts for the Catholic liturgy of the Holy Week. Carlo Gesualdo's Responsoria et alia ad Officium Hebdomadae Sanctae spectantia (1611) contains settings of all 27 Tenebrae responsories (for matins of Maundy Thursday, Good Friday and Holy Saturday), and of a few other text for use in lauds of the Holy Week. Leçons de ténèbres as composed by various French baroque composers were usually intended for performance during the evening of Holy Wednesday, Maundy Thursday and Good Friday.

== Holy Week in Eastern Christianity ==
=== Eastern Orthodoxy ===
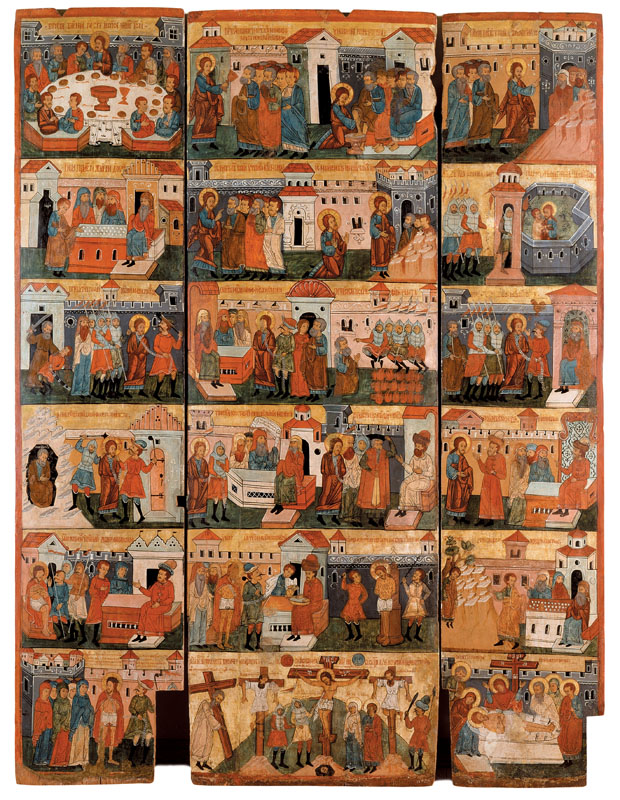
The icon "The Passion of Christ" from the late 16th century from the village of Bili Oslavy (Galicia, Ukraine). Passion cycles, or passions, together with the "Last Judgments", were among the obligatory subjects depicted in almost every church in the Carpathian region and Galicia.

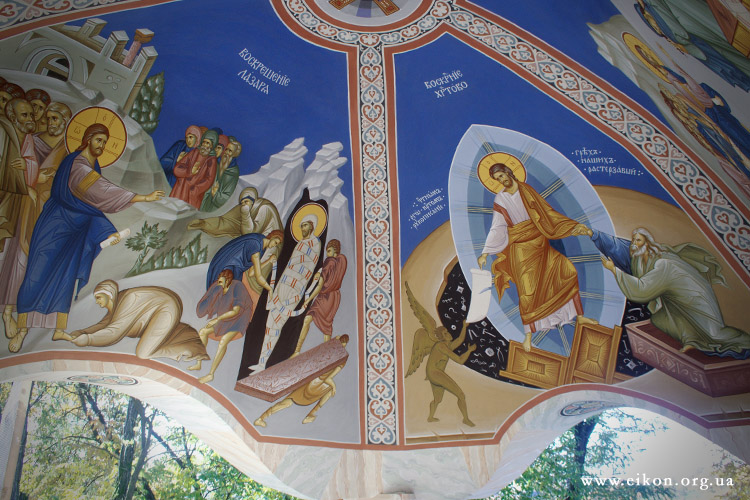
Resurrection of Jesus in the Saints Peter and Paul church, Bilky, Khust Raion, Ukraine

In the Eastern Orthodox Church, the forty days of Great Lent end on the Friday before Palm Sunday. The two days that follow, Lazarus Saturday and Palm Sunday, form a transition to Holy Week, neither in Lent nor in Holy Week themselves, lightening the fast, with fish eggs being allowed on Lazarus Saturday, and fish on Palm Sunday, which is the lightest degree of fasting (in the modern Greek usage, fish is allowed on Palm Sunday only if the feast of the Annunciation has not happened yet).

Lazarus Saturday commemorates Jesus raising Lazarus from the dead, just before he went to Jerusalem himself. The main themes anticipate the Resurrection of Jesus, showing him as master over death. As such, the service of Matins contains elements traditionally associated with Sundays, like the hymn "Having beheld the Resurrection of Christ...". Palm Sunday is considered one of the Great Feasts of the Lord, therefore the normal resurrectional elements of Sunday hymnography are omitted, and the services focus on the Entry of the Lord. As the events commemorated on these two days are closely related, some aspects of the sequence of events are found in the hymnography of both feasts: most famously, the apolytikion for Lazarus Saturday is used again for Palm Sunday, at various times superseding an other one which more closely focuses on the Entry of the Lord.

Holy Week is referred to as "Great and Holy Week", or "Passion Week". In the languages of traditionally Orthodox countries, the days of Holy Week are usually called Great Monday, Great Tuesday etc.

The Orthodox liturgical day starts at sunset (as it has from antiquity), meaning that during most of the year Vespers is the first service of the day. However, Holy Week differs in that respect, as the service of Vespers on Sunday evening, which should belong to Holy Monday, actually belongs to Palm Sunday, and all hymns still refer to the Entry of the Lord. Thus, for all days of Holy Week Vespers is actually the last service of the day. This is an essential aspect of Lent in general and Holy Week in particular: time is upended, reversed, which is mystagogical way of showing both that salvation is the work of God, and that God's ways are not understandable to the mind of man.

During Holy Week, in most parishes, services usually are held earlier than the canonical time (which is always preferred to holding them later than the canonical time) so that more faithful may attend. Thus, the service of matins of Great Monday is celebrated on Sunday evening in parish churches and vespers are celebrated the next morning.

Fasting during Great and Holy Week is very strict, as in Lent at a minimum: dairy products and meat products are strictly forbidden, and on most days, no alcoholic beverages are permitted and no oil is used in cooking. Holy Thursday being more joyful than the rest of the week, oil and wine are allowed, and it is traditional that hot wine be served along with dry fruit after the vesperal liturgy of Holy Saturday. Holy Friday especially may exceed Lenten norms. Those who can, including monastics, observe it as days of abstention, meaning that nothing is eaten. However, fasting is always adjusted to the needs of the individual, and those who are very young, ill or elderly are not expected to fast as strictly. Those who are able may receive the blessing of their spiritual father to observe an even stricter fast, whereby they eat only two meals that week: one on Wednesday night and one after Divine Liturgy on Thursday.

==== Great and Holy Monday through Wednesday ====
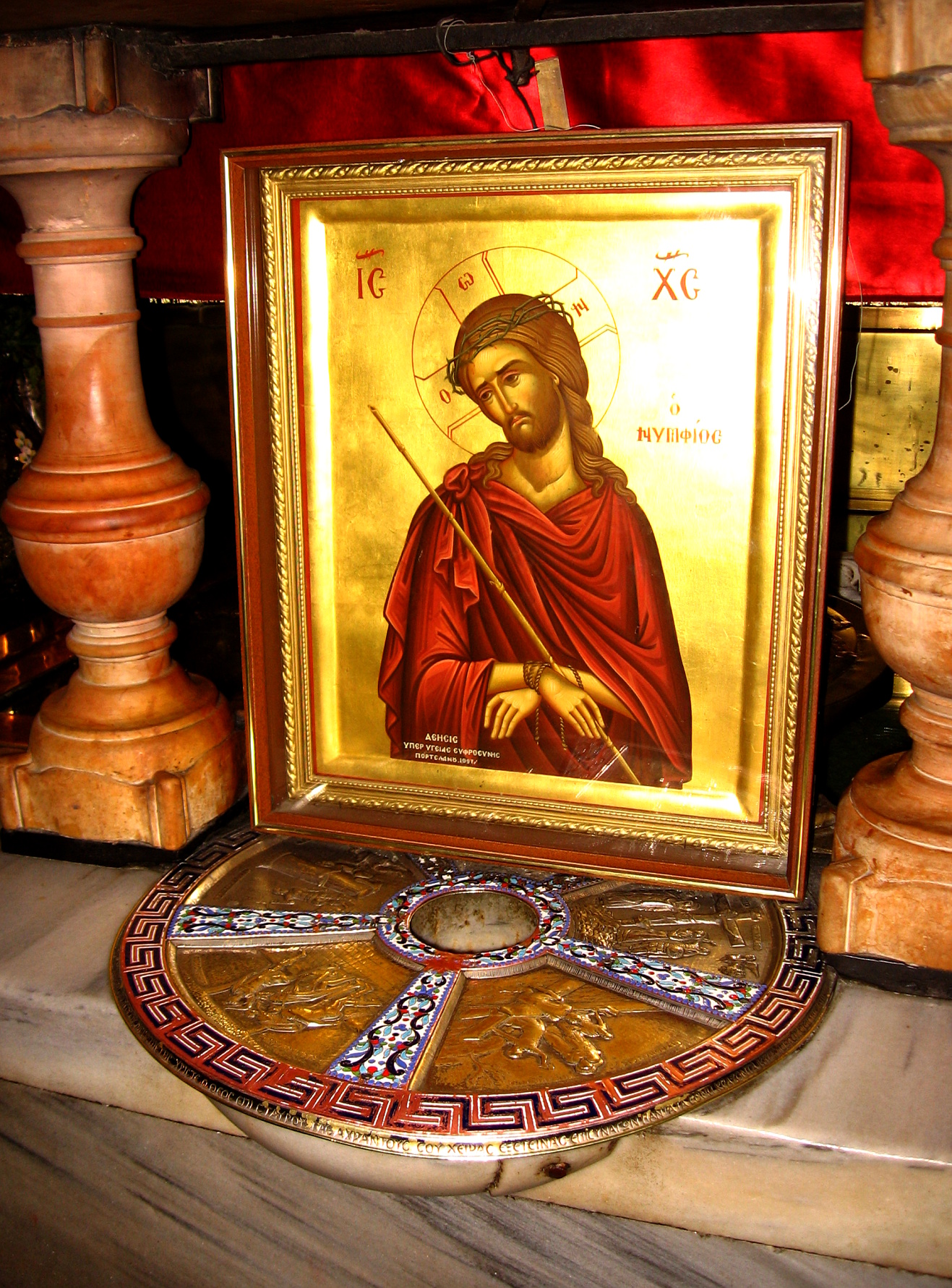
Icon of Christ the Bridegroom, sitting above the star at Golgotha in the Church of the Holy Sepulchre, Jerusalem

A new liturgical day beginning at sunset, the first liturgy of each day is vespers at which stichera are chanted elaborating the theme of the new day.

These days' Orthros liturgies (which in parishes is performed the previous night) are often referred to as the "Bridegroom Prayer", because of their theme of Christ as the Bridegroom of the Church, a theme expressed in the troparion that is solemnly chanted during them. On these days, an icon of the "Bridegroom" is placed on an analogion in the center of the temple, portraying Jesus wearing the purple robe of mockery and crowned with a crown of thorns (see Instruments of the Passion).

The same theme is repeated in the exapostilarion, a hymn which occurs near the end of the liturgy. These liturgies follow much the same pattern as liturgies on weekdays of Great Lent. The liturgies are so laid out that the entire Psalter (with the exception of Kathisma XVII) is chanted on the first three days of Holy Week. The canon that is chanted on these days is a "Triode", i.e., composed of three odes instead of the usual nine, as is in other weekday liturgies in the Triodion.

Towards the end of the Tuesday evening Bridegroom liturgy (Orthros for Great and Holy Wednesday), the Hymn of Kassiani is sung. The hymn (written in the 9th century by Kassia) tells of the woman who washed Christ's feet in the house of Simon the Pharisee (Luke 7:36–50). Much of the hymn is written from the perspective of the sinful woman:

O Lord, the woman who had fallen into many sins, sensing Your Divinity, takes upon herself the duty of a myrrh-bearer. With lamentations she brings you myrrh in anticipation of your entombment. "Woe to me!" she cries, "for me night has become a frenzy of licentiousness, a dark and moonless love of sin. Receive the fountain of my tears, O You who gathers into clouds the waters of the sea. Incline unto me, unto the sighings of my heart, O You who bowed the heavens by your ineffable condescension. I will wash your immaculate feet with kisses and dry them again with the tresses of my hair; those very feet at whose sound Eve hid herself from in fear when she heard You walking in Paradise in the twilight of the day. As for the multitude of my sins and the depths of Your judgements, who can search them out, O Savior of souls, my Savior? Do not disdain me Your handmaiden, O You who are boundless in mercy."

On vespers at the end of Monday through Wednesday is a reading from the Gospel which sets forth the new day's theme and then the Divine Liturgy of the Presanctified Gifts may be celebrated.

The Byzantine musical composition expresses the poetry so strongly that it leaves many people in a state of prayerful tears. The Hymn can last upwards of 25 minutes and is liturgically and musically a highpoint of the entire year.

==== Great and Holy Thursday ====
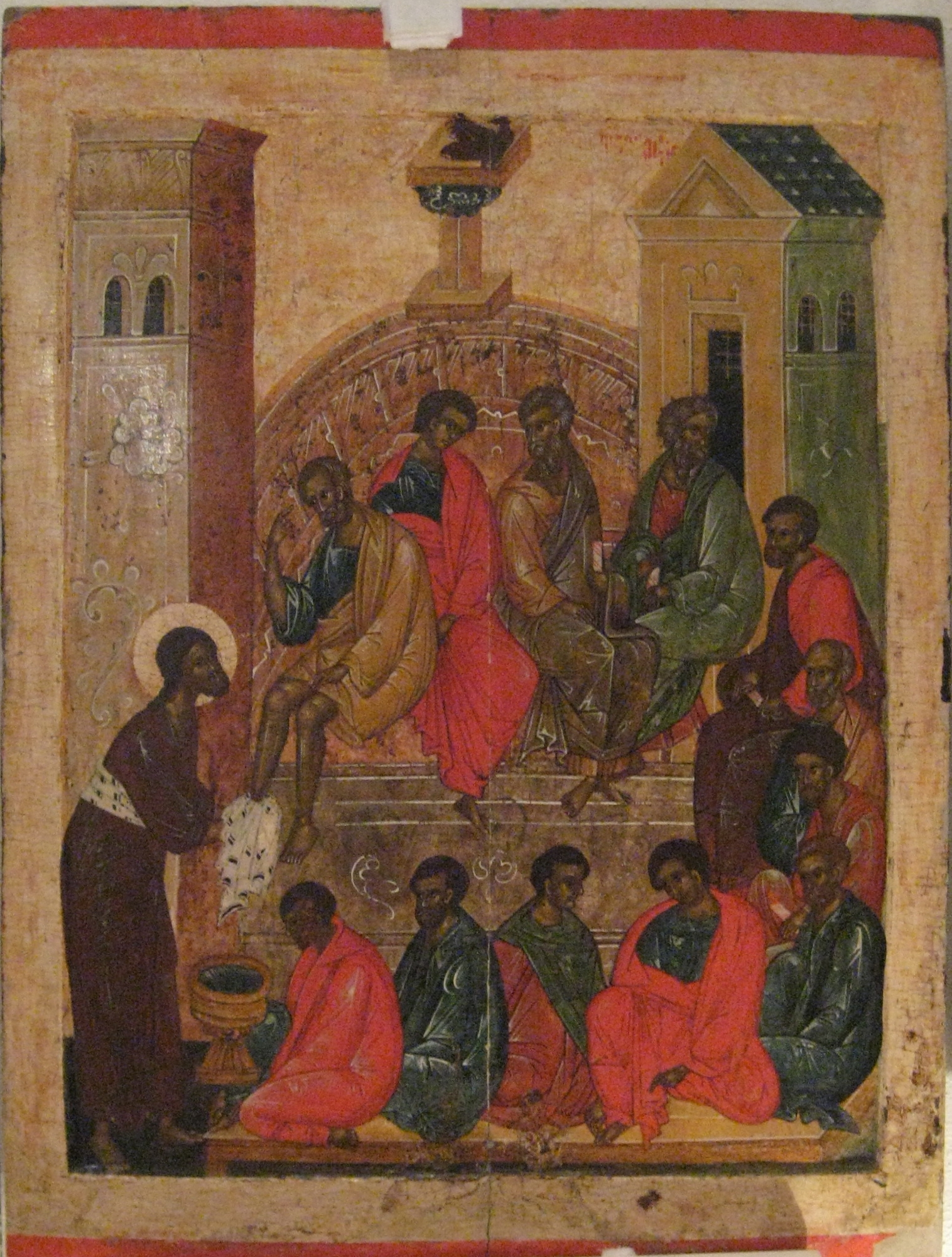
An Orthodox icon of Christ washing the feet of the Apostles (16th century, Pskov school of iconography)

In many churches, especially Greek Orthodox, a liturgy of Anointing (Holy Unction) is held on Wednesday evening, following the Presanctified Liturgy. This is in commemoration of the anointing of Jesus, and a preparation of the faithful to enter with Christ into his death and Resurrection. Those who wish to receive Holy Communion on Great and Holy Thursday, are encouraged to receive the Holy Mystery of Unction.

Orthros of Great and Holy Thursday does not follow the format of Great Lent (with the singular exception of chanting Alleluia in place of God is the Lord), but is celebrated as outside Lent, having a complete canon. Also, beginning at this liturgy there will be no more reading of the psalter for the rest of Holy Week, with the exception of kathisma XVII at Orthros of Great and Holy Saturday.

Divine Liturgy of the Last Supper is held on the morning of Great and Holy Thursday, combining Vespers with the Liturgy of Saint Basil the Great. There is a custom among some churches to place a simple white linen cloth over the Holy Table (altar) for this Liturgy, reminiscent of the Last Supper. In cathedrals and monasteries it is customary for the bishop or hegumen (abbot) to celebrate the Washing of Feet. When it is necessary for an autocephalous church to consecrate more chrysm the primate of that church will consecrate it at this Liturgy.

Great and Holy Thursday is the only day during Holy Week when those observing the strict tradition will eat a cooked meal, though they will not do so until after the dismissal of the Liturgy. At this meal wine and oil are permitted, but the faithful still abstain from meat and dairy products.

==== Great and Holy Friday ====
Matins of Great and Holy Friday is celebrated on the evening of Holy Thursday. During this liturgy, twelve Matins Gospels are chanted, from which this liturgy derives its name of "Matins of the Twelve Gospels". These Gospel lessons recount in chronological order the events from the Last Supper through the Crucifixion and burial of Jesus. At one point, when we reach the first Gospel which speaks of the Crucifixion, there is a custom for the priest to bring out a large cross with an icon of the crucified Christ attached to it, and places it in the center of the nave for all the faithful to venerate. This cross will remain in the center of the church until the bringing out of the epitaphios the next evening.

On Great and Holy Friday morning the Royal Hours are served. These are a solemn celebration of the Little Hours with added hymns and readings.

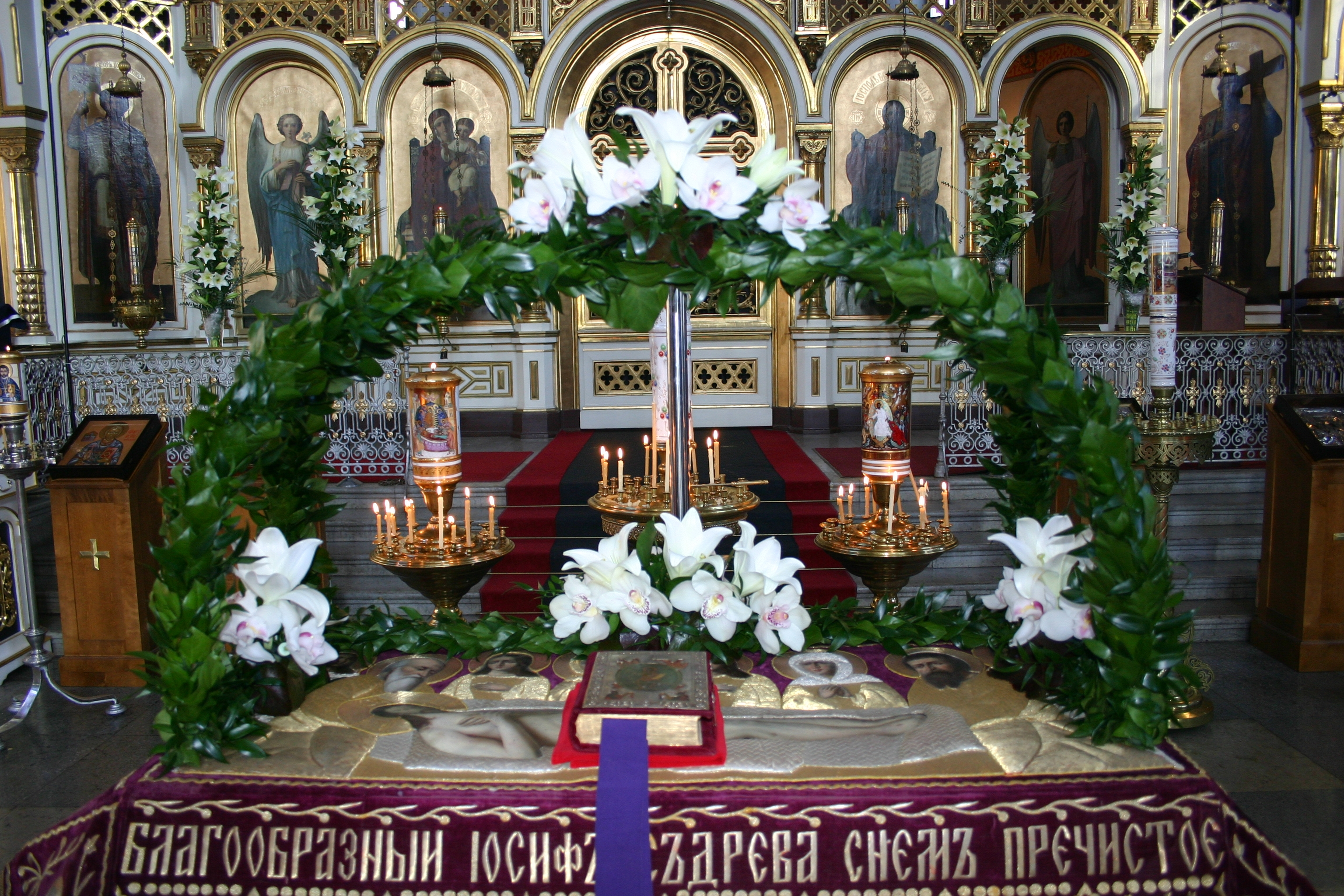
The Epitaphios (Plashchanitza) placed in the nave of the church for the faithful to venerate. The Gospel Book rests in the center.

Vespers of Great and Holy Friday (Vespers of the Deposition from the Cross) is held in the morning or early afternoon of Great and Holy Friday. The figure of Christ is taken down from the Cross, and a richly embroidered cloth icon called the Epitaphios (Church Slavonic: Plashchanitza) depicting Christ prepared for burial is laid in a "Tomb" decorated with flowers. At the end of the liturgy all come forward to venerate the Epitaphios.

Compline of Great and Holy Friday contains a Canon of Lamentations of the Theotokos (Mother of God).

==== Great and Holy Saturday ====
Matins of Great and Holy Saturday is, in parish practice, held on Friday evening. The liturgy is known as the "Orthros of Lamentations at the Tomb", because the majority of the liturgy is composed of the clergy and faithful gathered around the tomb, chanting the "Lamentations" interspersed between the verses of Kathisma XVII (Psalm 118). At a certain point the priest sprinkles the tomb with rose petals and rose water. Near the end of the liturgy, the Epitaphios is carried in a candlelit procession around the outside of the church as the faithful sing the Trisagion.

Vespers joined to the Divine Liturgy is served on Great and Holy Saturday, prescribed by the Liturgical books to be served in the afternoon but often served in the morning. This is the Proti Anastasi (First Resurrection) liturgy, commemorating the Harrowing of Hell. Just before the reading of the Gospel, the hangings and vestments and changed from dark lenten colors to white, and the entire mood of the liturgy changes from mourning to joy. However, the faithful do not yet greet one another with the Paschal kiss, since the Resurrection has not yet been announced to the living.

If there are catechumens who are prepared for baptism they are baptized and chrismated during the Old Testament readings.

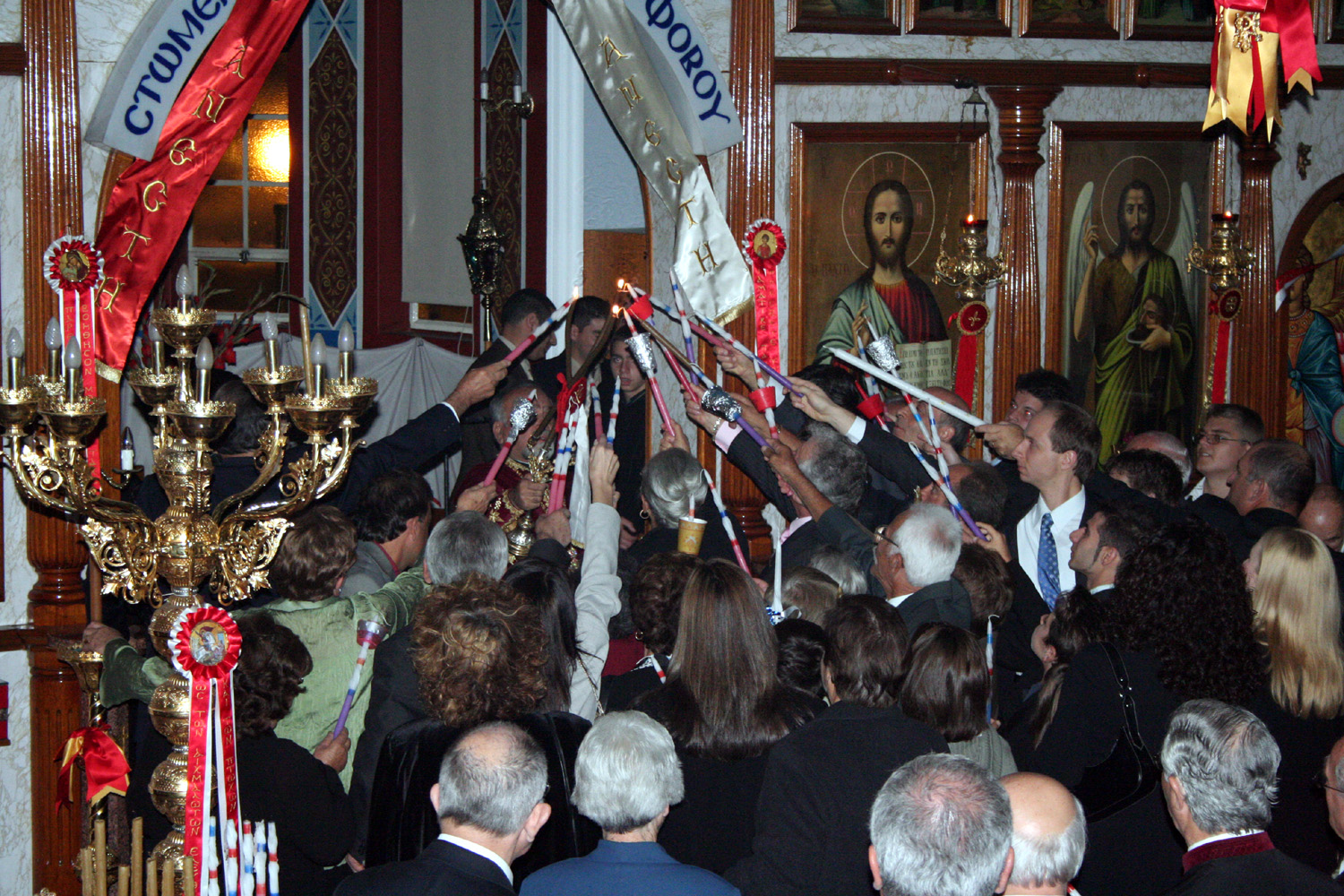
People receiving the Holy Light at Easter from Father Diogenis at St George Greek Orthodox Church, Adelaide

On Saturday night, the Paschal Vigil begins around 11:00 pm with the chanting of the Midnight Office. Afterwards, all of the lighting in the church is extinguished and all remain in silence and darkness until the stroke of midnight. Then, the priest lights a single candle from the eternal flame on the altar (which is never extinguished). The light is spread from person to person until everyone holds a lighted candle.

A procession then circles around the outside of the church, recreating the journey of the Myrrhbearers as they journeyed to the Tomb of Jesus on the first Easter morning. The procession stops in front of the closed doors of the church. The opening of these doors symbolized the "rolling away of the stone" from the tomb by the angel, and all enter the church joyfully singing the Troparion of Pascha. Paschal Orthros begins with an Ektenia (litany) and the chanting of the Paschal Canon.

One of the highpoints is the sharing of the paschal kiss and the reading of the Hieratikon (Catechetical Homily of John Chrysostom) by the priest. The Divine Liturgy follows, and every Orthodox Christian is encouraged to confess and receive Holy Communion on this holiest day of the year. A breakfast usually follows, sometimes lasting till dawn. Slavs bring Easter baskets filled with eggs, meat, butter, and cheese—foods from which the faithful have abstained during Great Lent—to be blessed by the priest which are then taken back home to be shared by family and friends with joy.

On the afternoon of Easter Day, a joyful liturgy called "Agape Vespers" is celebrated. During this liturgy, the Great Prokeimenon is chanted and a lesson from the Gospel (John 20:19–25) is read in as many different languages as possible, accompanied by the joyful ringing of bells.

=== Coptic Orthodox Church ===
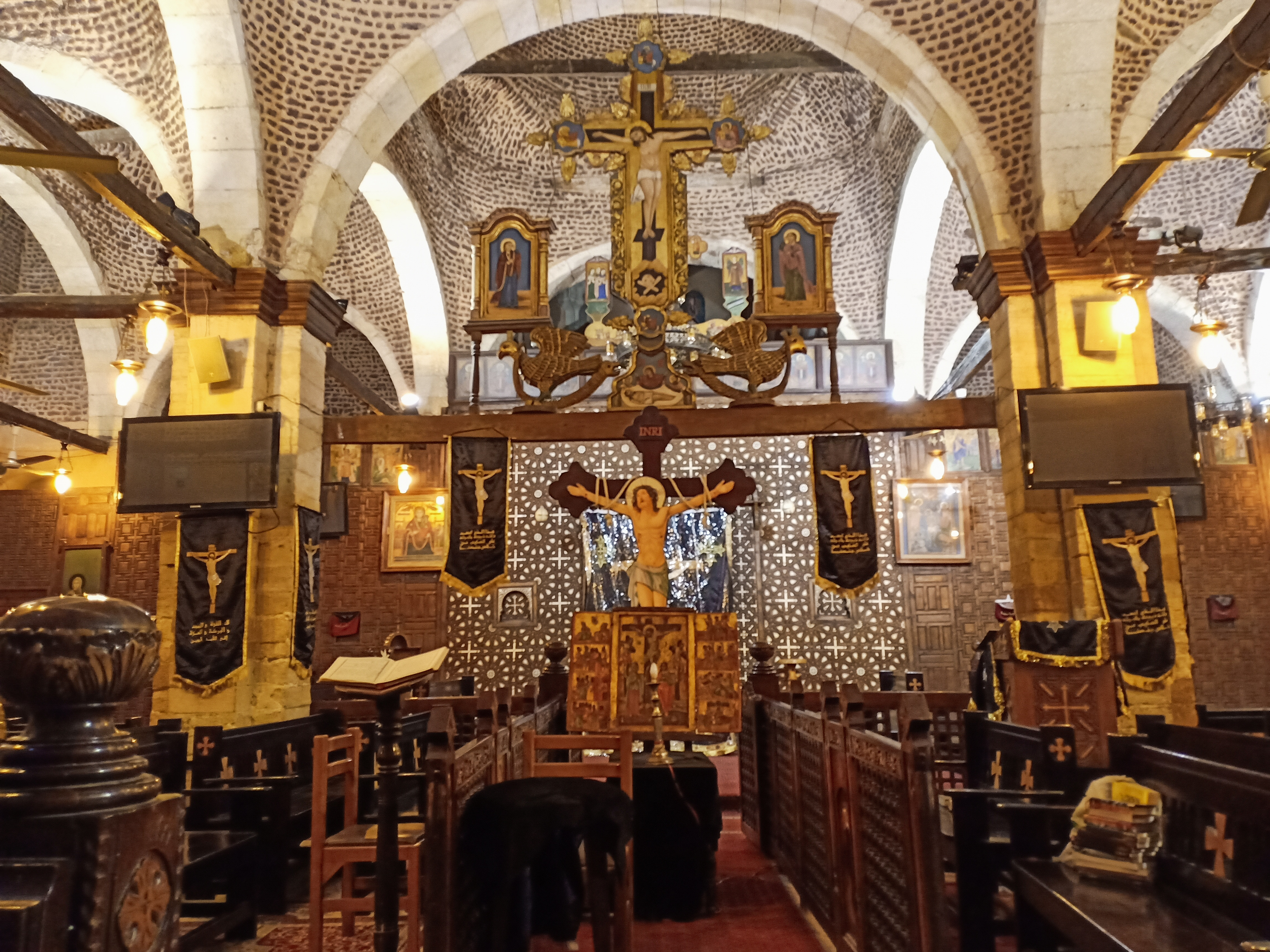
The Church of Saint Mary in Haret Elroum on Good Friday

The Coptic Orthodox Christians fast the Lent for 55 days including the Holy Week which they call Holy Paschal Week.

The Friday before Palm Sunday is called "The Concluding Friday of Great Lent". On this day a special liturgy called "The Unction of the Sick" is conducted. It consists of seven prayers and at the conclusion of the prayers, the priest anoints each member of the congregation with the holy oil.

The following day – the last Saturday before Holy Week – is called "Lazarus Saturday". On this day the Coptic Church commemorates the Raising of Lazarus, the brother of Martha and Mary of Bethany. This day is related to the events of Holy Week in that John 12 tells of a visit of Jesus to Lazarus immediately before recounting the events of Palm Sunday.

Since the liturgical day starts from the evening before a calendar day, the prayers of Palm Sunday begin on the evening of Lazarus' Saturday.

Throughout Holy Week, a paschal liturgy is conducted each evening, starting on Sunday night (the eve of Monday), and every morning, up until Easter. These paschal liturgies take place in the middle of the church, not on the altar, because Jesus suffered and was crucified on Golgotha, outside of Jerusalem. The altar is bared of all its coverings and relics.

Each day liturgy is divided into 5 "hours"; The First Hour, The Third Hour, The Sixth Hour, The Ninth Hour, and The Eleventh Hour. Likewise, each night liturgy is also divided into the same five hours. However, Good Friday has an extra hour added to it, that of The Twelfth Hour. During each hour, one or a few prophecies are read at the beginning, a hymn ("Thine is the Power") is chanted twelve times, a psalm is sung in a sad tune, one passage from a gospel is read, and an exposition concludes the hour. On Good Friday Eve and Good Friday, all four gospel accounts of the day's events are read, and more prophecies are read as well. From Tuesday night onward, the people do not greet each other nor the priests, and do not even kiss the icons of saints in the church, because it was with a kiss that Judas betrayed Jesus.

On Thursday of Holy Week, also called Covenant Thursday, a liturgy is prayed and communion is given to symbolize the Last Supper of Jesus. Also, before the liturgy the priests wash the feet of the congregation in imitation of Jesus washing his disciples' feet.

Late Friday night until early Saturday morning is called Apocalypse Night or Holy Saturday. During this night, another liturgy is prayed and the entire Book of Revelation is read, to symbolize the Second Coming.

The series concludes with the Easter liturgy on Saturday night, followed by a gathering in the church (or a park) where the participants can celebrate the joy of the Resurrection, eating together and ending their long fast, and at which they are permitted once again to partake of meat, fish, and dairy products. From Easter until Pentecost the usual fasts on Wednesday and Friday are not observed, because it's a time of joy called the Holy Fifty Days.

=== Eastern Catholic Churches and Eastern Lutheran churches ===
Holy Week observances and customs of the Eastern Catholic and Eastern Lutheran churches are generally the same as in the rites of the corresponding Eastern Orthodox or Oriental Orthodox Church or Assyrian Church of the East.

== Related observances ==
Through time, the festival of Holy Week was extended at both ends, with observances starting on Friday of Sorrows, the last Friday before Palm Sunday, and Eastertide, with various observances marking days of the Easter Octave.

=== Friday of Sorrows ===
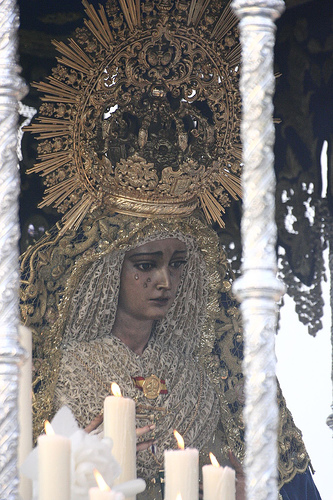
Regarded as the most famous in Spain during Holy Week processions, the Virgin of Hope of Macarena, shown in her sorrowful theme while wearing imperial regalia each Friday before Palm Sunday

The religious processions that are part of the Holy Week celebrations in many countries begin two days before Holy Week on what in those countries is called Friday of Sorrows.

On the Friday before Holy Week, the Roman Rite celebrated universally from 1727 to 1969 a liturgical feast of the Seven Sorrows of Mary. Celebration of this feast began in Germany but spread to many other countries even before Pope Benedict XIII made it a universal feast, assigning it to the Friday before Palm Sunday. Another feast with the same name was and still is celebrated in September. With his Code of Rubrics of 1960, Pope John XXIII reduced the feast on the Friday of what was then called Passion Week (the week before Holy Week) to the level of a commemoration, and in 1969 the celebration was removed from the General Roman Calendar as a duplicate of the September feast. Pope John Paul II's 2002 edition of the Roman Missal provides an alternative collect for this Friday:

O God, who in this season
give your Church the grace
to imitate devoutly the Blessed Virgin Mary
in contemplating the Passion of Christ,
grant, we pray, through her intercession,
that we may cling more firmly each day
to your Only Begotten Son
and come at last to the fullness of his grace.

This provision of an alternative collect was the equivalent of granting the Lenten celebration of Our Lady of Sorrow the rank of memorial, since during Lent a memorial, even if otherwise obligatory, is represented in the liturgy of the day at most by optional use of its collect. The liturgical calendar of Malta gives the celebration the rank of feast, making its observance obligatory. Observance of the Tridentine Mass calendar as it stood in 1962 is still permitted in the circumstances indicated in the 2007 document Summorum Pontificum, giving Our Lady of Sorrows a commemoration within the liturgy of the Friday.

In many Latin American countries, such as Mexico, Brazil, Nicaragua, Guatemala and Peru, as well as in Spain and the Philippines, this Friday feast of Our Lady of Sorrows is called Viernes de Dolores (Friday of Sorrows). It is sometimes also referred to as "Council Friday", because of the choice of John 11:47–54 as the Gospel passage read in the Tridentine Mass on that day (which is now read in slightly expanded form on Saturday of the fifth week of Lent), which recounts the meeting of the Sanhedrin to discuss what to do with Jesus. Its date is exactly a week before Good Friday.

The somber and often nocturnal commemoration with public processions directs thoughts to the desolate emotional state of the Virgin Mary on Black Saturday as prophesied by the Rabbi Simeon on the "seven sorrows" that as an allegorical sword pierced her heart. She is represented as worrying and grieving with Saint Mary Magdalene for Jesus; therefore the event is markedly similar to a mourning event among the people.

=== Octave of Easter ===
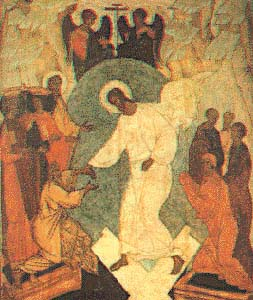
Russian Orthodox icon of the Resurrection of Jesus Christ depicting his descent into Hades, 16th century.

The Octave of Easter, also referred to as Bright Week in the Eastern tradition, is the eight-day period (octave) in Eastertide that starts on Easter Sunday and concludes with the following Sunday.

==== Easter Monday ====
Easter Monday is the day after Easter Sunday and is a holiday in some countries. Easter Monday in the Western Christian liturgical calendar is the second day of Eastertide and analogously in the Byzantine Rite is the second day of Bright Week. Recognized as a bank holiday in many countries, many traditional religious events, as open-air Masses and blessings with the Easter water happen on Easter Monday, as well as other popular traditions linked to the Easter eggs, such as the Easter omelette, made from Easter eggs and shared with friends and neighbours in the South of France.

===== Dyngus Day in Central Europe =====
Śmigus-dyngus (Polish pronunciation: [ˈɕmigus ˈdɨnɡus]; also lany poniedziałek, meaning "Wet Monday" in Polish; Czech: Oblévačka; Slovak: Oblievačka; Hungarian: Vízbevető; Ukrainian: поливаний понеділок) is a Catholic celebration held on Easter Monday mostly in Poland, but also in the Czech Republic, Slovakia, Hungary and some parts of western Ukraine. It is also observed by Polish diaspora communities, particularly among Polish Americans, who call it Dyngus Day.

Traditionally, boys throw water over girls and spank them with pussy willow branches on Easter Monday, and girls do the same to boys. This is accompanied by a number of other rituals, such as making verse declarations and holding door-to-door processions, in some regions involving boys dressed as bears or other creatures. The origins of the celebration are uncertain, but it may date to pagan times before 1000 AD; it is described in writing as early as the 15th century. It continues to be observed throughout Central Europe, and also in the United States, where certain patriotic American elements have been added to the traditional Polish ones.

===== Bright Monday in the Eastern Orthodox Church =====
In the Eastern Orthodox Church and Byzantine Rite Catholic Churches, this day is called "Bright Monday" or "Renewal Monday". The services, as in the rest of Bright Week, are quite different from during the rest of the year and are similar to the services on Pascha (Easter Sunday) and include an outdoor procession after the Divine Liturgy; while this is prescribed for all days of that week, often they are only celebrated on Monday and maybe a couple of other days in parish churches, especially in non-Orthodox countries. Also, when the calendar date of the feast day of a major saint, e.g., St. George or the patron saint of a church or one's name day, falls during Holy Week or on Easter Sunday, the saint's day is celebrated on Easter Monday.

===== Sham-Ennessim in Coptic Church =====
A different celebration of Easter Monday takes place in Egypt. Sham Ennessim (Arabic: شم النسيم, Sham Al Nassim or Sham an-Nassim, IPA: [ˈʃæmm ennɪˈsiːm]) Coptic: Ϭⲱⲙ ̀ⲛⲛⲓⲥⲓⲙ, Shom Ennisim) is an Egyptian national holiday marking the beginning of spring. It always falls on the day after the Eastern Christian Easter (following the custom of the largest Christian denomination in the country, the Coptic Orthodox Church).

==== Easter Tuesday (Emmaus Tuesday) ====
Easter Tuesday is the second day after Easter Sunday and is a holiday in a few rare countries or regions like Tasmania.

In the Latin tradition, the Gospel of the Pilgrims of Emmaus was traditionally sung on Easter Tuesday during the liturgy. For that reason, it was on Easter Tuesday that joyful plays would echo the more tragic processions of Holy Week. These plays, which originated in the Benedictine monasteries, became known as the Officium Peregrinorum. They were popular during the Middle Ages, but remained an "unusual liturgical drama in the West".

== See also ==
- Divine Mercy Sunday
- Holy Week in Mexico
- Holy Week in Spain
- Holy Week in the Philippines
- Holy Week procession
