= Missa bifaciata =

Former form of a Mass

A Missa bifaciata (Latin for 'twice-performed Mass') or Missa trifaciata (Latin for 'thrice-performed Mass') was a type of Mass wherein the priest would pray the texts of the Mass of the Catechumens multiple times.

This practice was common in the late Middle Ages when it was used on days with multiple liturgical feasts, such as when the feast day of a saint coincided with a Sunday, and the celebration of a second Mass by a priest was not possible due to restrictions against bination. It also allowed the fulfillment of several Mass intentions on one day. In a Missa bifaciata, the texts of two Masses (or three, in the case of a Missa trifaciata) from the beginning up to Offertory or the Preface would be prayed. This would then be joined to the Canon of the Mass.

According to Richard Hart, this allowed a priest to receive multiple stipends. This form of Mass was considered an abuse, and was forbidden by medieval councils.

== See also ==
- Missa Sicca
- Sine populo
