= Mass in the Catholic Church =

Central liturgical ritual of the Catholic Church

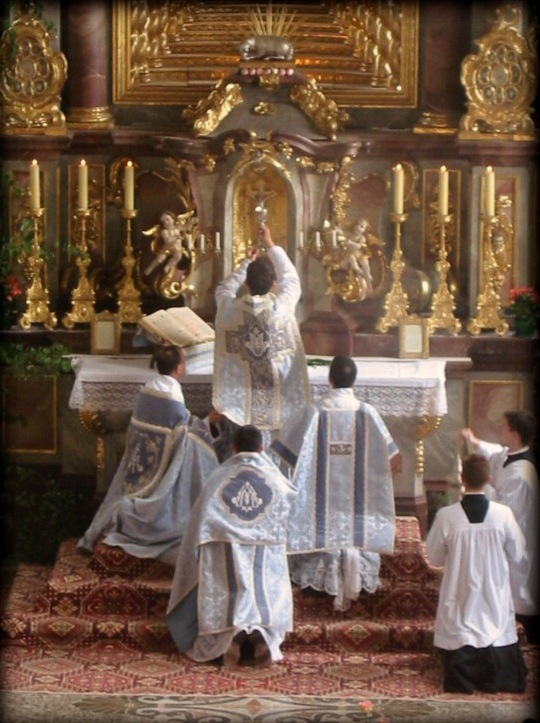
Tridentine Mass celebrated by the Priestly Fraternity of Saint Peter

The Mass is the central liturgy of the Eucharist in the Catholic Church, in which bread and wine are consecrated and become the body and blood of Christ. As defined by the Church at the Council of Trent, in the Mass "the same Christ who offered himself once in a bloody manner on the altar of the cross, is present and offered in an unbloody manner". The Church describes the Mass as the "source and summit of the Christian life", and teaches that the Mass is a sacrifice, in which the sacramental bread and wine, through consecration by an ordained priest, become the sacrificial body, blood, soul, and divinity of Christ as the sacrifice on Calvary made truly present once again on the altar. The Catholic Church permits only baptised members in the state of grace (Catholics who are not in a state of mortal sin) to receive Christ in the Eucharist.

Many of the other sacraments of the Catholic Church, such as confirmation, holy orders, and (often) holy matrimony, are generally administered within a celebration of Mass, but before the Second Vatican Council (1962–1965) these were often or even usually administered separately. The term Mass, also Holy Mass, is commonly used to describe the celebration of the Eucharist in the Latin Church, while the various Eastern Catholic liturgies use terms such as Divine Liturgy, Holy Qurbana, and Badarak, in accordance with each one's tradition.

The term Mass is derived from the concluding words of the Roman Rite Mass in Latin: Ite, missa est ('Go, it is the dismissal', officially translated as 'Go forth, the Mass is ended'). The Late Latin word missa substantively corresponds to the classical Latin word missio. In antiquity, missa simply meant 'dismissal'. In Christian usage, however, it gradually took on a deeper meaning. The word dismissal has come to imply a mission.

== Sacrificial nature ==
In Catholic teaching, the holy sacrifice of the Mass is the fulfillment of all the sacrifices of the Old Covenant. In the New Covenant, the one sacrifice on the altar of Calvary is revisited during every Catholic Mass. Catholics believe that Jesus Christ merited all graces and blessings for humans by His death on the Cross, and that these merits form an inexhaustible fountain of grace to nourish the supernatural life of souls. At Calvary, Christ is said to have not only merited all graces for people but also established certain channels whereby these graces may be obtained. These channels are the Sacrifice of the Mass and the other Sacraments.

The Mass is said to be instituted by Christ at the Last Supper, on the first Holy Thursday. Thus, the first Holy Sacrifice of the Mass was celebrated on the eve of the Passion. The unbloody sacrifice of the Last Supper is considered a memorial of Christ's bloody sacrifice on the cross. Thus, for Catholics, the Mass is a unifying event of the Last Supper and Christ's sacrifice on Calvary. The Council of Trent referred to Christ "present and offered in an unbloody manner" in the Mass, and the Second Vatican Council also stated that he "is offered sacramentally in the Eucharist and in an unbloody manner until [he] himself comes".

The Mass contains the four essential elements of a Jewish/Christian sacrifice: priest, victim, altar, and sacrifice. Its Priest, Jesus Christ, uses the ministry of an earthly representative; its Victim, Jesus Christ, truly present under the appearances of bread and wine; its altar; and the Sacrifice is a mystic representation of the blood-shedding of Calvary. The Mass is thus offered for four ends: adoration, atonement, thanksgiving, and petition.

== History ==
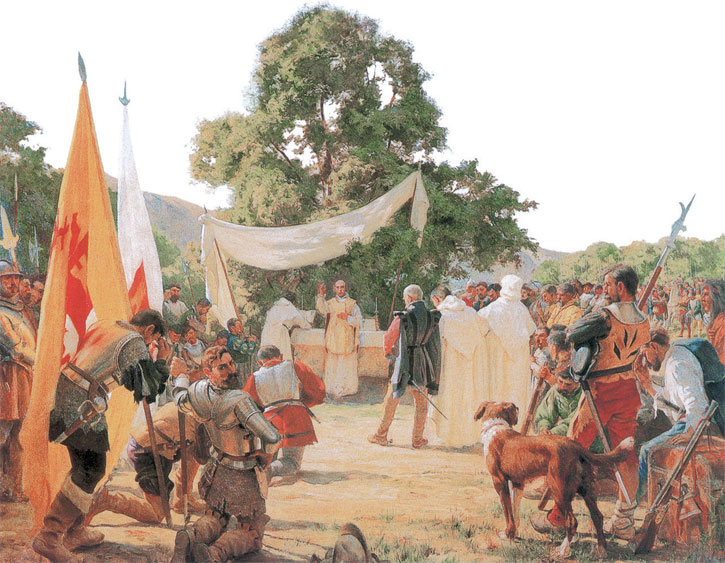
Depiction of the first Mass in Chile, by Pedro Subercaseaux

The classic study of the Mass is that of Josef Andreas Jungmann, the two-volume Mass of the Roman Rite or Missarum Solemnia. Paul F. Bradshaw and Maxwell E. Johnson trace the history of eucharistic liturgies from first-century shared meals of Christian communities, which became associated with the Last Supper, to second and third-century rites mentioned by Pliny the Younger and Ignatius of Antioch and described by Justin Martyr and others, in which passages from Scripture were read and the use of bread and wine was no longer associated with a full meal.

When in the fourth century Christianity was granted the status of a legal religion and was even viewed with favour by the Roman Emperors, the Christian celebrations took on a more formal appearance and were embellished by the use of vestments, lights and incense. Ex tempore prayers by the presider gave way to texts previously approved by synods of bishops as a guarantee of the orthodoxy of the content, leading to the formation of liturgical forms or "rites" generally associated with influential episcopal sees.

The Catholic Church encompasses a considerable number of such liturgical rites. Apart from the Latin liturgical rites, Mass in the Catholic Church is also celebrated according to the Byzantine Rite (in various languages based on Greek texts of the Church of Constantinople); the Alexandrian Rite (used by the Coptic Catholic Church, the Eritrean Catholic Church and the Ethiopian Catholic Church); the Antiochene Rite (used by the Maronite Church, the Syriac Catholic Church and the Syro-Malankara Catholic Church); the East Syriac Rite (used by the Chaldean Catholic Church and the Syro-Malabar Catholic Church); and the Armenian Rite (used by the Armenian Catholic Church).

=== Mass in the Roman Rite ===
Within the Latin Church, the Roman Rite Mass is by far the most widely used liturgical rite. The history of the development of the Mass of this rite comprises the Pre-Tridentine Mass, the Tridentine Mass and the post-Vatican II Mass.

The Pre-Tridentine Mass of the Roman Rite was adopted even north of the Alps (but often modified by non-Roman influences) even before the time of Charlemagne, who wished it to be used throughout his empire, but the text actually distributed incorporated many Gallican additions. Roman missionaries, such as Boniface and Augustine of Canterbury introduced the Roman Mass to Germany and England. It was accepted also in Ireland, but met greater opposition in Spain and Milan.

In accordance with the decrees of the Council of Trent (1545–1563), Pope Pius V in 1570 enforced use of the Tridentine Mass in the Latin Church. Before the invention of printing, each diocese of the Latin Church could and often did have its own particular Rite of Mass, generally but not necessarily based on the Roman Rite; but Pius V made his revision of the Roman Missal mandatory throughout the Latin Church, permitting continuance of other rites only if they had been in existence for at least 200 years.

The Second Vatican Council also decreed a revision of the Roman Missal, which was put into effect by Pope Paul VI in 1969.

Pope Benedict XVI's 2007 motu proprio Summorum Pontificum authorized under certain conditions, more widely than before, continued use of the 1962 form of the Roman Rite, which it called the Extraordinary Form of the Roman Rite, while it called the post–Vatican II form promulgated by Pope Paul VI in 1969 and revised by Pope John Paul II in 2002 the Ordinary Form. On 16 July 2021 Pope Francis in his apostolic letter Traditionis custodes restricted the celebration of the Tridentine Mass of the Roman Rite and declared that "the liturgical books promulgated by Saint Paul VI and Saint John Paul II, in conformity with the decrees of Vatican Council II, are the unique expression of the lex orandi of the Roman Rite."

== Roman Rite of the Mass in modernity ==
Present-day forms of the Roman Rite Mass

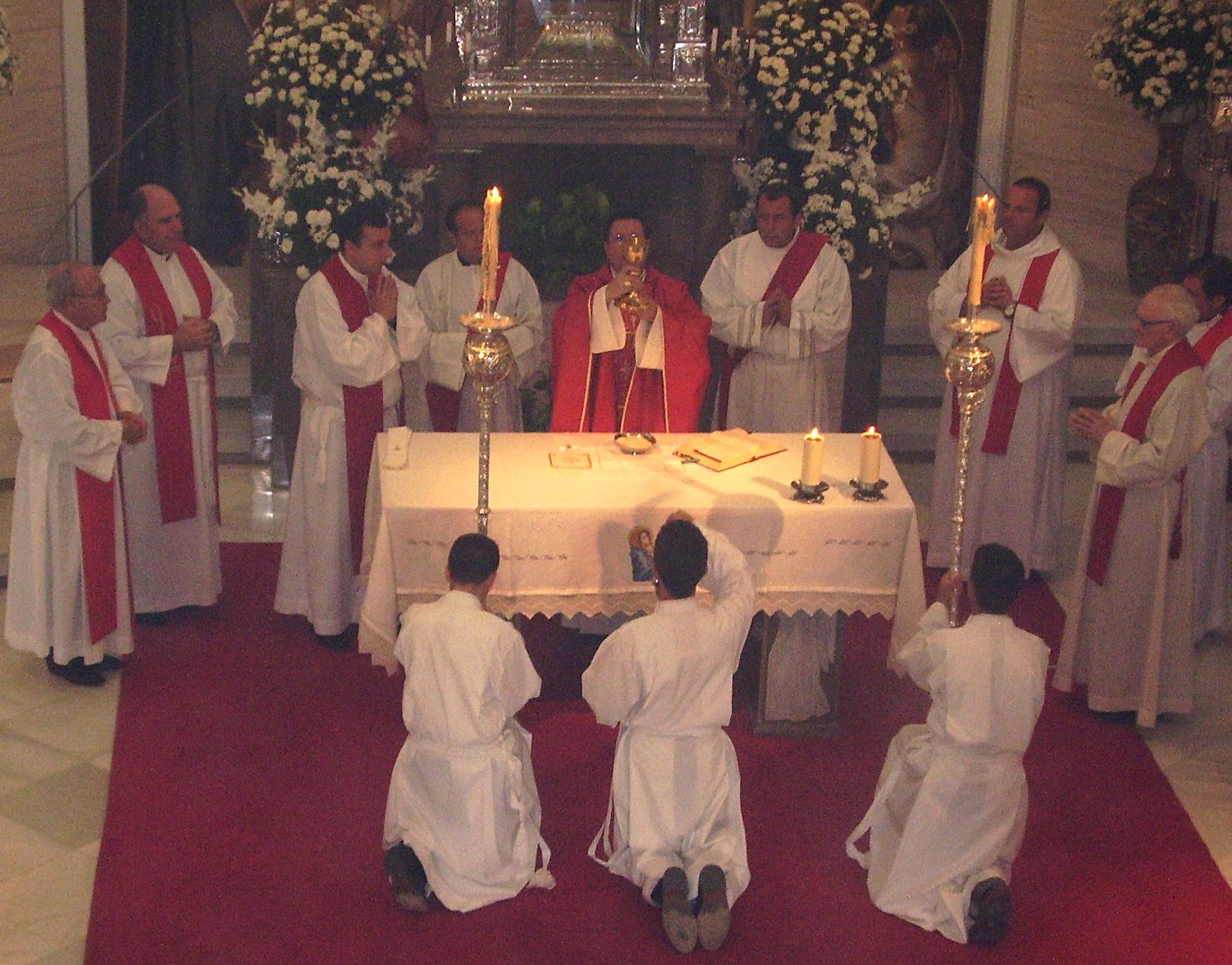
Mass of Paul VI (post–Vatican II)

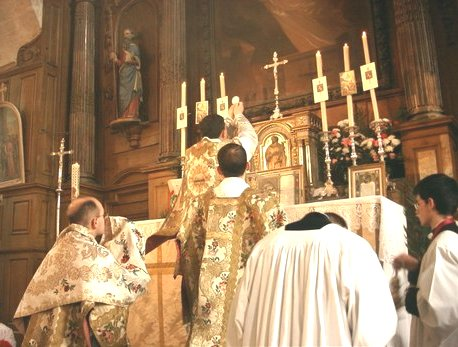
Tridentine Mass (1962 missal), Solemn Mass form

The following description of the celebration of Mass, usually in the local vernacular language, is limited to the form of the Roman Rite promulgated after the Second Vatican Council by Pope Paul VI in 1969 and revised by Pope John Paul II in 2002, largely replacing the usage of the Tridentine Mass form originally promulgated in 1570 in accordance with decrees of the Council of Trent in its closing session (1545–46). The 1962 form of the Tridentine Mass, in the Latin language alone, may be employed where authorized by the Holy See or, in the circumstances indicated in the 2021 document Traditionis custodes, by the diocesan bishop.

In the modern form the priest usually (though not obligatorily) faces the people (versus populum); in the earlier form the priest most often (but again, not obligatorily) faces in the apse of the church, a stance that since the twentieth century is often called ad orientem, although not necessarily eastward.

As mentioned, the Eucharistic liturgy is celebrated in the Catholic Church also in other Latin liturgical rites and in those of the Eastern Catholic Churches.

The Catechism of the Catholic Church discusses the importance of the Mass in the Catholic tradition under the headings:

I. The Eucharist – Source and Summit of Ecclesial Life
II. What is This Sacrament Called?
III. The Eucharist in the Economy of Salvation
IV. The Liturgical Celebration of the Eucharist
V. The Sacramental Sacrifice Thanksgiving, Memorial, Presence
VI. The Paschal Banquet
VII. The Eucharist – "Pledge of the Glory To Come"

=== Liturgical books ===
The Roman Missal contains the prayers, antiphons and rubrics of the Mass.

The Lectionary presents passages from the Bible arranged in the order for reading at each day's Mass. Compared with the scripture readings in the pre–Vatican II Missal, the modern Lectionary contains a much wider variety of passages, too extensive to include in the Missal. A separate Book of the Gospels, also called the Evangeliary, is recommended for the reading from the Gospels, but where this book is not available the Lectionary, which also includes the Gospels, is used.

The Roman Missal refers to another liturgical book, the Ceremonial of Bishops, saying the norms found in it are to be observed when a bishop celebrates the Mass, or presides without celebrating the Eucharist. An English translation was published in 1989.

The Roman Missal also says special celebrations of Mass should observe the guidelines for them. This includes Masses with children, in the "Directory for Masses with Children", by the Sacred Congregation for Divine Worship, 1 November 1973.

The most frequently celebrated form of the Roman Rite Mass is that in the post–Vatican II editions of the Roman Missal. Authorization for use of the earlier (1962) form may be granted by the Holy See or, as indicated in the 2021 document Traditionis custodes, by the diocesan bishop.

== Liturgical structure ==
The Eucharistic celebration is "one single act of worship" but consists of different elements, which always include "the proclamation of the Word of God; thanksgiving to God the Father for all his benefits, above all the gift of his Son; the consecration of bread and wine, which signifies also our own transformation into the body of Christ; and participation in the liturgical banquet by receiving the Lord's body and blood".

Within the fixed structure of the Roman-Rite Mass outlined below, the "proper" or daily-varying parts are the Scripture readings and responsorial psalm, the antiphons at the entrance and communion processions, and the texts of the three prayers known as the collect, the prayer over the gifts, and the Prayer after Communion. These convey themes from the liturgical season, the feast days of titles or events in the life of Christ, the feast days and commemorations of the saints, or for Masses for particular circumstances (e.g., funerals, First Communion, Confirmation, Matrimony, votive Masses, and Masses for various needs and occasions, including peace, the start of the academic year, etc.).

=== Introductory rites ===
The priest enters in procession into the nave with altar servers, and with a deacon if there is one. The deacon may carry the Book of the Gospels (or Evangelion), which he will place on the altar; and one altar server, called the cross bearer (or crucifer), carries a processional cross at the front of the procession. Other servers may carry processional candles, incense and a thurible. During this procession, ordinarily, the entrance chant or hymn is sung. If there is no singing at the entrance, the entrance antiphon is recited either by some or all of the faithful or by a lector; otherwise it is said by the priest himself. When the procession arrives at the sanctuary, all bow toward the altar. The priest and other ordained ministers kiss the altar. Then, when the priest arrives at his chair, he leads the assembly in making the Sign of the Cross, saying: "In the name of the Father, and of the Son, and of the Holy Spirit", to which the faithful answer: "Amen." Then the priest "signifies the presence of the Lord to the community gathered there by means of the Greeting. By this Greeting and the response of the faithful, the mystery of the Church gathered together is made manifest." The greetings are derived from the Pauline epistles.

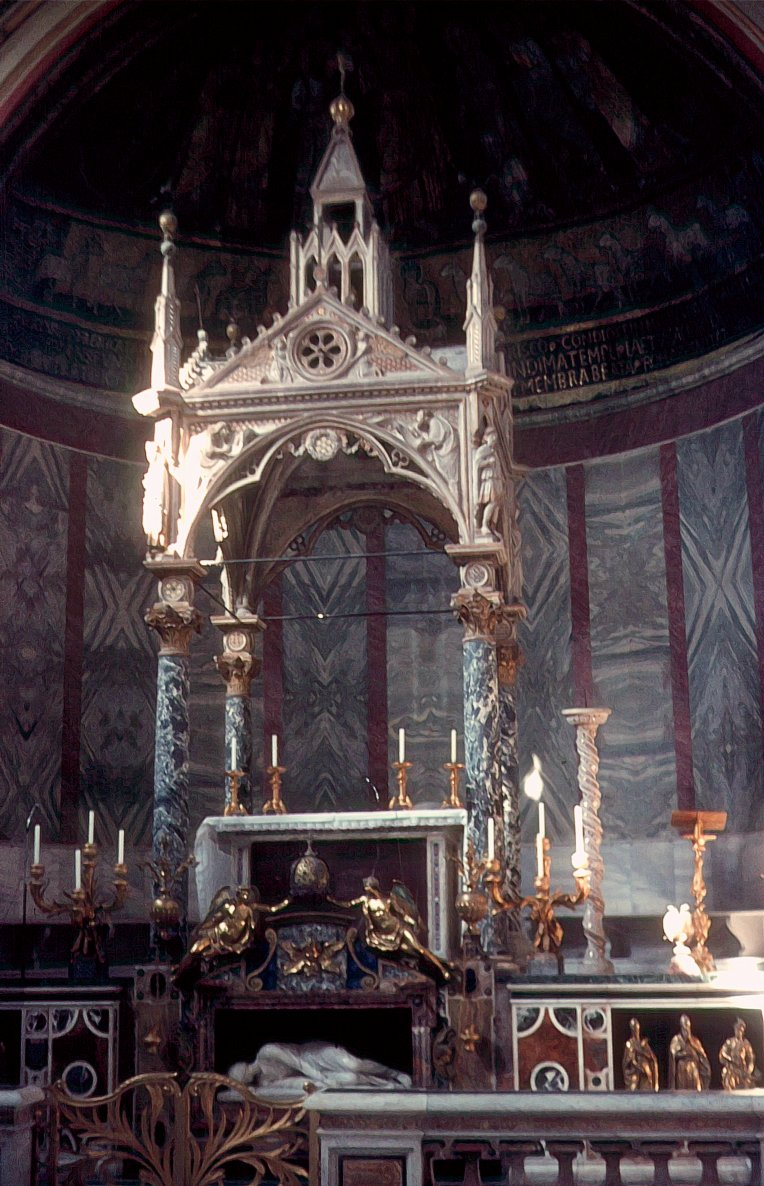
Altar of Santa Cecilia in Trastevere, Rome.

Then the priest invites those present to take part in the Penitential Act, of which the Missal proposes three forms, the first of which is the Confiteor. One form includes tropes acclaiming God's deeds on the parishioners' behalf, and the priest has some freedom in formulating these. This is concluded with the priest's prayer of absolution, "which, however, lacks the efficacy of the Sacrament of Penance," and absolves venial sins. "From time to time on Sundays, especially in Easter Time, instead of the customary Penitential Act, the blessing and sprinkling of water may take place as a reminder of Baptism." This ceremony, in which the congregation is cleansed with holy water, is known as the Asperges.

"After the Penitential Act, the Kyrie, Eleison (Lord, have mercy) is always begun, unless it has already been part of the Penitential Act. Since it is a chant by which the faithful acclaim the Lord and implore his mercy, it is usually executed by everyone, that is to say, with the faithful and the choir or cantor taking part in it." The Kyrie may be sung or recited in the vernacular language or in the original Greek. It is the only portion of the Mass in Greek instead of Latin or Latinised Hebrew.

"The Gloria in Excelsis (Glory to God in the highest) is a most ancient and venerable hymn by which the Church, gathered in the Holy Spirit, glorifies and entreats God the Father and the Lamb. ...It is sung or said on Sundays outside Advent and Lent, and also on Solemnities and Feasts, and at particular celebrations of a more solemn character." The Gloria is omitted at requiem Masses (funerals and Masses for the dead) on ordinary feast-days of saints, weekdays, and Votive Masses. It is also optional, in line with the perceived degree of solemnity of the occasion, at Ritual Masses such as those celebrated for Marriage ("Nuptial Mass"), Confirmation or Religious Profession, at Masses on the Anniversary of Marriage or Religious Profession, and at Masses for Various Needs and Occasions.

"Next the Priest calls upon the people to pray and everybody, together with the Priest, observes a brief silence so that they may become aware of being in God’s presence and may call to mind their intentions. Then the Priest pronounces the prayer usually called the “Collect” and through which the character of the celebration finds expression."

=== Liturgy of the Word ===
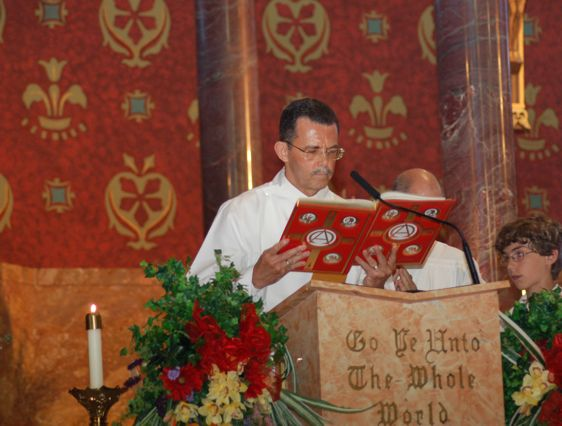
A deacon

On Sundays and solemnities, three Scripture readings are given. On other days there are only two. If there are three readings, the first is from the Old Testament (a term wider than Hebrew Scriptures, since it includes the Deuterocanonical Books), or the Acts of the Apostles during Eastertide. The first reading is followed by a Responsorial Psalm, a complete Psalm or a sizeable portion of one. A cantor, choir or lector leads, and the congregation sings or recites a refrain. "That the people may be able to sing the Psalm response more readily, texts of some responses and Psalms have been chosen for the various seasons of the year or for the various categories of Saints. These may be used in place of the text corresponding to the reading whenever the Psalm is sung." The second reading is from the New Testament, typically from one of the Pauline epistles. The reader begins most reading with the introductory statement "a reading from the Book of..." or "a reading from the Letter to...," and concludes each reading by proclaiming that the reading is "the word of the Lord,"; the congregation responds by saying "Thanks be to God." The lector will usually be a scheduled volunteer from among the congregation; when two non-Gospel readings are given, they may be given by two different lectors or by one, according to local preference.

The final reading and high point of the Liturgy of the Word is the proclamation of the Gospel. This is preceded by the singing of the Gospel Acclamation, typically an Alleluia with a verse of Scripture, which may be omitted if not sung. Alleluia is replaced during Lent by a different acclamation of praise. All stand while the Gospel is chanted or read by a deacon or, if none is available, by a priest. The reading is traditionally introduced with the phrase "a reading from the Holy Gospel according to" followed by the evangelist's name. To conclude the Gospel reading, the priest or deacon proclaims: "The Gospel of the Lord" and the faithful respond, "Praise to you, Lord Jesus Christ." The priest or deacon then kisses the book. If a deacon participates, he reads the Gospel. If a deacon is not present, the celebrating priest or a concelebrant, if there is one, proclaims it.

At least on Sundays and Holy Days of Obligation, a homily, a sermon that draws upon some aspect of the readings or of the liturgy, is then given. Ordinarily the priest celebrant himself gives the homily, but he may entrust it to a concelebrating priest or to the deacon, but never to a lay person. In particular cases and for a just cause, a bishop or priest who is present but cannot concelebrate may give the homily. On days other than Sundays and Holy Days of Obligation, the homily, though not obligatory, is recommended.

On Sundays and solemnities, all then profess their Christian faith by reciting or singing the Nicene Creed or, especially from Easter to Pentecost, the Apostles' Creed, which is particularly associated with baptism and is often used in Masses for children.

The Liturgy of the Word concludes with the Universal Prayer or Prayer of the Faithful. The priest begins it with a brief introduction, then a deacon, a cantor, or another lay person announces some intentions for prayer, to which the congregation responds with a short invocation such as "Lord hear our prayer." The priest concludes with a longer prayer.

=== Liturgy of the Eucharist ===
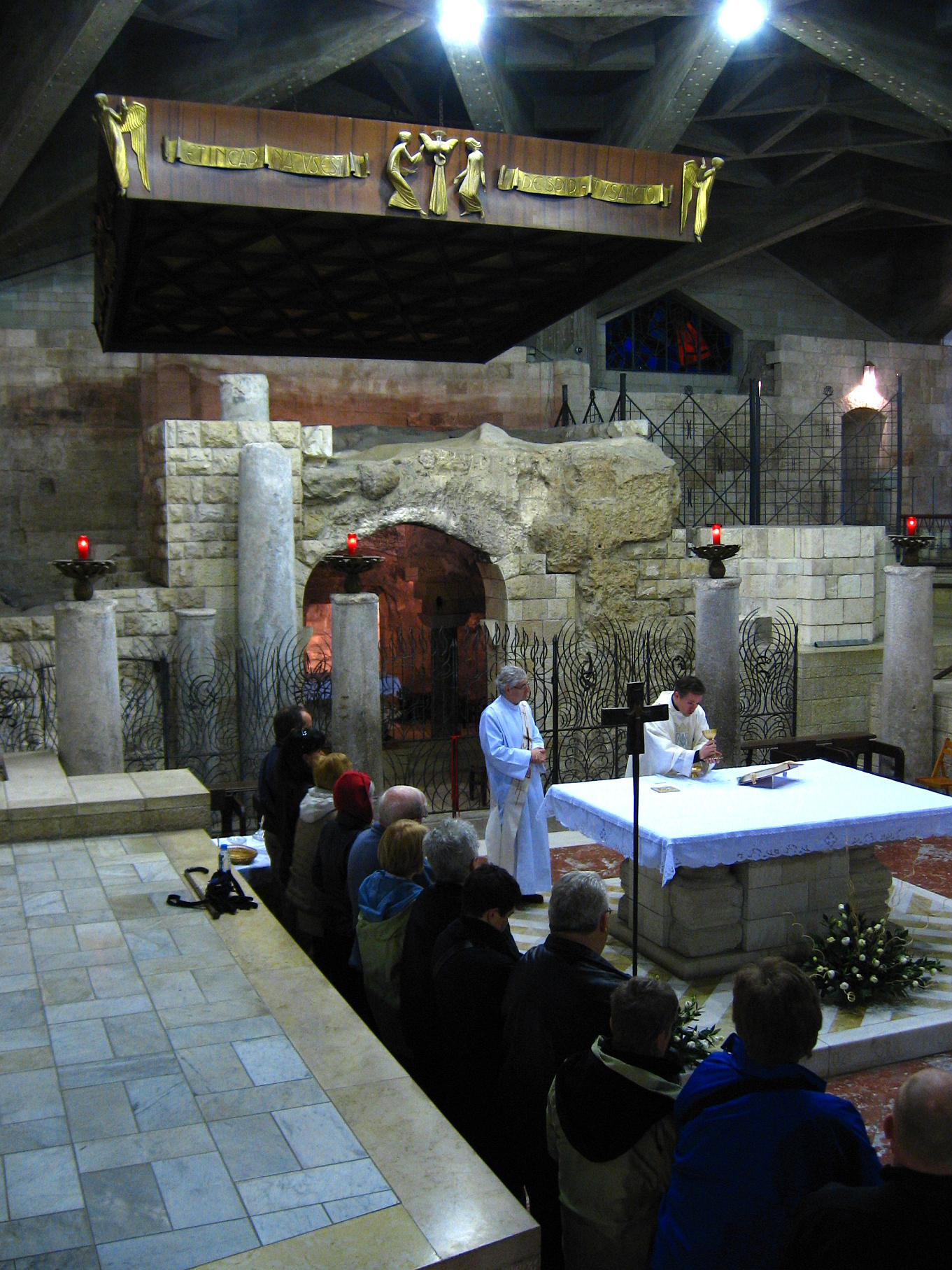
Mass in the Grotto of the Annunciation, Nazareth.

==== Preparation of the gifts ====
The linen corporal is spread over the center of the altar, and the Liturgy of the Eucharist begins with the ceremonial placing on it of bread and wine. These may be brought to the altar in a procession, especially if Mass is celebrated with a large congregation. The unleavened, wheat bread (in the tradition of the Latin Church) is placed on a paten, and the wine (from grapes) is put in a chalice and mixed with a little water. As the priest places each on the corporal, he says a silent prayer over each individually, which, if this rite is unaccompanied by singing, he is permitted to say aloud, in which case the congregation responds to each prayer with: "Blessed be God forever." Then the priest washes his hands, "a rite in which the desire for interior purification finds expression."

The congregation, which has been seated during this preparatory rite, rises, and the priest gives an exhortation to pray: "Pray, brethren, that my sacrifice and yours may be acceptable to God, the almighty Father." The congregation responds: "May the Lord accept the sacrifice at your hands, for the praise and glory of his name, for our good, and the good of all his holy Church." The priest then pronounces the variable prayer over the gifts.

==== Eucharistic Prayer (Anaphora) ====
The Eucharistic Prayer, "the centre and high point of the entire celebration", then begins with a dialogue between priest and the faithful. This dialogue opens with the normal liturgical greeting, "The Lord be with you", but in view of the special solemnity of the rite now beginning, the priest then exhorts the faithful: "Lift up your hearts." The faithful respond with: "We lift them up to the Lord." The priest then introduces the great theme of "Eucharist", a word originating in the Greek word for giving thanks: "Let us give thanks to the Lord, our God." The faithful join in this sentiment, saying: "It is right and just."

The priest continues with one of many thematic Eucharistic Prayer prefaces, which lead to the Sanctus acclamation: "Holy, Holy, Holy Lord God of hosts. Heaven and earth are full of your glory. Hosanna in the highest. Blessed is he who comes in the name of the Lord. Hosanna in the highest."

In some countries, including the United States, the faithful kneel immediately after the singing or recitation of the Sanctus. If a person is unable to kneel, he makes a profound bow after the Consecration – the Institution Narrative that recalls Jesus' words and actions at his Last Supper: "Take this, all of you, and eat of it: for this is my body which will be given up for you. ...Take this, all of you, and drink from it: for this is the chalice of my blood, the blood of the new and eternal covenant, which will be poured out for you and for many for the forgiveness of sins. Do this in memory of me." In many places, a consecrated bell is rung after the elevation of each element. The tradition of raising the host and chalice high after the Consecration has its origin in the ad orientem celebration of the Mass, and is done so that the people may more readily see the Host. It is also customary on solemnities and other days for the altar servers to offer incense to the Host and chalice during the elevation. The priest then announces: "The mystery of faith," and the faithful respond with an acclamation, using one of three prescribed formulae.

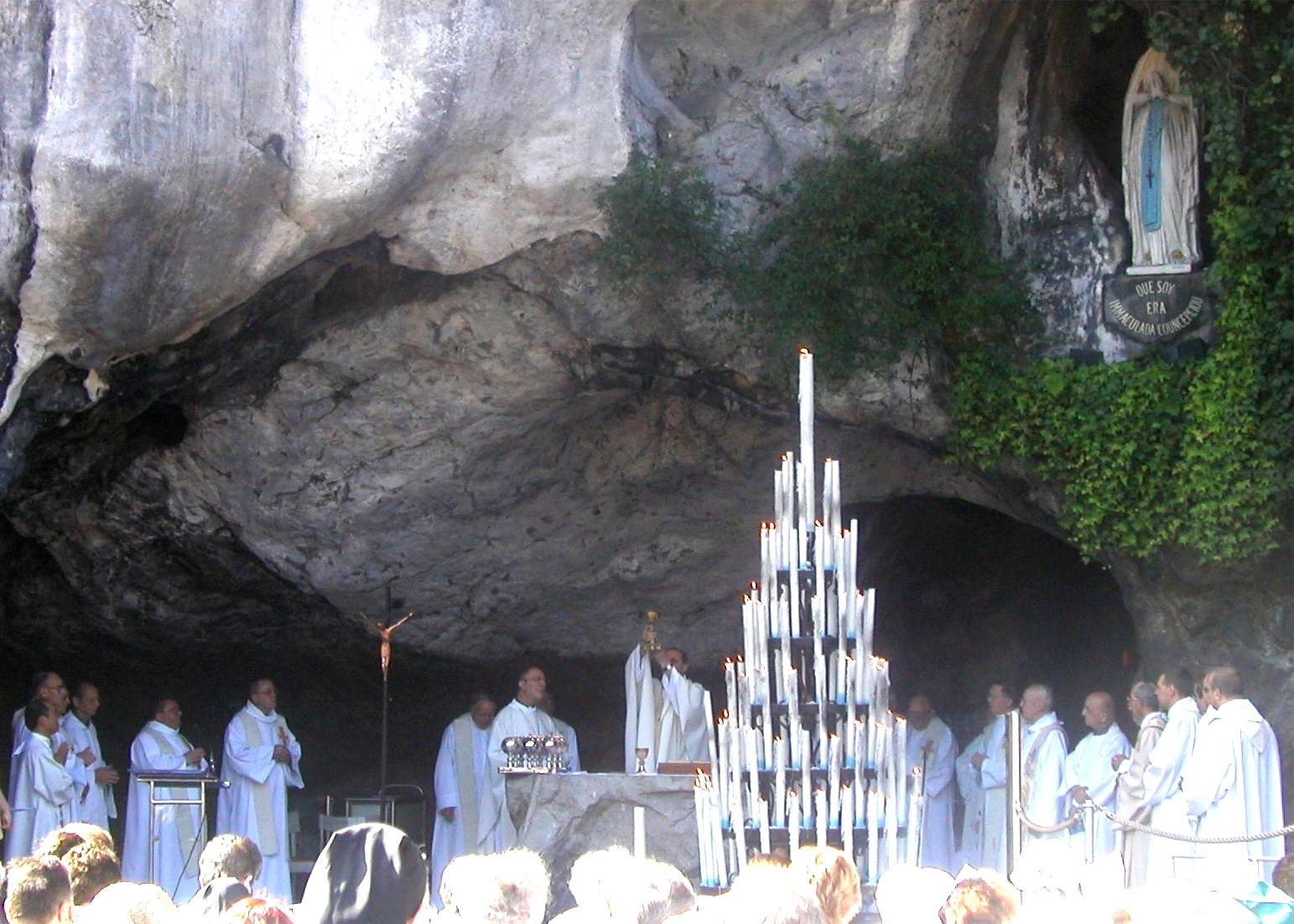
Mass at the Grotto at Lourdes. The chalice is displayed to the faithful immediately after the consecration of the wine.

The Eucharistic Prayer includes the Epiclesis (which since early Christian times the Eastern churches have seen as the climax of the Consecration), praying that the Holy Spirit might transform the elements of bread and wine and thereby the people into one body in Christ. The whole portion of the Antiphon recalling Christ's passion, death, and resurrection, is called the Anamnesis.

Intercessions for both the living and the souls in Purgatory follow. When there are priests concelebrating the Mass they join the main celebrant in the central prayers, up to the intercessions, which they may divide among themselves.

The Antiphon ends with an emphatic doxology for which the priest elevates the paten with the Host and the deacon (if there is one) elevates the chalice, and the priest(s) proclaim of Christ that "through him, with him, in him, in the unity of the Holy spirit, all glory and honor is yours, Almighty Father, for ever and ever," to which the faithful sing or chant the great Amen. This Amen is the faithful's assent to all that God has wrought through the consecration and representation of the sacrifice of Christ.

Both the doxology and Great Amen are preferably sung or chanted. This is in line with the Instruction on Music in the Liturgy which says: "One cannot find anything more religious and more joyful in sacred celebrations than a whole congregation expressing its faith and devotion in song. Therefore the active participation of the whole people, which is shown in singing, is to be carefully promoted. ...It should first of all include acclamations, responses to the greetings of the priest and ministers and to the prayers of litany form, and also antiphons and psalms, refrains or repeated responses, hymns and canticles."

==== Communion rite ====
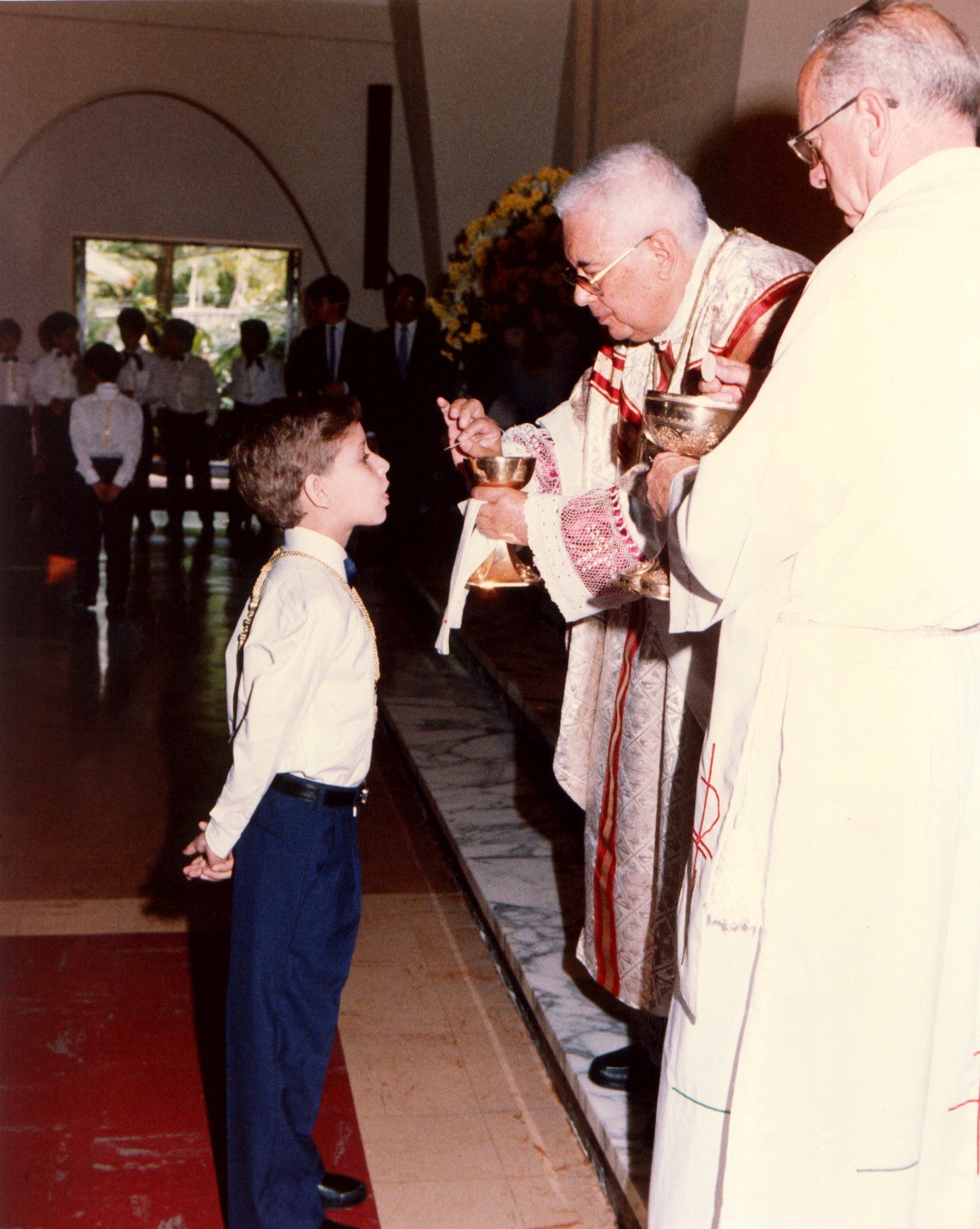
Reception of Holy Communion.

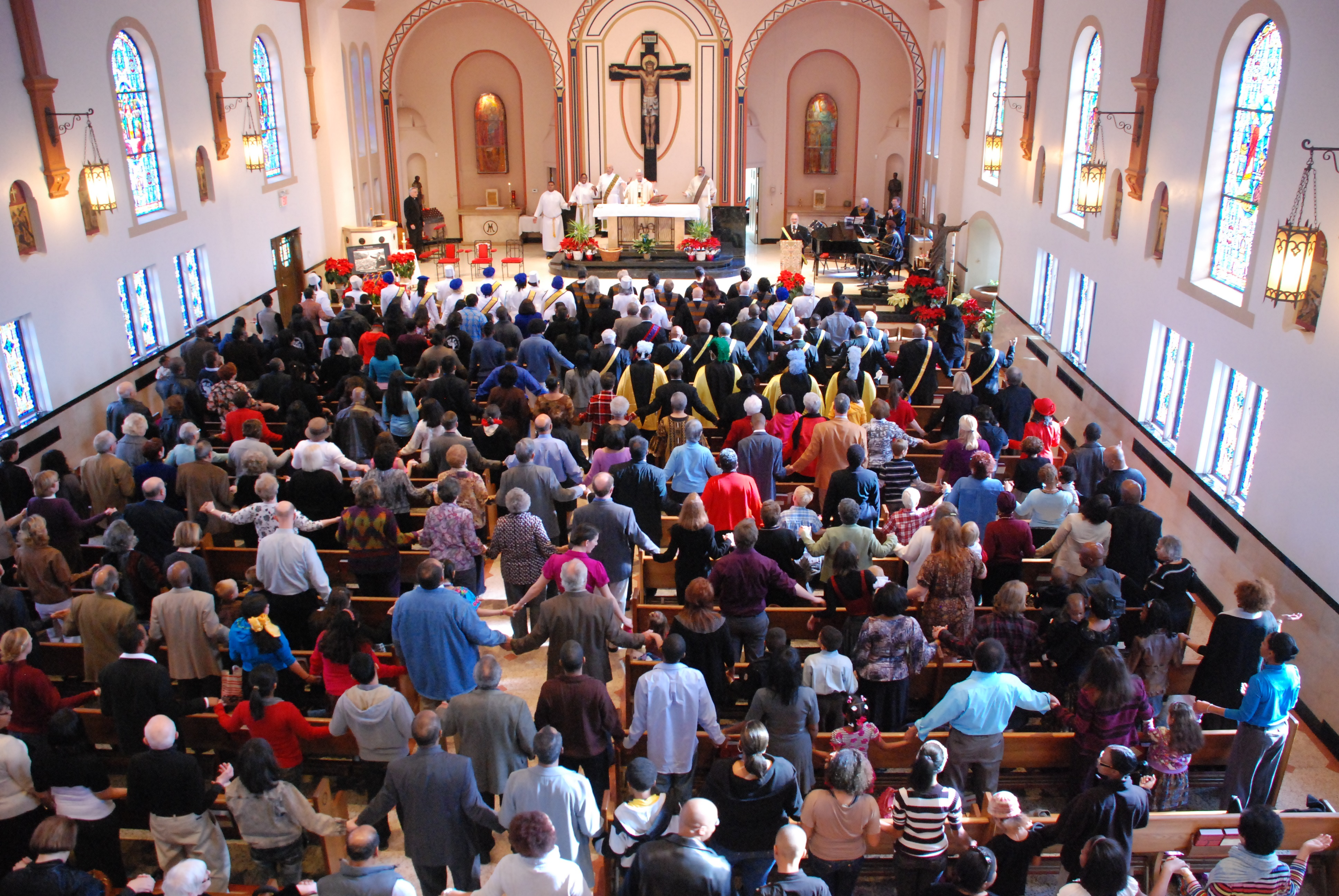
Hand-holding in an African-American parish in Oklahoma City.

The communion rite begins with a number of preparatory rites, of which the singing or recitation of the Our Father is the first. In the context of this preparation, the petitions for the daily bread and the forgiveness of trespasses gain particular significance. After an invitation by priest to do so, priest and people together recite the Lord's Prayer. The priest adds to it a development of the final petition, known as the embolism: "Deliver us, Lord, we pray, from every evil, graciously grant peace in our days, that, by the help of your mercy, we may be always free from sin and safe from all distress, as we await the blessed hope and the coming of our Savior, Jesus Christ." The faithful then recite the doxology, "For the kingdom, the power, and the glory are yours, now and forever".

During the joint recitation of the Lord's Prayer the priest is exceptionally directed to extend his hands in the orans position. In the liturgy, the priest normally adopts this posture only when praying aloud and alone while the congregation is silent. Other prayers said by the priest with the people, like the Sanctus in every Mass, are said with joined hands. This exception was introduced by Pope Pius XII, who only in the context of his Holy Week liturgical reforms permitted the congregation to join the priest in praying the Pater noster, provided that they could pray it in Latin. In some locations members of the congregation have either adopted the orans posture like the priest or have held each other's hands. The United States bishops conference states: "No position is prescribed in the Roman Missal for an assembly gesture during the Lord's Prayer." Some recognized experts on the rubrics of the Roman Rite, the liturgists Edward McNamara and Peter Elliott, deplore the adoption of handholding by the congregation as a body, and both are subject to controversy.

The Rite of Peace, the pax, is the second preparatory rite for reception of Holy Communion. After praying: "Lord Jesus Christ, who said to your Apostles: Peace I leave you, my peace I give you; look not on our sins, but on the faith of your Church, and graciously grant her peace and unity in accordance with your will. Who live and reign for ever and ever," the priest wishes the faithful the peace of Christ: "The peace of the Lord be with you always." The deacon or, in his absence, the priest may then invite those present to offer each other the sign of peace. The form of the sign of peace varies according to local custom for a respectful greeting (for instance, a handshake or a bow between strangers, or a kiss/hug between family members).

The third preparatory rite is that of fraction and commingling. The priest breaks the host and places a piece in the main chalice; this is important as it symbolizes that the Body and Blood of Christ are both present within one another. Meanwhile, the "Lamb of God" ("Agnus Dei" in Latin) is sung or recited.

The priest then presents the Eucharistic Bread to the congregation, saying: "Behold the Lamb of God, behold him who takes away the sins of the world. Blessed are those who are called to the supper of the Lamb." Then all repeat: "Lord, I am not worthy that you should enter under my roof, but only say the word and my soul shall be healed," which is a reference in the Gospel of Matthew to where a Roman centurion manifests exemplary faith in Jesus to heal his servant, saying that Jesus' word alone was sufficient. The priest then receives Communion. Following this, if extraordinary ministers of Holy Communion are required, they may come forward at this time, and approach the priest, presenting themselves for Communion. With the help of the deacon and concelebrants and, if necessary, extraordinary ministers of Holy Communion, the priest then distributes Communion to the faithful.

According to the Catholic Church doctrine receiving the Holy Communion in a state of mortal sin is sinful and only those who are in a state of grace, that is, without any mortal sin, can receive it. Based on 1 Corinthians 11:27–29 it affirms the following: "Anyone who is aware of having committed a mortal sin must not receive Holy Communion, even if he experiences deep contrition, without having first received sacramental absolution, unless he has a grave reason for receiving Communion and there is no possibility of going to confession."

The faithful receive Communion kneeling or standing, as decided by the Episcopal Conference. For instance the version of the General Instruction of the Roman Missal used by the United States Conference of Catholic Bishops says that "Holy Communion is to be received standing, unless an individual member of the faithful wishes to receive Communion while kneeling. When receiving Holy Communion, the communicant bows his or her head before the Sacrament as a gesture of reverence and receives the Body of the Lord from the minister," while that used by the Catholic Bishops' Conference of England and Wales says: "In the dioceses of England and Wales Holy Communion is to be received standing, though individual members of the faithful may choose to receive Communion while kneeling. However, when they communicate standing, it is recommended that the faithful bow in reverence before receiving the Sacrament."

The distributing minister says "The Body of Christ" or "The Blood of Christ", or "The Body and Blood of Christ" if both are distributed together (by intinction). The communicant responds: "Amen." In most countries the communicant may receive the consecrated Host either on the tongue or in the hand, at the communicant's own discretion. If in the hand they should step aside and reverently consume the Host immediately.

While Communion is distributed, singing of an appropriate approved chant or hymn is recommended, to emphasize the essentially "communitarian" nature of the body of Christ. If there is no singing, a short antiphon may be recited either by the congregation or by some of them or by a lector. Otherwise, the priest himself recites it just before distributing Communion.

"The sacred vessels are purified by the priest, the deacon, or an instituted acolyte after Communion or after Mass, insofar as possible at the credence table." Then the priest concludes the Liturgy of the Eucharist with the Prayer after Communion, for which the faithful are invited to stand.

=== Concluding rite ===
Any announcements may given after the Prayer after Communion: the Missal says that these should be brief. The liturgy concludes with a dialogue between the priest and the assembly, during which the priest gives the usual liturgical greeting and imparts his blessing. The deacon, or in his absence, the priest himself then dismisses the faithful. The 2011 edition of the Missal adds new versions of the dismissal.

The faithful respond: "Thanks be to God." The priest and other ministers then venerate the altar with a kiss, form a procession, and exit the sanctuary, preferably to a recessional hymn or chant from the Graduale, sung by all. Some practices will include a Marian antiphon (e.g. Angelus, Hail Mary etc) before the recessional hymn.

Once Mass is over, people may depart or stay awhile, pray, light votive candles at shrines in the church, converse with one another, etc. In some countries, including the United States, the priest customarily stands outside the church door to greet the faithful individually as they exit.

== Time of celebration of Mass ==
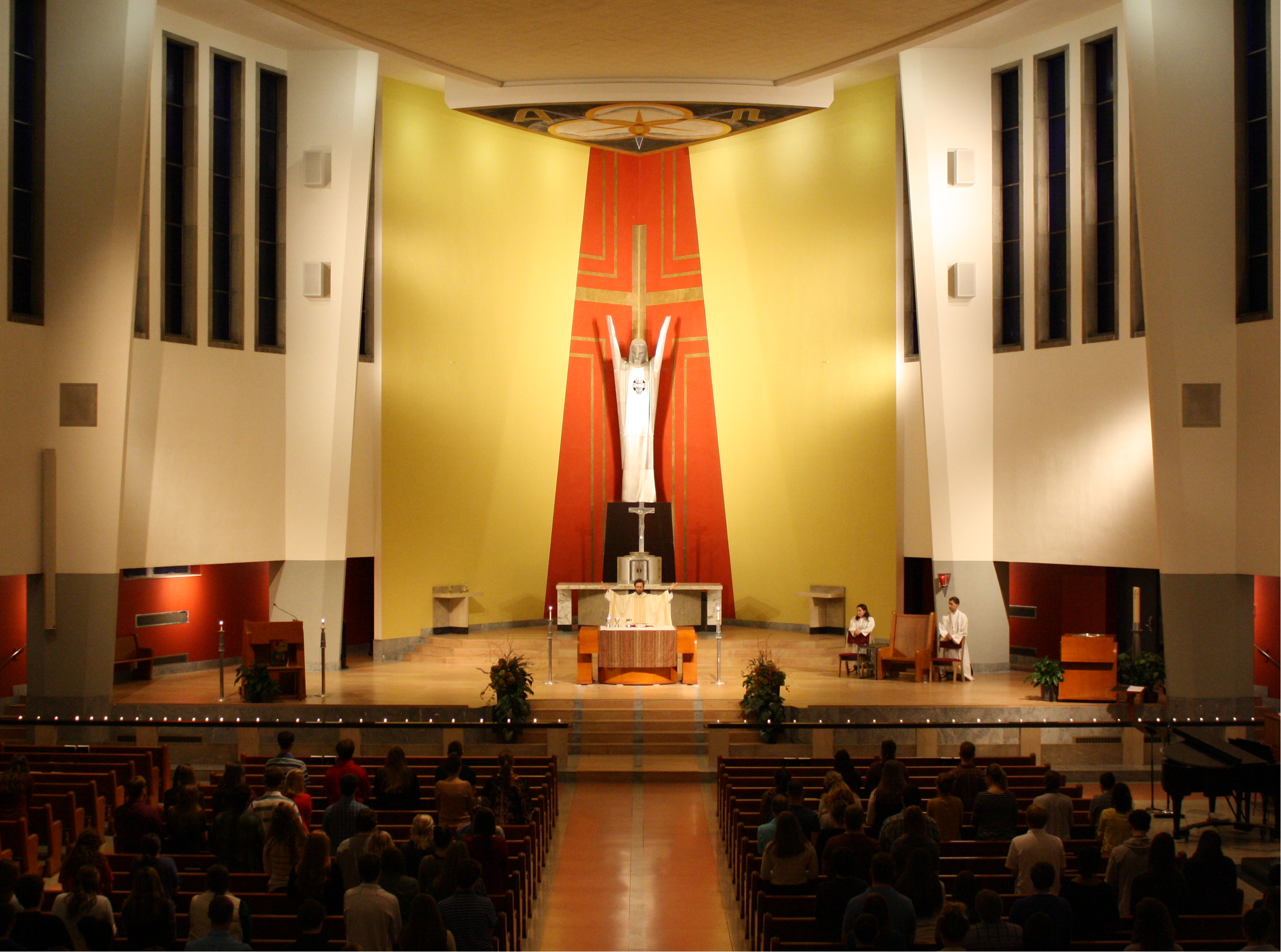
Sunday night student Mass at Rockhurst University in Kansas City, Missouri.

Except during the Paschal Triduum no limits are set for the time of celebrating Mass. The traditional rule included in the 1917 Code of Canon Law, forbidding (except to a limited extent on Christmas Night) celebration earlier than one hour before dawn or later than one hour after midday, was relaxed in the liturgical reforms of Pope Pius XII and completely abolished in those of the Second Vatican Council.

Since the Second Vatican Council, the time for fulfilling the obligation to attend Mass on Sunday or a holy day of obligation begins on the evening of the day before, and most parish churches do celebrate the Sunday Mass also on Saturday evening. By long tradition and liturgical law, Mass is not celebrated at any time on Good Friday. On Holy Saturday, no Mass may be celebrated before the Easter Vigil—the beginning of the celebration of Easter Sunday—which is customarily begun only after sunset, completing the Easter Triduum which began on Thursday).

Priests are required to celebrate Mass frequently and are earnestly recommended to do so daily. However, "apart from those cases in which the law allows him to celebrate or concelebrate the Eucharist a number of times on the same day, a priest may not celebrate more than once a day," and "a priest may not celebrate the Eucharistic Sacrifice without the participation of at least one of the faithful, unless there is a good and reasonable cause for doing so."

The bishop of a diocese and the pastor of a parish are required to celebrate (or arrange for another priest to celebrate)—on every Sunday and holy day of obligation—a Mass "pro populo", that is, for the faithful entrusted to his care.

For Latin Church priests, there are a few general exceptions to the limitation to celebrate only one Mass a day. By tradition, they may celebrate Mass three times on Christmas Day (the Midnight Mass or "Mass of the Angels", the Dawn Mass or "Shepherd's Mass", and the Day Mass or "Mass of the Divine Word", each of which has its own readings and chants).

On All Souls' Day they may also, on the basis of a privilege to all priests by Pope Benedict XV in August 1915, celebrate Mass three times; only one of the three Masses may be for the personal intentions of the priest, while the other two Masses must be for all the faithful departed and for the intentions of the Pope. A priest who has concelebrated the Chrism Mass, which may be held on the morning of Holy Thursday, may also celebrate or concelebrate the Mass of the Lord's Supper that evening. A priest may celebrate or concelebrate both the Mass of the Easter Vigil and Mass of Easter Sunday (the Easter Vigil "should not begin before nightfall; it should end before daybreak on Sunday"; and may therefore take place at midnight or in the early hours of Easter morning). Finally, a priest who has concelebrated Mass at a meeting of priests or during a pastoral visitation by a bishop or a bishop's delegate, may celebrate a second Mass for the benefit of the laity.

In addition to these general permissions, the Local Ordinary may, for a good reason, permit priests to celebrate twice (they are then said to "binate") on weekdays, and three times ("trinate" or "trination") on Sundays and Holy Days (canon 905 §2). Examples would be if a parish priest were to need to celebrate the usual, scheduled daily Mass of a parish and a funeral later in the morning, or three Masses to accommodate all of the parishioners in a very populous parish on Sundays. In particularly difficult circumstances, the Pope can grant the diocesan bishop permission to give his priests faculties to trinate on weekdays and quadrinate on Sundays.

In many countries, the bishop's power to permit priests to celebrate two or three Masses on one day is widely used, and it is common for priests assigned to parish ministry to celebrate at least two Masses on any given Sunday, and two Masses on several other days of the week. Permission for four Masses on one day has been obtained in order to cope with large numbers of Catholics either in mission lands or where the ranks of priests are diminishing. This sometimes also happens in the case of historic churches which are unusually small compared to their number of parishioners, but which have not been replaced due to their historic character.

=== Summary table regarding priests with pastoral responsibilities ===
Situation	Masses permitted	Masses required*
Normal weekday	1	0
Normal Sunday	1	1
Sunday, for just reasons**	2	1
All Souls' Day	3	1
Christmas Day***	3	1
Weekday with permission of Local Ordinary	2	0
Sunday or Holy Day with permission of Local Ordinary	3	1
Weekday with permission of the Pope through Local Ordinary	3	0
Sunday or Holy Day with permission of the Pope through Local Ordinary	4	1

* By any priest of a parish for the people; that is to say, individual priests are not required to say Masses on these days per se, but a Mass in each parish or oratory must be available for the people.
** According to the pastor's own judgment.
*** By longstanding custom, this includes the First Mass of Christmas "during the night", even if it begins somewhat earlier than midnight.

== Duration of the celebration ==
The time it takes to celebrate Mass varies considerably. While the Roman Rite liturgy is shorter than other liturgical rites, it may on solemn occasions take over an hour and a half. The length of the homily is an obvious factor that contributes to the overall length. Other factors are the number of people receiving Communion and the number and length of the chants and other singing.

For most of the second millennium, before the twentieth century brought changes beginning with Pope Pius X's encouragement of frequent Communion, the usual Mass was said exactly the same way whether people other than a server were present or not. No homily was given, and most often only the priest himself received Communion. Moral theologians gave their opinions on how much time the priest should dedicate to celebrating a Mass, a matter on which canon law and the Roman Missal were silent. One said that an hour should not be considered too long. Several others said that, in order to avoid tedium, Mass should last no more than half an hour; and in order to be said with due reverence, it should last no less than twenty minutes. Another theologian, who gave half an hour as the minimum time, considered that Mass could not be said in less than a quarter of an hour, an opinion supported by others, including Saint Alphonsus Liguori who said that any priest who finished Mass in less than that time could scarcely be excused from mortal sin.

== Ritual Masses ==
A Mass celebrated in connection with a particular rite, such as an ordination, a wedding, or a profession of religious vows, may use texts provided in the "Ritual Masses" section of the Roman Missal. The rite in question is, most often, a sacrament, but the section has special texts not only for Masses within which Baptism, Confirmation, Anointing of the Sick, Holy orders, and Matrimony are celebrated, but also for Masses with religious profession, the dedication of a church, and several other rites. Penance is the only sacrament not celebrated within a Eucharistic framework and for which therefore no Ritual Mass is provided.

The Ritual Mass texts may not be used, except perhaps partially, when the rite is celebrated during especially important liturgical seasons or on high ranking feasts.

A Nuptial Mass is a Ritual Mass within which the sacrament of matrimony is celebrated. If one of a couple being married in a Catholic church is not a Catholic, the rite of matrimony outside Mass is to be followed. However, if the non-Catholic has been validly baptized, then, in exceptional cases and provided the bishop of the diocese gives permission, it may be considered suitable to celebrate the marriage within Mass, except that, according to the general law, Communion is not given to the non-Catholic (Rite of Marriage, 8). The Nuptial Mass contains special prayers for the couple and, in the ordinary form of the Roman Rite, may be offered at any time of the liturgical year, except during the Paschal Triduum.

== Mass intentions ==
It is customary for Mass to be celebrated with a particular intention in mind. The intention may be related to a donation given by a member of the church and paid to the officiating priest as a Mass stipend. Code of Canon Law, canon 945 states that

In accordance with the approved custom of the Church, any priest who celebrates or concelebrates a Mass may accept an offering to apply the Mass for a specific intention.

== See also ==
- Mass (liturgy)
- Mass (music)
