= Triple candlestick (Catholic Church) =

Catholic altar candlestick

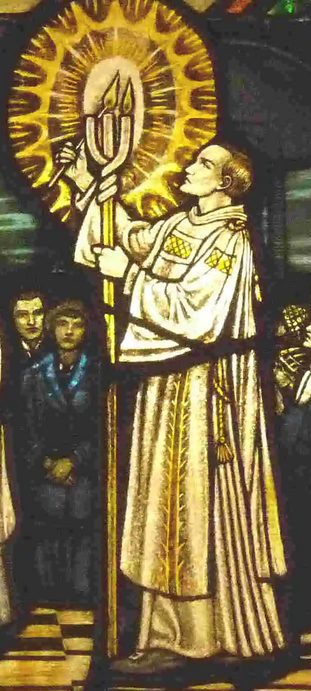
Triple candlestick being lit, in Margaret Agnes Rope's stained glass Lumen Christi.

A triple candlestick, also known as reed, tricereo, arundo, triangulum, or lumen Christi, was a liturgical object prescribed until 1955 in the Roman Rite Easter Vigil service, held on Holy Saturday morning.

In the Easter Vigil service, the deacon or priest lights each of its three candles in succession, chanting each time in ascending tones, "Lumen Christi" ("The light of Christ"), to which the choir answers "Deo gratias" ("Thanks be to God"). From one of the candles on the triple candlestick, the Paschal candle is afterwards lit during the chanting of the Exsultet.

In 1955 the triple candlestick was abolished in the liturgical reforms of Pope Pius XII. Since then, the Paschal candle is lit directly from the Paschal fire at the beginning of the Easter Vigil mass.
