= Liturgical reform =

Liturgical reform may refer to:

- Carolingian liturgical reform in the 8th-9th centuries
- the liturgical reforms of Pope Pius XII
- Sacrosanctum Concilium, the Constitution on Sacred Liturgy of the Second Vatican Council, whose objective was liturgical reform
- the liturgical reforms of Pope Paul VI, which implemented the changes made by the Second Vatican Council
