= Presanctified =

Presanctified may refer to:

- Divine Liturgy of the Presanctified Gifts, Byzantine Rite liturgical service on the weekdays of Great Lent
- Mass of the Presanctified, Catholic and Anglican liturgy traditionally celebrated on Good Friday

== See also ==
- Sanctification
