= Easter Proclamation =

Easter Proclamation may refer to:

- The Exsultet, a Christian hymn intoned by the deacon during the Easter Vigil in western-rite churches.
- The Proclamation of the Irish Republic, issued during the Easter Rising in Ireland.
