= Lumen Christi =

Easter versicle sung in Christian churches

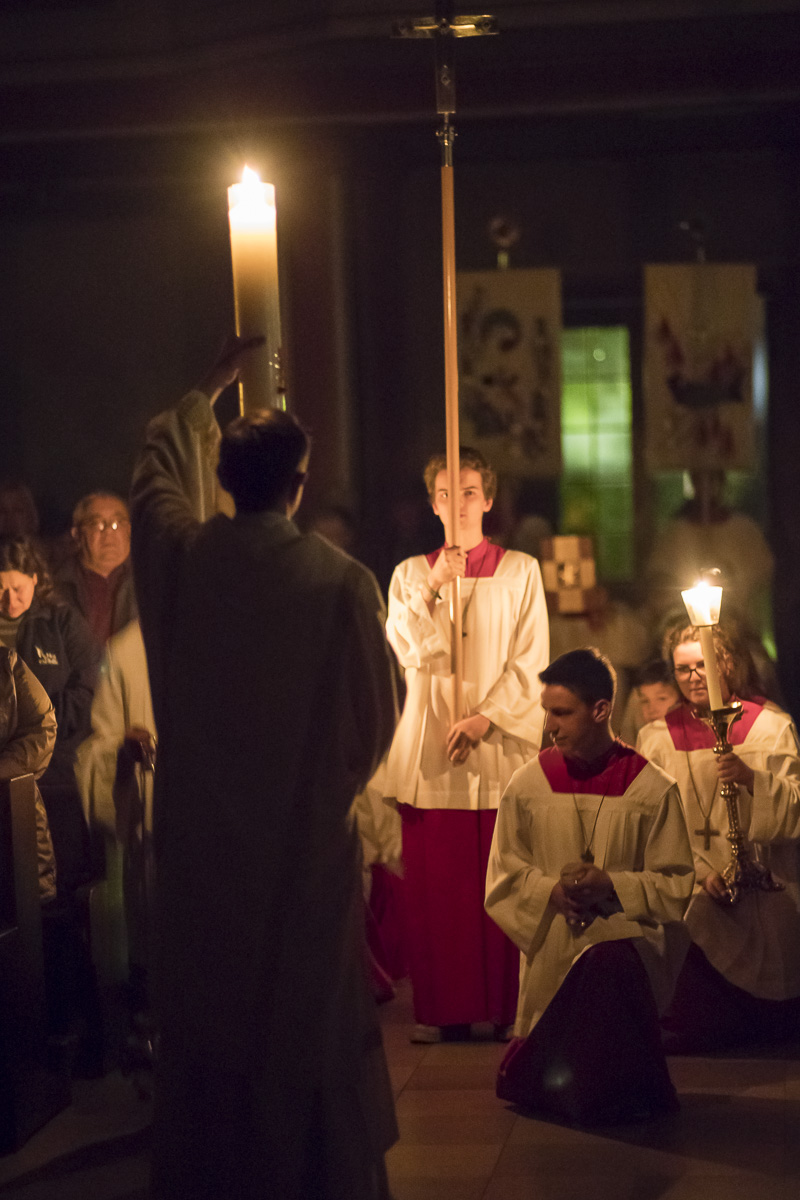
A deacon raises the candle while singing the Lumen Christi.

Lumen Christi (Latin for "Light of Christ") is a versicle sung in Catholic, Lutheran and some Anglican churches as part of the Easter Vigil. In Lutheran and Anglican services, it is sung in the local language. It is chanted by the deacon on Holy Saturday as he lights the candle. In the English Sarum Rite, one candle is lit.

== Details ==
In the Catholic service, after the new fire has been blessed outside the church, a light is taken from it by an acolyte. The procession moves up the church toward the altar, the deacon in a white Dalmatic carrying the candle. Three times the procession stops, the deacon lights one of the candles from the taper and sings, Lumen Christi, on one note (fa, in the Solfege system), dropping a minor third (to re) on the last syllable. The choir answers, Deo gratias to the same tone. Each time it is sung at a higher pitch. As it is sung, all genuflect. Having arrived at the altar, the deacon begins the blessing of the Paschal Candle (Exsultet).

== History and variations ==
From time to time, a light must be brought from the new fire to the Paschal candle. The ceremony grew from this practical need and later acquired symbolic meaning.

At first, a triple candle was likely a precaution against the light blowing out on the way. At one time there were only two lights. The Sarum Consuetudinary (about the year 1210) says: "Let the candle upon the reed be lighted, and let another candle be lighted at the same time, so that the candle upon the reed can be rekindled if it should chance to be blown out". A miniature of the eleventh century shows the Paschal Candle being lighted from a double taper. Triple candles appeared first in the twelfth and fourteenth Ordines Romani, about the twelfth century. Father Thurston suggests a possible connection between it and the old custom of procuring the new fire on three successive days. But precaution against the light blowing out accounts for several candles. The mystic symbolism of the number three applied, too.

Guillaume Durand, in his chapter on the Paschal Candle, does not mention a triple candle. In the Sarum Rite, only one candle was lighted. While it was carried in procession to the Paschal Candle, a hymn, Inventor rutili dux bone luminis, was sung by two cantors, the choir answering the first verse after each of the others. In the Mozarabic Rite, the bishop lights and blesses one candle; while it is brought to the altar an antiphon, Lumen verum illuminans omnem hominem, etc., is sung. In Milan, in the middle of the Exultet, a subdeacon goes out and brings back a candle lit from the new fire without any further ceremony. He hands this to the deacon, who lights the Paschal Candle (and two others) from it, and then goes on with the Exultet.

== Works based upon ==
The Roman three-part version of the Lumen Christi, with its repetitions in ascending half-steps, is the basis for the dramatic organ work Incantation pour un jour saint ("Incantation for a holy day", 1949) by Jean Langlais, a favorite Easter postlude.

== Other uses ==
Lumen Christi is also the name of several Catholic convents, high schools, and of the German religious community Gemeinschaft Lumen Christi.

Schools using the name include:

- Lumen Christi College (Derry, Northern Ireland)
- Lumen Christi College (Martin, Australia)
- Lumen Christi Catholic High School (Michigan, United States)
