= Pittance =

Small gift

Pittance (through Old French pitance and from Latin pietas, loving-kindness) is a gift to the members of a religious house for masses, consisting usually of an extra allowance of food or wine on occasions such as the anniversary of the donor's death, festivals, or other similar occasions. The word was early transferred to a charitable donation and to any small gift of food or money.

== See also ==
- Tithe
- Mass stipend – gift to a priest for saying mass
