= Mass of the Presanctified =

Catholic and Anglican liturgy on Good Friday

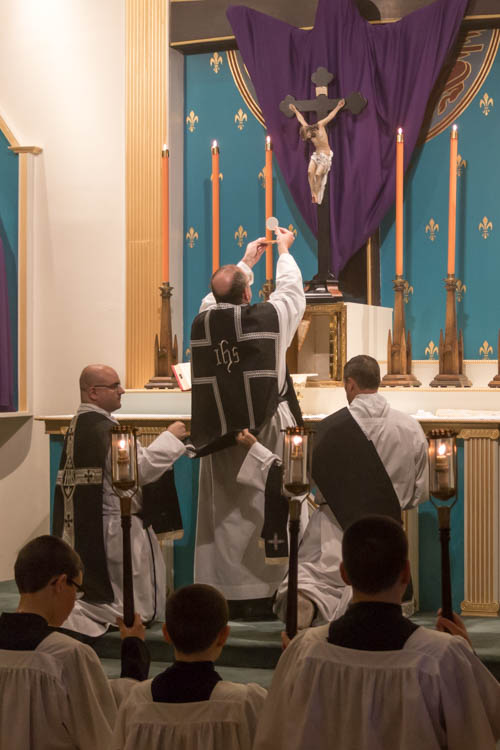
Elevation at a Solemn Mass of the Presanctified, celebrated in the 1954 rite

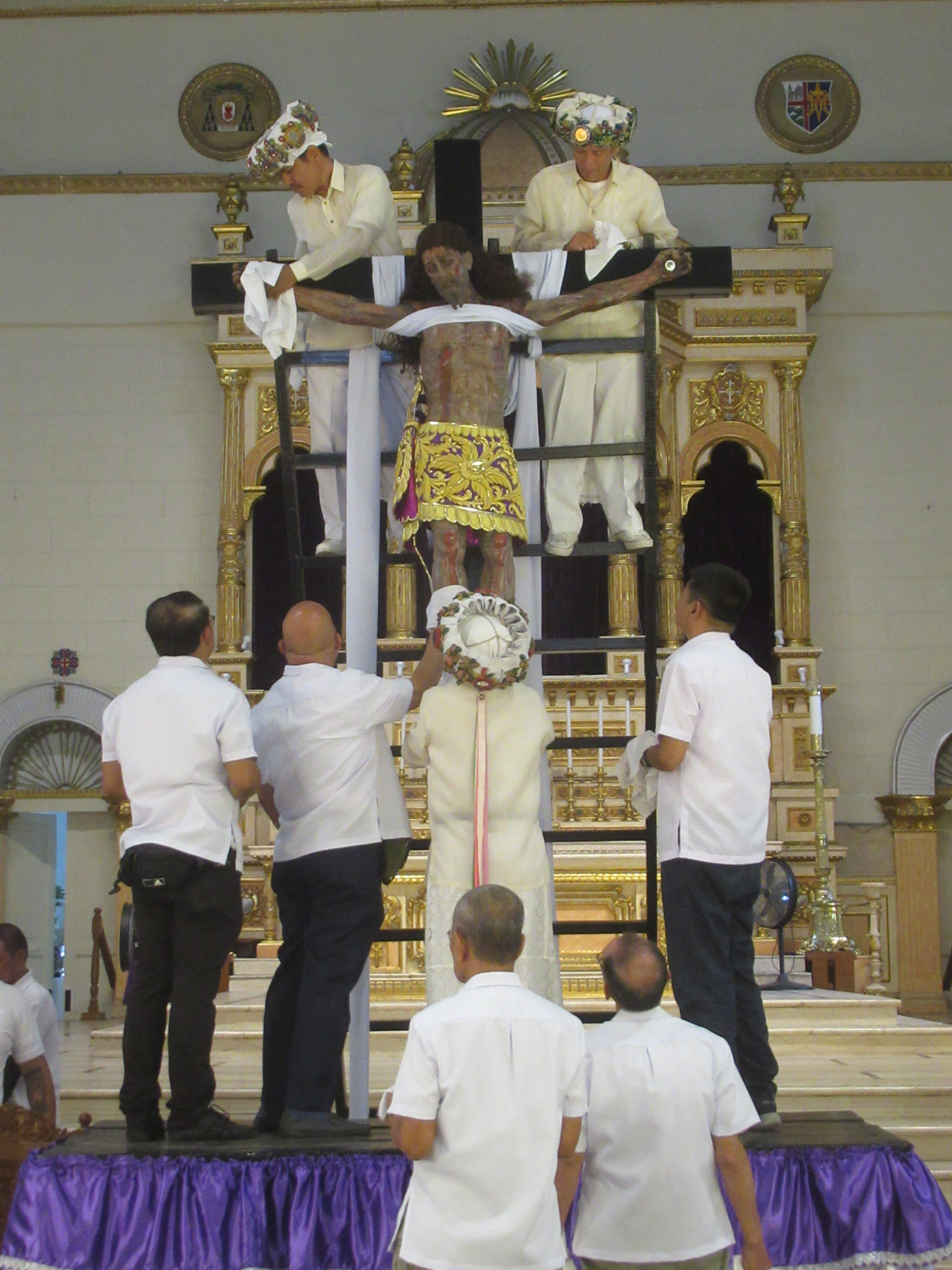
Descent from the Cross rite (Baliwag Church 2024)

The Mass of the Presanctified (Latin: missa præsanctificatorum, Greek: leitourgia ton proegiasmenon) is Christian liturgy traditionally celebrated on Good Friday in which there is no consecration of the Eucharist. Instead, the Blessed Sacrament already consecrated at Mass on an earlier day and reserved is distributed at the Communion.

The liturgy had developed by the time of the Quinisext Council (also the Second Trullan Synod, 692). In the Roman and Anglican Rites it is used only on Good Friday, while in some Old Catholic Rites, it is used on both Good Friday and Holy Saturday.

In both the Ordinary Form and the Extraordinary Form of the Roman Rite, the term "Mass of the Presanctified" is not used in the Missal and other liturgical books to refer to this liturgy. It has instead been titled Solemn Afternoon Liturgy of the Passion and Death of the Lord (Solemnis actio liturgica postmeridiana in Passione et Morte Domini) since the 1955 reforms of Pope Pius XII. It is also called the Solemn Commemoration of the Lord's Passion.

The Divine Liturgy of the Presanctified Gifts is used in the Eastern Orthodox Church and in Eastern Catholic Churches which follow the Byzantine Rite only on the weekdays (Monday through Friday) of Great Lent, and on Holy Monday through Holy Wednesday during Holy Week. At each of these Presanctified Liturgies, the Sacred Mysteries (Blessed Sacrament) would have been consecrated the previous Sunday.

== See also ==
- Missa Sicca
- Eucharistic adoration
- Eucharistic reservation
