= Funeral dues =

Funeral dues, under the 1917 Code of Canon Law, were the payments that are due to a priest under canon law for celebrating a Roman Catholic funeral. There also existed the right for a quarter of the funeral costs to accrue to the parish priest of the dead person if the person was buried away from the parish, which was known as the quarta funeralis.

== See also ==
- Mass stipend
