= Bination =

Bination, with reference to the liturgy of the Roman Catholic Church, is the offering up of the Holy Sacrifice of the Mass twice on the same day by the same celebrant.

== History ==
It is believed by some that even from Apostolic Age, private Mass was celebrated whenever convenient. Be this as it may, it is certain that in the first years of Christianity, public Masses were offered on Sundays only and later on Wednesdays and Fridays also. To these three days Saturday was added, especially in the East. Augustine of Hippo, who died in 430, assures us that while, in his time, Mass was celebrated only on Sundays in some places, in others on Saturdays and Sundays, it was nevertheless in many places customary to have the Holy Sacrifice daily, in Spain, in Northern Italy, in Constantinople, as well as elsewhere.

Daily Mass became universal about the close of the sixth century. It was not long before priests began to celebrate the Holy Sacrifice two, three or more times daily, according to their own desire, until canons imposed a limit. Pope Alexander II (d. 1073) decreed that a priest should be content with saying Mass once a day, unless it should be necessary to offer a second - never more - for the dead. Notwithstanding this legislation, the practice continued of celebrating more often on some of the greater feasts: thus on 1 January one Mass was said of the Octave of the Nativity of Christ, another in honour of the Blessed Virgin; three Masses were said by bishops on Holy Thursday, in one of which sinners were reconciled to the Church, a second for the Consecration of the Oils, and a third in keeping with the feast; two Masses were said on the Vigil of the Ascension, as well as on the feast itself; three Masses were celebrated on Easter, and three also on the Nativity of Saint John the Baptist. On the feast of Sts. Peter and Paul the pope said one Mass in the basilica of St. Peter and a second in that of St. Paul Outside-the-Walls. Finally, abolishing all these customs, Pope Innocent III (d. 1216) prescribed that a simple priest should say but one Mass daily, except on Christmas, when he might offer the Holy Sacrifice three times; while Pope Honorius III (d. 1227) extended this legislation to all dignitaries. This then is the discipline of both the Eastern and Western Churches.

== Exceptions ==
Moral theology permits a priest to say two Masses on Sundays and Holy Days of obligation in case of necessity when, namely, a number of faithful would otherwise be deprived of the opportunity of hearing Mass. This would be verified, for example, were a priest in charge of two parishes or missions with no other celebrant available, or were the church too small to accommodate at one time all the parishioners. The ordinary of the diocese, however, is to judge, in these and similar cases, of the necessity of binating. For similar cause, Rome grants to priests of missionary countries the privilege of saying two Masses.

As regards permission to binate, theologians are agreed that it should not be given unless about thirty persons would otherwise be put to notable inconvenience to avoid missing Mass. In certain extraordinary cases this number is reduced to twenty, while, if there is question of those detained in prison or bound by the laws of the papal cloister, from ten to fifteen inmates will suffice to permit bination. In such cases a priest is permitted to say a second (never a third) Mass only in case another celebrant may not be had; that a stipend may not be accepted for the second Mass; that the ablutions are not to be taken at the first Mass, as this would break the fast prescribed. A celebrant who is to say two Masses in the same church uses the same chalice for both, not purifying it at the first Mass. If the second Mass is to be said in a different church, the celebrant immediately after the Last Gospel of the first Mass returns to the centre of the altar, consumes whatever drops of the Precious Blood may still remain in the chalice, and then purifies the chalice into a glass on the altar, is consumed together with the second ablution of a subsequent Mass, or emptied into the sacrarium. It might even be given to a lay person who is in the state of grace and fasting, as is done with the water in which the priest's fingers are cleansed, when Holy Communion is given to the sick. The chalice thus purified at the end of the first Mass may be used for the second Mass or not, as the celebrant may see fit.

Pope Benedict XIV (d. 1758) conceded to all priests, secular and regular, of the kingdoms of Spain and Portugal the privilege of saying three Masses on All Souls' Day (2 November). This privilege still holds for all places which belonged to one or other of these lands at the time when it was granted. The ordinary stipend is allowed for one only of these Masses; while the other two must be offered for all the souls in Purgatory.

== Current Law ==
The current Code of Canon Law is similar. Can. 905 (1) A priest is not permitted to celebrate the Eucharist more than once a day except in cases where the law permits him to celebrate or concelebrate more than once on the same day. (2) If there is a shortage of priests, the local ordinary can allow priests to celebrate twice a day for a just cause, or if pastoral necessity requires it, even three times on Sundays and holy days of obligation.

Two exceptions granted by the Church by liturgical law are: (1) three Masses allowed on Christmas and (2) three Masses allowed on All Souls’ Day. Ordinarily, the three Masses on Christmas should be celebrated in accordance with the rubrics of the Sacramentary and Lectionary; i.e., at midnight, at dawn, and during the day; also at the vigil. The latest rubrics allow “any priest” to offer these three (plus the vigil Mass) provided that he follow the sequence and time indicated in the Roman Missal. On All Souls’ Day, each of the three Masses allowed must be offered for the intentions indicated in the rubrics for All Souls’ Day; the first, for a particular intention; the second for all the faithful departed; the third for the intentions of the Pope.
