= Missa sicca =

Medieval Catholic liturgical rite

The Missa sicca (Latin for 'dry Mass') was a form of Catholic devotion used in the medieval Catholic Church when a full Mass could not be said, such as for funerals or marriages in the afternoon after a priest had already said Mass earlier that morning. It consisted of all components of the Mass except the Offertory, Consecration and Communion. (Durandus, "Rationale", IV, i, 23).

Specific types of Missa sicca included Missa nautica, said at sea in rough weather, and Missa venatoria, said for hunters in a hurry. In some monasteries each priest was also obliged to say a dry Mass after the conventual Mass.

The dry Mass was "still current custom" in the sixteenth century. Following the reforms of Pope Pius V (d. 1572), it gradually disappeared, but was still sufficiently active that Giovanni Bona (Cardinal from 1670) still argued against the practice of saying dry Masses (Rerum liturg. libr. duo, I, xv).

== See also ==
- Typica
- Viaticum
- Mass of the Presanctified
- Missa bifaciata
