= Liturgical reforms of Pope Pius XII =

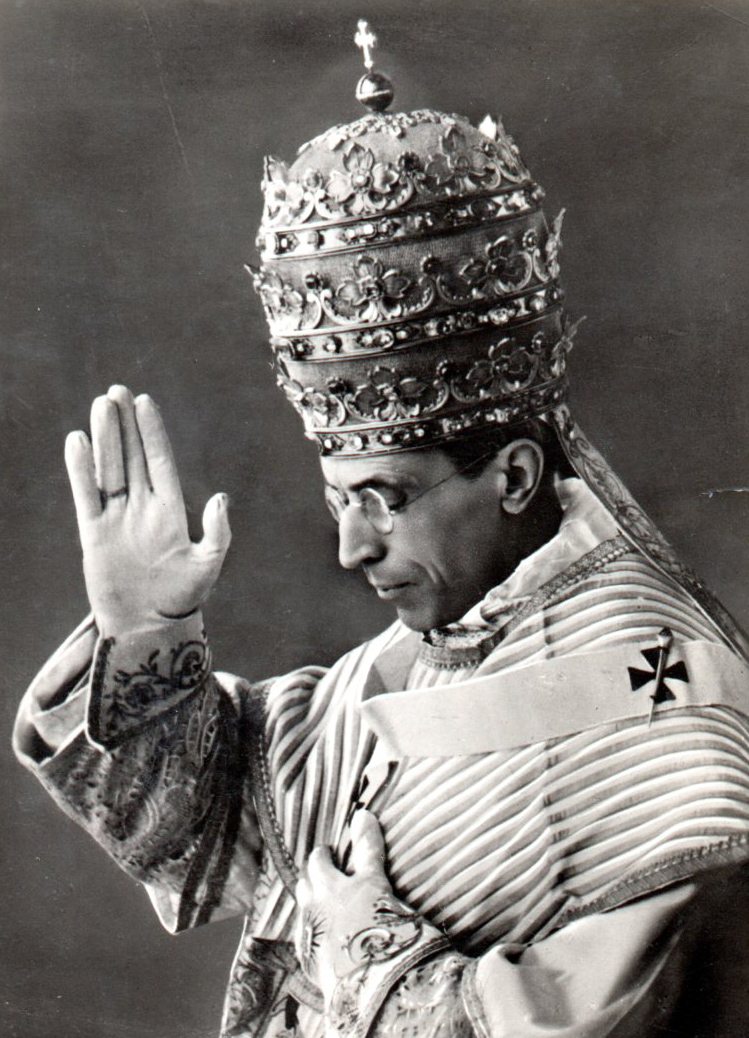
Pope Pius XII, 1939

The liturgical reforms of Pope Pius XII took place mostly between 1947 and 1958.

== Background ==
The celebration of the resurrection of Jesus Christ has been celebrated since the 2nd and 3rd century as Vigil, that is, night watch, celebrated on the night of Easter Sunday, from which the name Easter Night or Easter Vigil derived. In two successive phases, a nocturnal mourning phase and a morning joy phase with Easter Eucharistic celebration, the saving action of God is remembered for man. In the following centuries came a baptism service from the 4th century and a light celebration from the 6th and 7th century.

Since the 4th century, the Easter celebration unfolded into a Triduum with a focus on the memory of the suffering and death of Jesus (Maundy Thursday, Good Friday and Holy Saturday) and a second as a memory of the resurrection (Easter Sunday to Easter Tuesday). Since late antiquity, the individual days and their liturgical celebrations have become independent.

The liturgy of the Easter Vigil as a Night Watch lasted several hours. Over time, the number of adult baptisms continued to decline, and the duration of the vigil shortened from the 6th century; finally, the celebration of Easter Vigil ended before midnight. The donation of baptism was omitted, the consecration of baptismal water remained. From the 8th century, the celebration began under Gallic influence earlier in the evening, in the afternoon and finally already in the morning of Holy Saturday. The requirement that the vigil could only begin after None was met by also moving None forward. The Matins for Holy Saturday already began on the evening of Good Friday. This initially occurred with the Church's tacit approval, until Pope Pius V made it a requirement and prohibited evening Masses on Easter Vigil. In the Roman Missal of 1570, the Easter Vigil was defined as follows: Blessing of the Fire – Service of Light – Liturgy of the Word (Old Testament) – Blessing of the Baptismal Waters – Liturgy of the Word (New Testament) – Eucharist – Vespers. Since 1570, the time for the only Holy Mass on Holy Thursday has also been in the morning.

== Groundwork ==
On 20 November 1947, Pius XII issued the encyclical Mediator Dei. It included the statement: "the use of the mother tongue in connection with several of the rites may be of much advantage to the people", while reaffirming the normativity of Latin.

== Eucharistic fast ==
Pius XII changed the requirements for fasting before receiving communion in two stages. In 1953, by the apostolic constitution Christus Dominus, he continued to require not ingesting from midnight before receiving communion, but ruled that water did not break the fast. He also relaxed the fasting requirement for the sick and travelers, those engaged in exhausting physical labor, and priests who celebrate several Masses on the same day. In 1957, with Sacram Communionem, he replaced the fast from midnight with a three-hour fast from solid food and alcohol and a one-hour fast from other liquids. Ordinary communicants would calculate the time until the moment they took communion; priests fasted based on the time they began saying Mass. The new fasting rules opened the way to scheduling evening Masses, which the fast from midnight regime made all but impossible for those desiring to receive communion.

== Use of the vernacular ==
Permission for the use of the vernacular for parts of the Mass had been granted on occasion long before the papacy of Pius XII; including in 1906 by Pius X (parts of Yugoslavia), Benedict XV in 1920 (Croatian, Slovenian, and Czech), Pius XI in 1929 (Bavaria).

Under Pius XII, the Sacred Congregation of Rites granted permission for the use of local languages in countries with expanding Catholic mission activities, including in Indonesia and Japan in 1941–2. In 1949 permission was granted for using Mandarin Chinese in Mass except for the Canon, and for the use of Hindi in India in 1950. Permission was also granted to use a French (1948) and German (1951) translation for rituals other than Mass.

As a means of increasing the participation of the congregation in the celebration of Mass, recognizing that joining in chant is not possible at a Mass that is "read" rather than sung, in 1958 Pius approved the use of hymns in the vernacular at appropriate points in the service. As a means to closer awareness by the congregation he also allowed the epistle and gospel to be read aloud by a layman while the celebrant read them quietly in Latin.

Though insisting on the primacy of Latin in the liturgy of the Western Church (cf. Mediator Dei, par. 60), Pius XII approves the use of the vernacular in the Ritual for sacraments and other rites outside the Mass. All such permissions, however, were to be granted by the Holy See, and Pius XII strongly condemned the efforts of individual priests and communities to introduce the vernacular on their own authority. He allowed the use of the vernacular in other rites and sacraments outside the Mass, in the service for Baptism and Extreme Unction.

== Liturgical propers and other directives ==
Following in the footsteps of his predecessors, Pius XII instituted a number of new feasts and approved new propers. After defining the Dogma of the Assumption in 1950, a new mass formula (the mass Signum magnum) was introduced for the feast, which falls on August 15. Pius XII also instituted the feast of the Immaculate Heart of Mary, which he established as a double of the second class and fixed to August 22, the octave day of the Assumption. Other new feasts included the feast of the Queenship of Mary (May 31) and the feast of Saint Joseph the Worker (to coincide with the socialist holiday of May 1), which thus replaced the Feast of Saint Joseph Patron of the Universal Church, observed until then (from 1870) as a movable feast on the third Wednesday after Easter.

The Sacred Congregation of Rites had jurisdiction over the Rites and ceremonies of the Latin Church such as Holy Mass, sacred functions and divine worship. It issued the location of the blessed sacrament within the Church, to be always at the main altar in the centre of the Church. The Church should display religious objects, but not be overloaded with secondary items or even Kitsch. Modern sacred art should be reverential and still reflect the spirit of our time. Since 1946, priests may officiate confirmations in certain instances.

== Easter Vigil ==
In 1951 on an experimental basis (ad experimentum), and then permanently in 1956, Pope Pius XII introduced the Easter Vigil, a celebration of Easter night based on restoration of ancient forms. He moved the time of the celebration to after sunset and restructured the service. The Paschal candle is the center of the service of new fire, rather than a three-branched candle of medieval origin which had existed only for use in this service; members of the congregation light their own candles as well, a participatory innovation. The water is blessed in front of the congregation, not at the baptismal font. Among many detailed changes, only four of the traditional Old Testament readings were kept. Then followed only the first part of the Litany of the Saints and possible baptisms. A major innovation occurred with the incorporation of renewal of baptismal promises by the entire congregation, "a milestone" that introduced modern languages into the general Roman liturgy for the first time.

His re-introduction of the Easter Vigil was generally popular, although it faced a cool reception from some prelates. Cardinal Spellman of New York considered asking for a dispensation from performing the new Easter Vigil rite, but relented. Another assessment saw initial enthusiasm that lasted only a few years and concluded that only novelty had attracted attention in the first years. Other Christian denominations adopted the popular Roman Catholic Easter ceremonies in later years, an ecumenical influence of Pius XII.

== Reform of the Holy Week ==
By far, the most significant of the liturgical reforms carried out under the pontificate of Pius XII was the reforms to the Holy Week ceremonies, between 1951 and 1956. During the 19th century, the resurrection celebration on the morning of Holy Saturday had been increasingly perceived as inappropriate. On the one hand, the early time of the celebration led to the fact that the resurrection celebration was in the middle of the day of the actual burial of Christ, on the other hand, despite the Easter jubilation, the Holy Mass continued fasting, because the Easter fasting ended only at noon. In addition, the faithful could not usually participate in the morning services of the Sacred Triduum, because those days were no longer celebrated as holidays, as in the Middle Ages, but had become normal working days since the beginning of modern times. As a result, Pope Urban VIII crossed the Triduum Sacrum off the list of public holidays. The most important celebrations in the church year now often took place as pure cleric services

Already in the 1930s, there were therefore attempts at the community level to relade the resurrection celebration back to Easter Vigil. Important impulses came from the liturgical scientific research, especially from the Maria Laach Benedictine Odo Casel. In the 1940s, the concern was presented to Pope Pius XII who commissioned the Congregation for the Rites in 1946 to revise the Ordo Hebdomadae Sanctae, the liturgical order for the Holy Week. On February 9, 1951, a decree was issued to restore the Easter Vigil, Dominicae resurrectionis vigiliam. The regulations initially applied "ad experimentum" for one year, in 1952 they were extended for a further three years. On November 16, 1955, the Rite Congregation issued the General Decree Maxima redemptionis nostrae mysteria, which reformed the entire liturgy of the Holy Week. It took effect on Palm Sunday 1956.

Liturgical colors

| | Before 1956 | Between 1956 and 1969 | After 1969 |
|---|---|---|---|
| Palm Sunday | Violet | Blessing of palms and procession; red, Celebration of the Mass; violet | Red |
| Maundy Thursday | White | White (Violet stole during the stripping of the altar) | White |
| Good Friday | Black (white humeral veil for the procession of the Blessed Sacrament | Albe and black stole, to the intercessions black pluviale, white shoulder vellum for the procession with the Blessed Sacrament, violet for the communion service | Red |
| Easter Vigil | Violet; deacon wears white during "Lumen Christi" and chanting of the Exsultet, white for the celebration of the Mass | Violet, deacon wears white during "Lumen Christi" and chanting of the Exsultet, white, after the blessing of the baptismal water and for the celebration of the Mass | White |

=== Times of Services ===
| | Before Pius XII reforms | After Pius XII reforms |
|---|---|---|
| Palm Sunday | In the morning | Palm consecration and procession before the main service; where a procession is not possible, a word service can be held separately on the subject of the messianic entry of Christ. |
| Holy Thursday | The Tenebrae was celebrated on Wednesday evening; the Mass of the Lord's Supper was celebrated in the morning. Chrism Mass with blessing of holy oils | In the evening, starting no earlier than 5 pm, and no later than 8 p.m. (if necessary twice), if necessary additionally in the morning; Chrism Mass in the bishop' church in the morning, but can also be celebrated on an earlier day in Holy Week |
| Good Friday | in the morning (Matins already celebrated on the evening of Maundy Thursday) | around 3 pm, for pastoral reasons also later, but not after 6 p.m. |
| Easter Vigil | on the morning of Holy Saturday (Metten already on the evening of Good Friday}; Lenten fasting and abstinence ends typically at 12 pm (noon) | at night; beginning not before dark, not ending after dawn on Sunday; beginning of the holy mass ideally at midnight |

== Holy Week rites ==
In 1955, Pius XII promulgated new liturgies for Holy Week in the decree Maxima Redemptionis (November 19, 1955). In addition to the new Easter Vigil, modified on an experimental basis in 1951 and now made permanent, he promulgated the rites for Palm Sunday, Holy Thursday and Good Friday, the most important ceremonies in the Roman liturgy. The Holy Thursday Mass of the Lord's Supper was moved from morning to evening to replicate more closely the experience of the historical Last Supper and the Good Friday liturgy similarly moved to the afternoon.

=== Palm Sunday ===
Palm Sunday was now called Dominica II Passionis seu in palmis, "Second Passion Sunday or Palm Sunday". However, the term Second Passion Sunday did not prevail. Since 2002 it has been called Dominica in palmis de Passione Domini, "Palm and Passion Sunday".

The palm procession received a greater weight than the blessing of the palms. The number of genuflections for the blessings was reduced and the consecration preface with a "Sanctus" was completely omitted. Until 1955, the blessing of the palms was a Missa sicca (dry Mass), and took place in the middle of the high altar or on its epistle side. After 1955, this took place in a different place than the subsequent Mass, for example in a chapel; the palm procession moved from there to the church. If this was not possible, the blessings of the palms in the church should take place at the credence table, the palm procession should take a longer path from there (per aliquam viam longiorem), preferably outside the church room. In addition, and notably, red was given as the liturgical color for blessing of palms and procession to emphasise the kingship of Christ. For the Mass, the liturgical color remained violet until the Second Vatican Council, when the entire liturgical celebration would be in red.

In the blessing prayer regarding the branches, the narrowing to the palm branches (palmarum rami) or olive branches (olivarum rami) which are only available in the Mediterranean region was waived, and if necessary the blessing "these branches" (hos arborum ramos) applied. When entering the church, there was no three knocks with the shaft of the now no longer purple-veiled lecture cross on the closed church door. The reading of the Passion was also shortened. However, in the past the Passion for Matthew was always recited, since 1969 the Passion of one of the Synoptic Gospels has been read, depending on the reading year.

=== Monday, Tuesday and Wednesday of Holy Week ===
The prayers "Against the Persecutors of the Church" ("Contra persecutores Ecclesiae") and "For the Pope" in the Mass celebrations of Monday during Holy Week were abolished.

Before 1956, on Tuesday of Holy Week and on Wednesday of Holy Week, the readings begin with the Last Supper from Mark 14:1–31 and Luke 22:1–39. Both of these readings were abolished in the Holy Week reforms of Pius XII.

=== Maundy Thursday ===
The changing of the washing of feet (Mandatum), to during the Mass of the Last Supper, was the most notable change; before that it took place "at the appropriate hour": in the morning or separately after the morning Holy Mass and the stripping of the altar. This ritual is mandatory in episcopal and abbey churches, but since the reform can also be celebrated in parish churches. The reform of 1955 was still based on the foot washing of twelve men.

A homily is now also to be held in the evening mass. Furthermore, during the Gloria, just as in the Easter Vigil, the bells should be rung; in places with several churches, however, the bells of all churches should ring at the same time as in the cathedral or main church. In the case of Agnus Dei, the third invocation also ends with Miserere nobis "Have mercy on you", the following prayer of the priest Domine Jesu Christe, qui dixisti, also the peace kiss, which had already been omitted before the reform of Pius XII. The discharge formula is, as in other masses, where a continuation follows, instead of Ite missa est Benedicamus Domino. The final blessing and the last gospel were omitted from the Pius XII reforms.

Private masses have been prohibited on Maundy Thursday, since the reforms. The consecration of the holy oils in Cathedral Churches are no longer part of the Mass of the Last Supper; instead being carried out during the Chrism Mass on the morning of Holy Thursday. The oil consecration (like the palm consecration on Palm Sunday) no longer takes place at the high altar, but at a credenz.

The tabernacle is to be empty, the hosts for the celebrations on Maundy Thursday and the Liturgy on Good Friday are consecrated in the Mass of the Last Supper. For the transfer of the Blessed Sacrament, not only a single host is used anymore, but the ciborium with the consecrated hosts, covered with a veil, is transferred in procession to a repositioning altar in a chapel or a side altar of the church. Previously, it was customary for the priest to place the host for Good Friday in the chalice, which he covered with an inverted paten and the pall. The chalice was enclosed with a corporal, which was fixed with a ribbon around the chalice, and remained on the altar until it was transferred to the repositioning altar. Therefore, the Holy Mass from communion, was according to the liturgical rules of a Mass before the abandoned altar: the priest genuflected, when he walked in front of the middle of the altar; when he turned to the congregation to the formula of dismissal and to the final blessing, he did so not in the middle of the altar, but from the Gospel side, so as not to turn his back on the Blessed Sacrament. These rules were abolished with the reform.

After the reform, the clerics prayed the Vespers. Following this, the altars were stripped by the celebrant in alb and violet stoles with his assistance, "undressed"; Psalm 22 was spoken, with the antiphon "They have divided my clothes among themselves and thrown the lot over my robe." The altar cloths and every ornament was removed, only a veiled crucifix and some chandeliers remained on the altar, or have also been removed. Then the altars were washed with wine and water. This rite marked the beginning of the time without Mass celebration and recalled the loneliness and abandonment of Jesus and his exposure at the beginning of the Passion. Since the Second Vatican Council, the exposure only takes place after the conclusion of the celebration, the washing has been omitted.

According to the instruction belonging to the decree, the worship of the Blessed Sacrament at the Repositioning Altar (so-called Mount of Olives) is to last at least until midnight; at this time, the memory of the institution of the Eucharist is replaced by, the memory of the Passion of Jesus. The equipment of the place of reposition is supposed to be of "serious simplicity", the worship after midnight "without any solemnity"

=== Good Friday ===
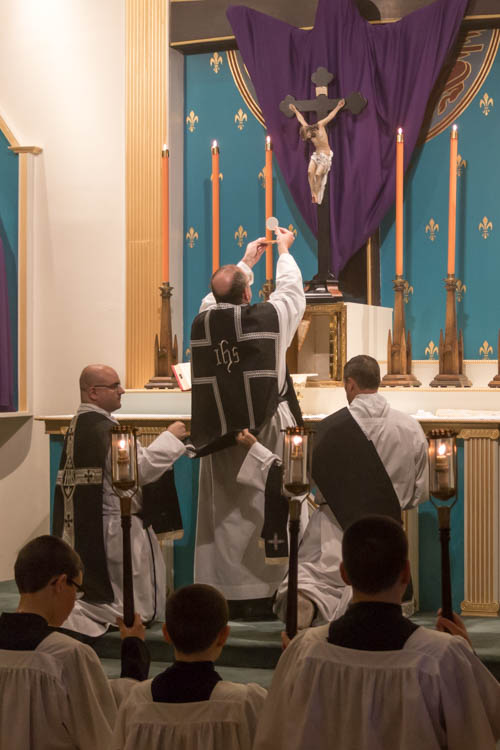
Elevation of the Eucharist at a Solemn Mass of the Presanctified, celebrated in the 1954 rite

Feria Sexta in Parasceve ("Friday at Parasceve", i.e. "on the day of preparation") was renamed to Feria Sexta in Passione et Morte Domini ("Friday of the Passion and Death of the Lord"). The structure of the Good Friday Liturgy readings remained the same. No incense is used in the celebration of the suffering and death of Christ. After the introductory prostration, a prayer is said. The altar is only covered with an altar cloth during the Solemn Prayers, and no candlesticks are present on the altar, as was the case prior to the reforms.

Notably during the Solemn Prayers, a genuflection was added to the prayer for the conversion of the Jews; while the text remained the same in 1956, the word perfidis was later removed in 1959, and further changes to the prayer occurred in 1965 and again in 1970. Also, the prayer "For the Heretics and Schismatics'' was renamed to "For the unity of the Church", though that prayer remained the same, until the liturgical changes of the Second Vatican Council.

During the adoration of the cross, a crucifix is carried into the altar by a deacon or priest, accompanied by two altar servers with candlesticks. Before the reform, the veiled crucifix and the chandeliers stood on the altar as in the previous Passion season, the crucifix was brought from the altar for the worship of the cross, revealed and brought back there after the adoration of the cross. The Adoration of the Cross, was simplified in that instead of three double genuflections, three simple genuflections were performed. The use of a purple cushion with a white linen cloth symbolizing the grave cloth, on which the cross was placed during the worship of the cross, is also omitted in the new celebration of the suffering and death of Christ. The crucifix is kept during the veneration of two acolytes or altar servers or even the celebrant himself, who stand in the middle facing the altar steps of the congregation. Instead, candlestick holders, can also accompany the adoration of the cross. Then, at the beginning of the footfalls, the candlestick holder places the candlesticks next to the crucifix and remain kneeling to the right and left. Before the reform, the chandeliers remained on the altar and were set on fire towards the end of the worship of the cross, before the procession with the Blessed Sacrament. That the celebrant and his assistant to cross worship take off their shoes is no longer prescribed, but optionally possible.

For the procession, during which the Most Holy is carried from the repositioning altar to the high altar, the hymn Vexilla regis was no longer sung, but there were initially three short antiphons. In the further development from 1969, silence prevailed for the transmission.

Holy Communion in the form of the hosts consecrated on Maundy Thursday is also administered to the faithful. The old rites of the Pre-sanctified Mass, before the Pius XII reforms, reminiscent of the Holy Mass, were replaced by a simplified communion celebration, for example, the elevation of the host and the archaic contact consecration of wine were abolished by the sinking of a fragment of the pre-sanctified host.

Another change concerned the liturgical garments and their color. Before the reform, the celebrant wore a black chasuble for almost the entire celebration, which he laid down alone for the veneration of the cross, he did not wear a liturgical outer garment after the reform in the first part of the celebration, but only an albe and a black stole. To the Great Intercessions, which were now, no longer prayed on the side of the Epistle, but in the middle of the altar, the main celebrant then put on a black choir coat and a violet chasuble for the communion celebration. The deacon and subdeacon wore Dalmatic and Tunicella (black for the interceration, violet for the communion celebration); the folded casels (black) and the stole were also abolished in the reformed Good Friday liturgy. Also new was that deacon and subdeacon no longer stood in a straight line behind the celebrant on the steps of the altar, but flanked the celebrants with the great intercessions.

=== Easter Vigil ===
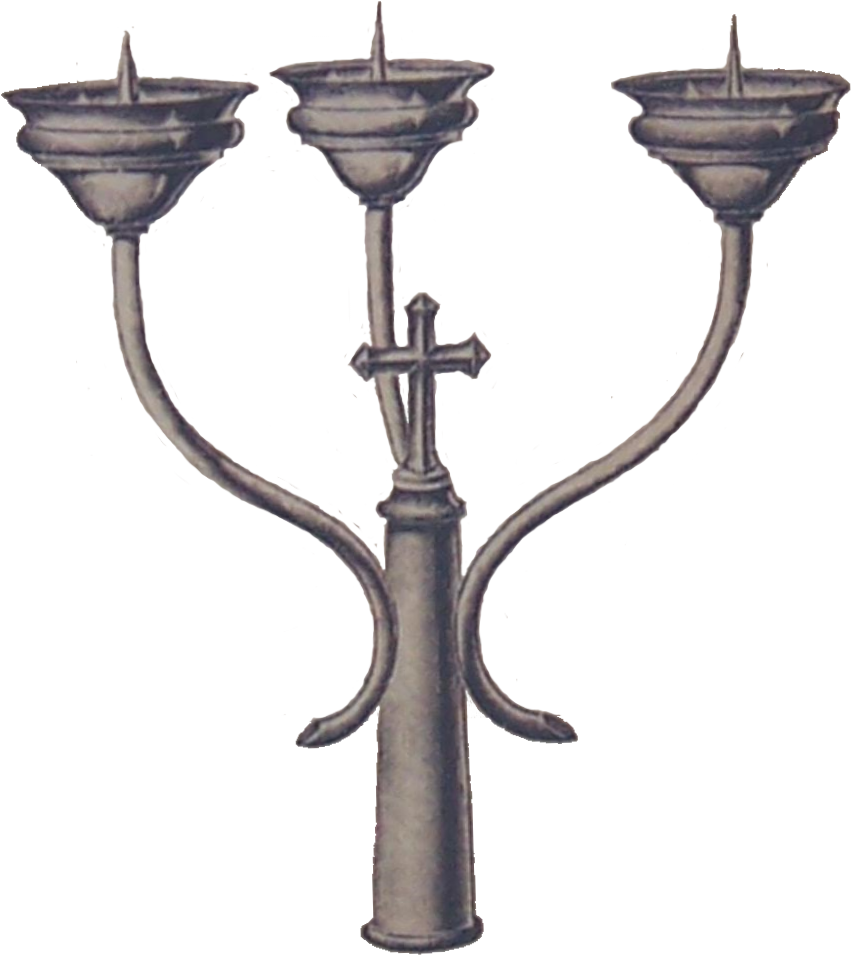
A triple candlestick that was in use until 1956

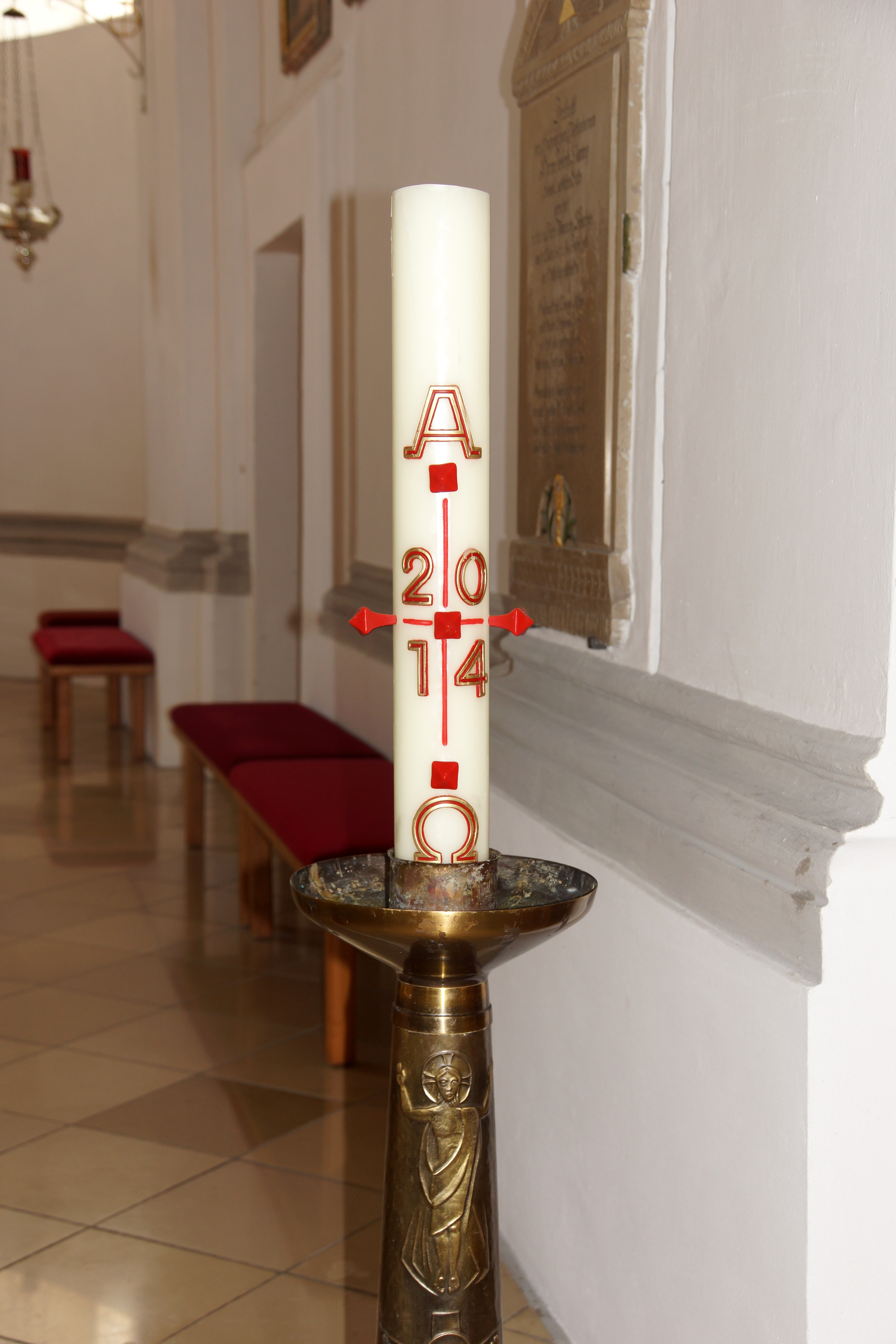
From 1956, the Paschal candle was lit outside the church rather than inside

| Before Pius XII reforms | After Pius XII reforms | From 1969 |
|---|---|---|
| At the blessing of the Easter Fire, the celebrant only consecrated this, and the five incense grains. The light was brought into the church by the deacon with a three-armed candlestick (triangel chandelier), which, according to one of many later interpretations, symbolized the Trinity. The candlestick was carried in front of the cross. The Easter candle was only prepared by the deacon during the Exsultet preface. Before the words in huius igitur noctis gratia, suscipe, sancte Pater, incensi hujus sacrificium vespertinum ("In the grace of this night, accept, holy Father, the evening sacrifice of this incense"), he inserted the incense grains into the candle. Before the words Qui licet sit divisus in partes, mutatio tamen luminis detrimenta non-novit ("Although it is divided, it knows no weakening of the light") the Easter candle was lit, a little later also all the lights in the church (but not yet the altar candles). | The Easter candle is prepared and consecrated at the Easter bonfire in front of the church. In addition to the incense grains, a cross, the Greek letters Alpha and Omega and the year are engraved in the Easter candle.The lit paschal candle, is carried before the procession in the church, possibly the Thurifier goes before the Easter candle. | Same as 1956, except these prayers are said in vernacular instead of Latin. |
| At three pauses during the procession, one of the three candles of the triple candlestick, with the call Lumen Christi – Deo gratias was lit. All genuflect. Inside the church, the triple candlestick had its place at the steps of the altar, the Easter candle stood next to it and was only lit towards the end of the Exsultet. | Three stops on the way with the same exclamation, all genuflect towards the lit Easter candle; all carry candles, at the first pause the priest lights his candle on the Easter candle, at the second, the light is passed on to all liturgical services, at the third to all worship participants. The Easter candle is placed in the middle of the choir room. | At the second pause, everyone lights their candles with the fire from the Paschal candle. |
| Twelve readings from the Old Testament. For this purpose, the celebrating priest changed from cope to chasuble and maniple (all in violet), and the deacon also switched from white to violet. | Four readings from the Old Testament with Canticum, genuflect to the Flectamus genua – Levate and Oration. The Celebrant also wore the violet cope during this part of Easter Vigil | Seven readings from the Old Testament (for pastoral reasons they could be limited to two or three), then each Psalm with antiphon and Prayer or Silence. |
| The celebrating priest laid the chausible again and wore the cope for the next part of the celebration.Procession with cross and burning Easter candle during the song of the TractusSicut cervus desiderat ad fontes aquarum ("As the deer craves for fresh water", Ps 42,2 EU) to the baptismal chapel, there baptismal water consecration. The Easter candle was lowered into the water three times. Part of the water was separated for the use of the faithful as Easter water, holy oils were added to the water remaining in the baptismal font. The faithful were sprinkled with Easter water, the shrines were filled. If necessary, baptism of adults were also done at this time. On this occasion, the liturgical color is changed again, the celebrant wears a white choir coat for baptism. Afterwards, the violet garments were put on again and the All Saints' Day Litany was sung, in which each invocation and its answer was repeated. | The baptismal consecration does not take place at its traditional liturgical place, but in the choir. Another innovation is the division of the Litany of the Saints into two; at the beginning of the baptismal consecration the first part of it is sung, each invocation and answer only once. Now, if necessary, baptisms follow, then the baptismal water is carried in procession to the holy water fonts. As a new rite follows the renewal of the baptismal promise, in which all burning candles hold in their hands. Those present are sprinkled with Paschal water, followed by the second part of the Litany of the Saints. | Baptismal consecration and baptisms take place in the Holy Mass after the Gospel and Homily, depending on local conditions – at the baptismal fountain or in the altar room. It begins with the Litany of the Saints, which is sung again in a piece, although not at the traditional time. The consecration of the baptismal water eliminates the traditional preface and the addition of the holy oils. If no baptismal water is consecrated, Easter water is blessed. Now follows the renewal of the baptismal promise and spraying, to which all bear burning candles. The creed is omitted. |
| High office without Introit, Offertory, Creed, Agnus Dei, Peace Kiss and Communion. After the Communion, the shortened Vespers were sung. | High office without prayers at foot of altar, introit, creed, offertory, Agnus Dei and peace kiss. After the Communion, the shortened lauds are sung. | After the last reading from the Old Testament, the altar candles are lit, the Holy Mass begins with the solemn Gloria. After the consecration of baptismal water and baptism of adults, the Eucharistic celebration continues with the intercessions. The laudes after the Holy Mass were omitted. |

== Other ==
As the Liturgical Movement had long been exploring the history and form of concelebrating Mass, in 1956, Pius specified that all celebrants say the words of consecration aloud if they mean to participate fully, not just externally.

== See also ==
- Catholic liturgy
- General Roman Calendar of Pope Pius XII
- Eastern canonical reforms of Pius XII
- Latin Psalters#Versio Piana
- Reform of the Roman Breviary by Pope Pius X
- Liturgical reforms of Pope Paul VI
