= Mass stipend =

Gift to a priest for praying a Mass

In the Catholic Church, a Mass stipend is a donation given by the laity to a priest for celebrating a Mass for a particular intention. Despite the name, it is considered as a gift or offering (Latin: stips) freely given rather than a payment (Latin: stipendium) as such.

This is usually a small amount of money determined at the discretion of the family, community or individual in question, and may vary depending on the occasion and number of attendees. As it is considered simony for priests to request payment for a sacrament, the donors decide upon the form and amount of stipend, and are received as gifts. Typically, the diocese sets a minimum donation for Mass stipends, and donors are asked to cover this amount for expenses.

Code of Canon Law, canon 945 states that

In accordance with the approved custom of the Church, any priest who celebrates or concelebrates a Mass may accept an offering to apply the Mass for a specific intention.

The donation of a stipend for the celebration of a Mass dates back to the eighth century.

== Mass cards ==
A Mass card is a card which indicates that a person, whether living or deceased, will be included in the intentions at a specific Catholic Mass or set of Masses. After donation of the Mass stipend, the card is presented to the person or, if deceased, their family. Mass cards are a relatively recent custom, with the term's first recorded use in 1930.

The large number of requests for Mass cards sometimes poses a dilemma, since an individual Mass is supposed to be celebrated for each card signed according to canon law. In a practice generally considered illicit, Mass cards are sometimes sold with a printed signature, without being linked to a specific priest or Mass being celebrated.

In Ireland, a section of the Charities Act 2009 made it illegal to sell Mass cards without an arrangement with a Catholic bishop or provincial, with conviction leading to a jail sentence of 10 years or a fine of up to €300,000. The law was upheld in a constitutional challenge in 2009, in a case where one of Ireland's largest commercial Mass card sellers had given €100 each month to a canonically suspended priest in the West Indies, who would say three Masses for about ten thousand people.

== See also ==
- Funeral dues
- Pittance
