= Exsultet =

Hymn of praise sung in the Christian liturgies of Easter

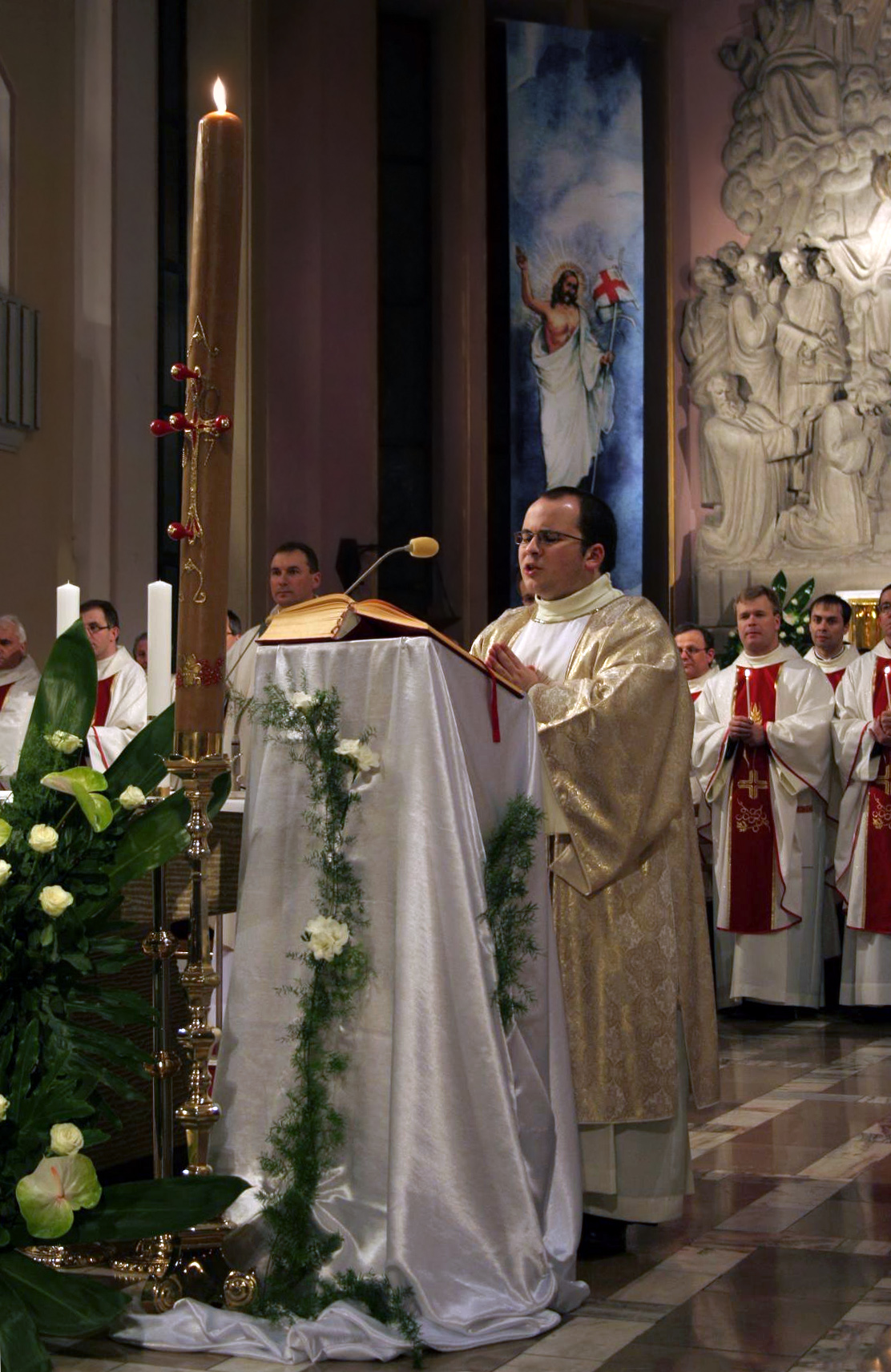
The Exsultet in a Polish church.

The Exsultet (spelled in pre-1920 editions of the Roman Missal as Exultet), also known as the Easter Proclamation (Latin: Praeconium Paschale), is a lengthy sung proclamation delivered before the paschal candle, ideally by a deacon, during the Easter Vigil in the Roman Rite of Mass. In the absence of a deacon, it may be sung by a priest or by a cantor. It is sung after a procession with the paschal candle before the beginning of the Liturgy of the Word. It is also used in Anglican and various Lutheran churches, as well as other Western Christian denominations.

== History ==
Since the 1955 revision of the Holy Week rites, the Roman Missal explicitly gives the title Praeconium (proclamation or praise) to the Exsultet, as it already did implicitly in the formula it provided for blessing the deacon before the chant: ut digne et competenter annunties suum Paschale praeconium. Outside Rome, use of the paschal candle appears to have been a very ancient tradition in Italy, Gaul, Spain and perhaps, from the reference by Augustine of Hippo (De Civ. Dei, XV, xxii), in Africa. The Liber Pontificalis attributes to Pope Zosimus its introduction in the local church in Rome.

The formula used for the Praeconium was not always the Exsultet, though it is perhaps true to say that this formula has survived, where other contemporary formulae have disappeared. In the Liber Ordinum, for instance, the formula is of the nature of a benediction, and the Gelasian Sacramentary has the prayer Deus mundi conditor, not found elsewhere, but containing the remarkable "praise of the bee"—possibly a Vergilian reminiscence—which is found with more or less modification in all the texts of the Praeconium down to the present.

The regularity of the metrical cursus of the Exsultet would lead us to place the date of its composition perhaps as early as the fifth century, and not later than the seventh. The earliest manuscripts in which it appears are those of the three Gallican Sacramentaries: the Bobbio Missal (7th century), the Missale Gothicum and the Missale Gallicanum Vetus (both of the 8th century). The earliest manuscript of the Gregorian Sacramentary (Vat. Reg. 337) does not contain the Exsultet, but it was added in the supplement to what has been loosely called the Sacramentary of Adrian, and probably drawn up under the direction of Alcuin.

As it stands in the liturgy, it may be compared with two other forms, the blessing of palms on Palm Sunday, and the blessing of the baptismal font at the Easter Vigil. The order is, briefly:

- An invitation to those present to join with the deacon in invoking the blessing of God, that the praises of the candle may be worthily celebrated. This invitation, wanting in the two blessings just mentioned, may be likened to an amplified Orate fratres, and its antiquity is attested by its presence in the Ambrosian Rite, which otherwise differs from the Roman. This section closes with the per omnia saecula saeculorum, leading into . . .
- Dominus vobiscum etc., Sursum corda etc., Gratias agamus etc. This section serves as the introduction to the body of the Praeconium, cast in the Eucharistic form to emphasize its solemnity.
- The Praeconium proper, which is of the nature of a Preface, or, as it is called in the Missale Gallicanum Vetus, a contestatio. First, a parallel is drawn between the Passover of the Old and the New Covenants, the candle corresponding to the Pillar of Fire. Here, the language of the liturgy rises to heights which are hard to find a parallel in Christian literature. Through the outlines of ancient dogmas as through a portal, we are drawn into the warmth of the deepest mysticism, to the region where, in the light of paradise, even the sin of Adam may be regarded as truly necessary and a happy fault. Secondly, the candle itself is offered as a burnt-sacrifice, a type of Christ, marked by grains of incense as with the five glorious Wounds of his Passion.

In pre-1970 forms of the Roman Rite the deacon or, if there is no deacon, the priest himself, removes his violet vestments and wears a white or gold dalmatic for the entry into the church with the paschal candle and the singing or recitation of the Exsultet, resuming the violet vestments immediately afterwards. In the later form, white vestments are worn throughout. The affixing, in the pre-1955 form of the Roman Rite, of five grains of incense at the words incensi hujus sacrificium was removed in Pope Pius XII's revision.

The chant is usually an elaborate form of the well-known recitative of the Preface. In some uses, a long bravura was introduced upon the word accendit, to fill in the pause, which must otherwise occur while, in the pre-1955 form of the rite, the deacon is lighting the candle. In Italy, the Praeconium was sung from long strips of parchment, gradually unrolled as the deacon proceeded. These "Exsultet rolls" were decorated with illuminations as visual aids and with the portraits of contemporary reigning sovereigns, whose names were mentioned in the course of the Praeconium. The use of these rolls, as far as is known at present, was confined to Italy. The best examples date from the tenth and eleventh centuries.

The beginning of the Exsultet in the Liber Usualis

== Roman Catholic English and Latin text ==
English text
Exult, let them exult, the hosts of heaven,
exult, let Angel ministers of God exult,
let the trumpet of salvation
sound aloud our mighty King's triumph!

Be glad, let earth be glad, as glory floods her,
ablaze with light from her eternal King,
let all corners of the earth be glad,
knowing an end to gloom and darkness.

Rejoice, let Mother Church also rejoice,
arrayed with the lightning of his glory,
let this holy building shake with joy,
filled with the mighty voices of the peoples.

(Therefore, dearest friends,
standing in the awesome glory of this holy light,
invoke with me, I ask you,
the mercy of God almighty,
that he, who has been pleased to number me,
though unworthy, among the Levites,
may pour into me his light unshadowed,
that I may sing this candle's perfect praises).

(Deacon: The Lord be with you.
People: And with your spirit.)
Deacon: Lift up your hearts.
People: We lift them up to the Lord.
Deacon: Let us give thanks to the Lord our God.
People: It is right and just.

It is truly right and just,
with ardent love of mind and heart
and with devoted service of our voice,
to acclaim our God invisible, the almighty Father,
and Jesus Christ, our Lord, his Son, his Only Begotten.

Who for our sake paid Adam's debt to the eternal Father,
and, pouring out his own dear Blood,
wiped clean the record of our ancient sinfulness.

These, then, are the feasts of Passover,
in which is slain the Lamb, the one true Lamb,
whose Blood anoints the doorposts of believers.

This is the night,
when once you led our forebears, Israel's children,
from slavery in Egypt
and made them pass dry-shod through the Red Sea.

This is the night
that with a pillar of fire
banished the darkness of sin.

This is the night
that even now throughout the world,
sets Christian believers apart from worldly vices
and from the gloom of sin,
leading them to grace
and joining them to his holy ones.

This is the night
when Christ broke the prison-bars of death
and rose victorious from the underworld.

Our birth would have been no gain,
had we not been redeemed.
O wonder of your humble care for us!
O love, O charity beyond all telling,
to ransom a slave you gave away your Son!

O truly necessary sin of Adam,
destroyed completely by the Death of Christ!

O happy fault
that earned for us so great, so glorious a Redeemer!

O truly blessed night,
worthy alone to know the time and hour
when Christ rose from the underworld!

This is the night
of which it is written:
The night shall be as bright as day,
dazzling is the night for me, and full of gladness.

The sanctifying power of this night
dispels wickedness, washes faults away,
restores innocence to the fallen, and joy to mourners,
drives out hatred, fosters concord, and brings down the mighty.

On this, your night of grace, O holy Father,
accept this candle, a solemn offering,
the work of bees and of your servants' hands,
an evening sacrifice of praise,
this gift from your most holy Church.

But now we know the praises of this pillar,
which glowing fire ignites for God's honour,
a fire into many flames divided,
yet never dimmed by sharing of its light,
for it is fed by melting wax,
drawn out by mother bees
to build a torch so precious.

O truly blessed night,
when things of heaven are wed to those of earth,
and divine to the human.

Therefore, O Lord,
we pray you that this candle,
hallowed to the honour of your name,
may persevere undimmed,
to overcome the darkness of this night.
Receive it as a pleasing fragrance,
and let it mingle with the lights of heaven.
May this flame be found still burning
by the Morning Star:
the one Morning Star who never sets,
Christ your Son,
who, coming back from death's domain,
has shed his peaceful light on humanity,
and lives and reigns for ever and ever.
Amen.

Latin text
Exsúltet iam angélica turba cælórum:
exsúltent divína mystéria:
et pro tanti Regis victória tuba ínsonet salutáris.

Gáudeat et tellus, tantis irradiáta fulgóribus:
et ætérni Regis splendóre illustráta,
totíus orbis se séntiat amisísse calíginem.

Lætétur et mater Ecclésia,
tanti lúminis adornáta fulgóribus:
et magnis populórum vócibus hæc aula resúltet.

[Quaprópter astántes vos, fratres caríssimi,
ad tam miram huius sancti lúminis claritátem,
una mecum, quæso,
Dei omnipoténtis misericórdiam invocáte.
Ut, qui me non meis méritis
intra Levitárum númerum dignátus est aggregáre,
lúminis sui claritátem infúndens,
cérei huius laudem implére perfíciat.]

[℣. Dóminus vobíscum.
℟. Et cum spíritu tuo.]
℣. Sursum corda.
℟. Habémus ad Dóminum.
℣. Grátias agámus Dómino Deo nostro.
℟. ℟. Dignum et iustum est.

Vere dignum et iustum est,
invisíbilem Deum Patrem omnipoténtem
Filiúmque eius unigénitum,
Dóminum nostrum Iesum Christum,
toto cordis ac mentis afféctu et vocis ministério personáre.

Qui pro nobis ætérno Patri Adæ débitum solvit,
et véteris piáculi cautiónem pio cruóre detérsit.

Hæc sunt enim festa paschália,
in quibus verus ille Agnus occíditur,
cuius sánguine postes fidélium consecrántur.

Hæc nox est,
in qua primum patres nostros, fílios Israel
edúctos de Ægypto,
Mare Rubrum sicco vestígio transíre fecísti.

Hæc ígitur nox est,
quæ peccatórum ténebras colúmnæ illuminatióne purgávit.

Hæc nox est,
quæ hódie per univérsum mundum in Christo credéntes,
a vítiis sæculi et calígine peccatórum segregátos,
reddit grátiæ, sóciat sanctitáti.

Hæc nox est,
in qua, destrúctis vínculis mortis,
Christus ab ínferis victor ascéndit.

Nihil enim nobis nasci prófuit,
nisi rédimi profuísset.
O mira circa nos tuæ pietátis dignátio!
O inæstimábilis diléctio caritátis:
ut servum redímeres, Fílium tradidísti!

O certe necessárium Adæ peccátum,
quod Christi morte delétum est!

O felix culpa,
quæ talem ac tantum méruit habére Redemptórem!

O vere beáta nox,
quæ sola méruit scire tempus et horam,
in qua Christus ab ínferis resurréxit!

Hæc nox est, de qua scriptum est:
Et nox sicut dies illuminábitur:
et nox illuminátio mea in delíciis meis.

Huius ígitur sanctificátio noctis fugat scélera, culpas lavat:
et reddit innocéntiam lapsis et mæstis lætítiam.
Fugat ódia, concórdiam parat et curvat impéria.

In huius ígitur noctis grátia, súscipe, sancte Pater,
laudis huius sacrifícium vespertínum,
quod tibi in hac cérei oblatióne solémni,
per ministrórum manus
de opéribus apum, sacrosáncta reddit Ecclésia.

Sed iam colúmnæ huius præcónia nóvimus,
quam in honórem Dei rútilans ignis accéndit.
Qui, lícet sit divísus in partes,
mutuáti tamen lúminis detrimenta non novit.

Alitur enim liquántibus ceris,
quas in substántiam pretiósæ huius lámpadis
apis mater edúxit.

O vere beáta nox,
in qua terrénis cæléstia, humánis divína iungúntur!

Orámus ergo te, Dómine,
ut céreus iste in honórem tui nóminis consecrátus,
ad noctis huius calíginem destruéndam,
indefíciens persevéret.
Et in odórem suavitátis accéptus,
supérnis lumináribus misceátur.

Flammas eius lúcifer matutínus invéniat:
ille, inquam, lúcifer, qui nescit occásum.
Christus Fílius tuus,
qui, regréssus ab ínferis, humáno géneri serénus illúxit,
et tecum vivit et regnat in sæcula sæculórum.

℟. Amen.

=== Prayer for the Emperor ===
Until 1955, the Exsultet ended with a long prayer for the Holy Roman Emperor:

Respice etiam ad devotissimum Imperatorem nostrum (*electum Imperatorem) [Nomen] cujus tu, Deus, desiderii vota praenoscens, ineffabili pietatis et misericordiae tuae munere, tranquillum perpetuae pacis accommoda, et coelestem victoriam cum omni populo suo.
Look also upon our most devout Emperor [Name], the desires of whose longing you, O God, know beforehand, and by the inexpressible grace of your kindness and mercy grant him the tranquillity of lasting peace and heavenly victory with all his people.

Only the head of the Holy Roman Empire could be prayed for with this formula, and with the resignation in 1806 of the last emperor, Francis II of Austria, the prayer was in practice not used. The prayer now ended with the immediately preceding petition, for the members of the Church:

Precamur ergo te, Domine: ut nos famulos tuos, omnemque clerum, et devotissimum populum: una cum beatissimo Papa nostro N. et Antistite nostro N. quiete temporum assidua protectione regere, gubernare, et conservare digneris.

After Pope Pius IX's Imperii Galliarum of 10 September 1857, Emperor Napoleon III of France would be prayed for from 1858 to 1870 by adding “necnon gloriosissimo Imperatore nostro N.” to this ending, which became:

Precamur ergo te, Domine: ut nos famulos tuos, omnemque clerum, et devotissimum populum: una cum beatissimo Papa nostro N. et Antistite nostro N. necnon gloriosissimo Imperatore nostro N. quiete temporum assidua protectione regere, gubernare, et conservare digneris.

In his 1955 reforms, Pope Pius XII added a phrase to the prayer for the members of the Church, and definitively replaced the prayer for the Holy Roman Emperor with a generic prayer for civil authorities inspired by it:

Precamur ergo te, Domine: ut nos famulos tuos, omnemque clerum, et devotissimum populum: una cum beatissimo Papa nostro N. et Antistite nostro N. quiete temporum concessa, in his paschalibus gaudiis, assidua protectione regere, gubernare, et conservare digneris. Respice etiam ad eos, qui nos in potestate regunt, et, ineffabili pietatis et misericordiae tuae munere, dirige cogitationes eorum ad iustitiam et pacem, ut de terrena operositate ad caelestem patriam perveniant cum omni populo tuo.

This was removed in the Mass of Paul VI in 1970 issued following the Second Vatican Council, but remains in use in the Extraordinary Form of the Roman Rite.

All variants ended with the formula:

Per eundem Dominum Nostrum Iesum Christum filium tuum, qui tecum vivit et regnat in unitate Spiritus Sancti, Deus, per omnia saecula saeculorum.
℟. Amen.

== Anglican text ==
The following is an example of an Anglican text of the Exsultet, taken from the Book of Common Prayer of the Episcopal Church in the United States.

The paschal candle is placed in its stand. Then the deacon, or other person appointed, standing near the candle, sings or says the Exsultet as follows (the sections in brackets may be omitted):

Rejoice now, heavenly hosts and choirs of angels,
and let your trumpets shout Salvation
for the victory of our mighty King.

Rejoice and sing now, all the round earth,
bright with a glorious splendor,
for darkness has been vanquished by our eternal King.

Rejoice and be glad now, Mother Church,
and let your holy courts, in radiant light,
resound with the praises of your people.

(All you who stand near this marvelous and holy flame,
pray with me to God the Almighty
for the grace to sing the worthy praise of this great light;
through Jesus Christ his Son our Lord,
who lives and reigns with him,
in the unity of the Holy Spirit,
one God, for ever and ever. Amen.)

Deacon: The Lord be with you.
Answer: And also with you.
Deacon: Let us give thanks to the Lord our God.
Answer: It is right to give him thanks and praise.

Deacon: It is truly right and good, always and everywhere,
with our whole heart and mind and voice, to praise you, the invisible,
almighty, and eternal God, and your only-begotten Son,
Jesus Christ our Lord; for he is the true Paschal Lamb, who
at the feast of the Passover paid for us the debt of Adam's sin,
and by his blood delivered your faithful people.

This is the night, when you brought our fathers, the children
of Israel, out of bondage in Egypt, and led them through the
Red Sea on dry land.

This is the night, when all who believe in Christ are delivered
from the gloom of sin, and are restored to grace and holiness
of life.

This is the night, when Christ broke the bonds of death and hell,
and rose victorious from the grave.

(How wonderful and beyond our knowing, O God, is your
mercy and loving-kindness to us, that to redeem a slave, you
gave a Son.

How holy is this night, when wickedness is put to flight, and
sin is washed away. It restores innocence to the fallen, and joy
to those who mourn. It casts out pride and hatred, and brings
peace and concord.

How blessed is this night, when earth and heaven are joined
and man is reconciled to God.)

Holy Father, accept our evening sacrifice, the offering of this
candle in your honor. May it shine continually to drive away
all darkness. May Christ, the Morning Star who knows no
setting, find it ever burning—he who gives his light to all
creation, and who lives and reigns for ever and ever. Amen.

It is customary that the Paschal candle burn at all services from Easter Day through the Day of Pentecost.

== Lutheran text ==
The following is an example form of the Lutheran Exsultet, taken from the Lutheran Service Book. This version, or a similar translation, may be used in various Lutheran denominations.

[After the candle bearer places the paschal candle in its stand, the cantor, deacon, or assisting minister turns to face the people and chants the Exsultet.]

Rejoice now, all you heavenly choirs of angels;
Rejoice now, all creation;
Sound forth, trumpet of salvation,
And proclaim the triumph of our King.
Rejoice too, all the earth,
In the radiance of the light now poured upon you
And made brilliant by the brightness of the everlasting King;
Know that the ancient darkness has been forever banished.
Rejoice, O Church of Christ,
Clothed in the brightness of this light;
Let all this house of God ring out with rejoicing,
With the praises of all God's faithful people.

[The following exchange between the presiding pastor and the congregation takes place.]

The Lord be with you.
And with your spirit.
Lift up your hearts.
We lift them up to the Lord.
Let us give thanks to the Lord, our God.
It is right and just.

[The presiding pastor then chants or speaks the conclusion of the Exsultet.]

It is truly good, right, and salutary
That we should at all times and in all places,
With all our heart and mind and voice,
Praise You, O Lord, Holy Father, almighty everlasting God,
And your only begotten Son,
Jesus Christ.
For He is the very Paschal Lamb
Who offered Himself for the sin of the world,
Who has cleansed us by the shedding of His precious blood.

This is the night
When You brought our fathers, the children of Israel,
Out of bondage in Egypt
And led them through the Red Sea on dry ground.

This is the night
When all who believe in Christ
Are delivered from bondage to sin
And are restored to life and immortality.

This is the night
When Christ, the Life, rose from the dead.

The seal of the grave is broken
And the morning of a new creation breaks forth out of night.
How wonderful and beyond all telling is Your mercy toward us, O God,
That to redeem a slave You gave Your Son.

How holy is this night
When all wickedness is put to flight
And sin is washed away.

How holy is this night
When innocence is restored to the fallen
And joy is given to those downcast.

How blessed is this night
When man is reconciled to God in Christ.

Holy Father,
Accept now the evening sacrifices of our thanksgiving and praise.
Let Christ, the true light and morning star, shine in our hearts,
He who gives light to all creation,
Who lives and reigns with You and the Holy Spirit,
One God, now and forever.
Amen.

The version authorized by the Evangelical Lutheran Church in America and published in Evangelical Lutheran Worship (2006) retains the wording about the candle and the bees:

Therefore, in this night of grace,
receive, O God, our praise and thanksgiving
for the light of the resurrection of our Lord Jesus Christ,
reflected in the burning of this candle.
We sing the glories of this pillar of fire,
the brightness of which is not diminished
even when its light is divided and borrowed.
for it is fed by the melting wax which the bees, your servants,
have made for the substance of this candle.

== Methodist text ==
The text of the Easter Proclamation contained in The United Methodist Book of Worship is chanted by a deacon after the procession into the church with the Paschal Candle:

Rejoice, heavenly powers! Sing, choirs of angels!
Exult, all creation around God's throne!
Jesus Christ, our King, is risen!
Sound the trumpet of salvation!

Rejoice, O earth, in shining splendor,
radiant in the brightness of our King!
Christ has conquered! Glory fills you!
Darkness vanishes for ever!

Rejoice, O holy Church! Exult in glory!
The risen Saviour shines upon you!
Let this place resound with joy,
echoing the mighty song of all God's people!

It is truly right that we should praise you,
invisible, almighty, and eternal God, and your Son, Jesus Christ.
For Christ has ransomed us with his blood,
and paid the debt of Adam's sin to deliver your faithful people.

This is our Passover feast, when Christ, the true Lamb, is slain.
This is the night when first you saved our forebears,
you freed the people of Israel from their slavery
and led them with dry feet through the sea.

This is the night when the pillar of fire destroyed the darkness of sin!
This is the night when Christians everywhere,
washed clean of sin and freed from all defilement,
are restored to grace and grow together in holiness.

This is the night when Jesus Christ broke the chains of death
and rose triumphant from the grave.
Night truly blessed, when heaven is wedded to earth,
and we are reconciled to you!

Accept this Easter candle, a flame divided but undimmed,
a pillar of fire that glows to your honor.
Let it mingle with the lights of heaven,
and continue bravely burning to dispel the darkness of the night!

May the Morning Star, which never sets, find this flame still burning.
Christ, that Morning Star, who came back from the dead,
and shed his peaceful light on all creation,
your Son who lives and reigns for ever and ever. Amen.
