= Salubong =

Filipino ritual

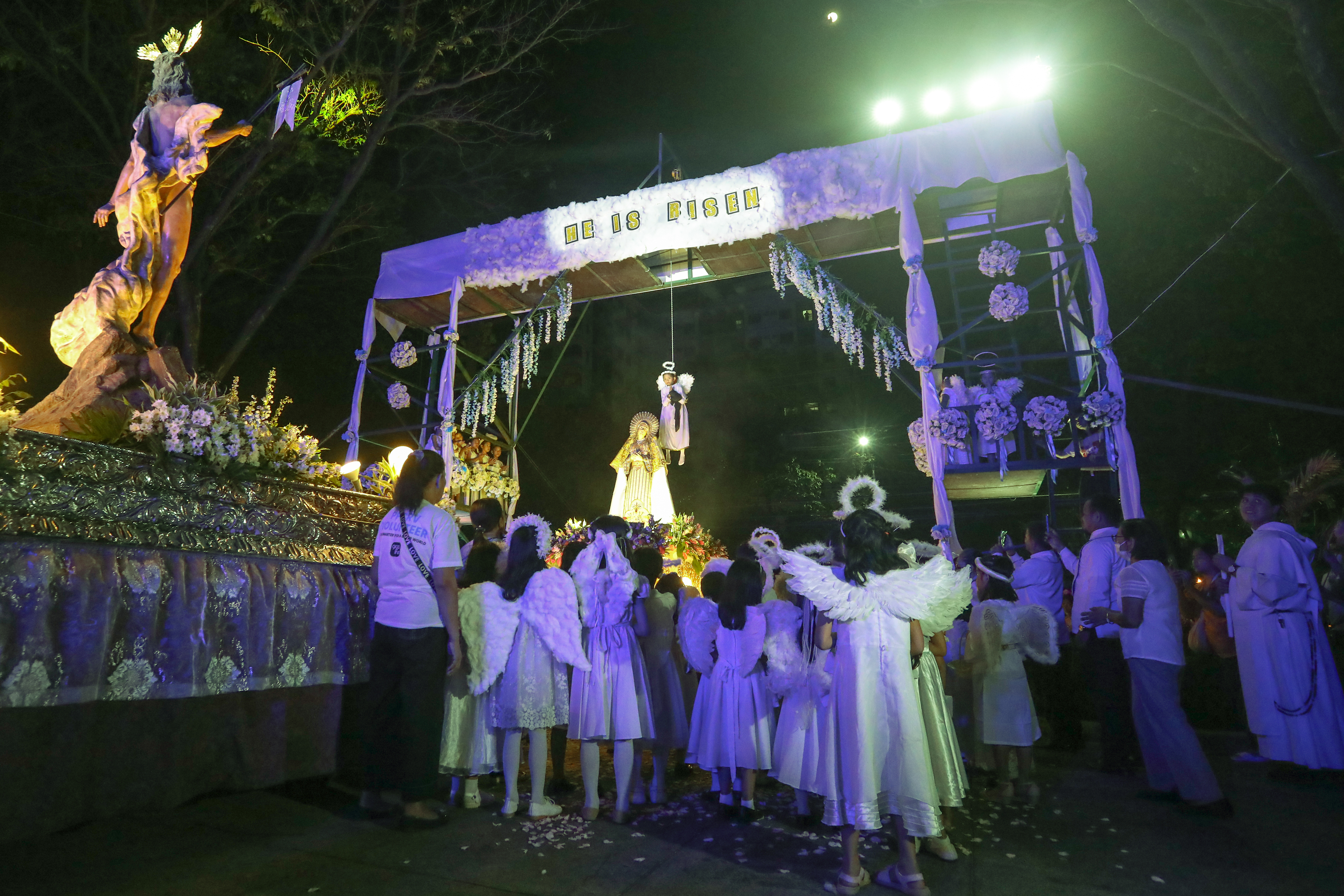
- Salubong rite on Easter Sunday at Santo Domingo Church in Quezon City
- Also called: Encuentro in Spanish; Sugat in Cebuano
- Observed by: Filipino Catholics
- Liturgical color: White or gold
- Type: Christianity
- First time: Between the 16th and 18th centuries
- Related to: Easter Sunday; Holy Week in the Philippines

Salubong (Tagalog: [saˈluboŋ]; Filipino for "meeting" or "encounter") is a traditional pre-dawn Easter ritual practiced in the Philippines that reenacts the encounter between the Risen Christ and the Virgin Mary. It is observed in Catholic communities across the country and marks the culmination of Holy Week and the beginning of Easter Sunday celebrations. The ritual combines Catholic liturgical symbolism with local cultural and theatrical traditions.

== History ==
The origins of Salubong date to the Spanish colonial period, when Catholic missionaries introduced dramatized religious practices to teach the faith. The ritual was originally known as Encuentro, a Spanish term referring to a meeting or encounter. It was designed as a catechetical tool to depict the reunion of Christ and Virgin Mary, an event not directly mentioned in the Bible but widely believed in popular devotion.

Over time, the practice became part of religious Filipino culture. While it kept its Catholic meaning, the Salubong included local traditions such as music, dance, and community participation. The lifting of the Virgin Mary’s black veil is an important part of the ritual. It represents the end of her sorrow and the beginning of hope.

== Rituals ==
The Salubong typically takes place before sunrise on Easter Sunday, often beginning as early as 3:00 or 4:00 am. Two separate processions are organized: one carrying the image of the Risen Christ and another carrying the image of Virgin Mary, often veiled in black. Men and women walk separately during the parade. At the point of meeting, a child dressed as an angel descends while singing "Regina Caeli." Practices vary from one church to another, with each community incorporating its own customs. Some traditions, like the dropping of the veil, are associated with local beliefs and superstitions. However, the central theme of grace and happiness in Salubong remains the same across communities.

Additional ritual roles may include the tenyenta, who performs a dance of welcome called Bati while waving a flag bearing the word “Alleluia,” and the kapitana, who sings verses recounting Mary’s role in the life of Jesus. The ceremony may also feature music, flower petals, confetti, and other festive elements.

== Regional variations ==
While the basic structure of the Salubong is consistent across the Philippines, regional variations reflect local customs and levels of elaboration. In some communities, the ritual is relatively simple. But in others, it becomes a large-scale production with elaborate staging, lighting, and choreographed performances.

Saboy

In the city of Las Piñas, the Salubong is followed by the Saboy, also known as the Sayaw ng Saboy.

The performers include the Salubong Angel, depicted with wings and a large veil; the Hosanna Angels, dressed in white and carrying baskets of rose petals, who constitute the majority of the dancers; the Tres Marias (Three Marys), who also carry baskets; and the Kapitana and Tinyentera, with the former bearing a large banner and the latter carrying incense.

Young girls perform dances around the church and along the city streets, accompanied by a marching band playing celebratory music.

Bati-bati (Sayaw ng Pagbati)

In Parañaque, the Sayaw ng Pagbati is recognized as the city’s official cultural dance. Following the Easter Mass, devotees gather to watch the Bati-bati, a performance held near the images of the Risen Christ and the Virgin Mary at the conclusion of the Salubong procession. Girls dressed in colorful costumes with ribbons perform dances in front of St. Andrew Cathedral, continuing the presentation until noon while waving decorative wands.

In Angono, Rizal, the ritual includes the participation of a Kapitana and a Tenyenta, who perform a religious dance. The Tenyenta dances first, accompanied by the music of a Gavotte, a traditional French dance. This is followed by the Kapitana, who recites the Dicho, a customary poem addressed to the Virgin Mary that expresses deep faith and devotion.

Sugat

In Bohol, and in other Cebuano traditions, Salubong is called Sugat or Hugos. Other towns in Bohol that observe elaborate Salubong rituals include Baclayon, Loay, and Dimiao.

Metro Manila

Some cause-oriented theater groups have staged their own version of Salubong. In 1984, Salubong sa Maynila (Salubong in Manila) was staged by Peryante on top of a truck at a rally in Liwasang Bonifacio.

== See also ==
- Holy Week in the Philippines
- Pabasa (ritual)
