= Holy Week in the Philippines =

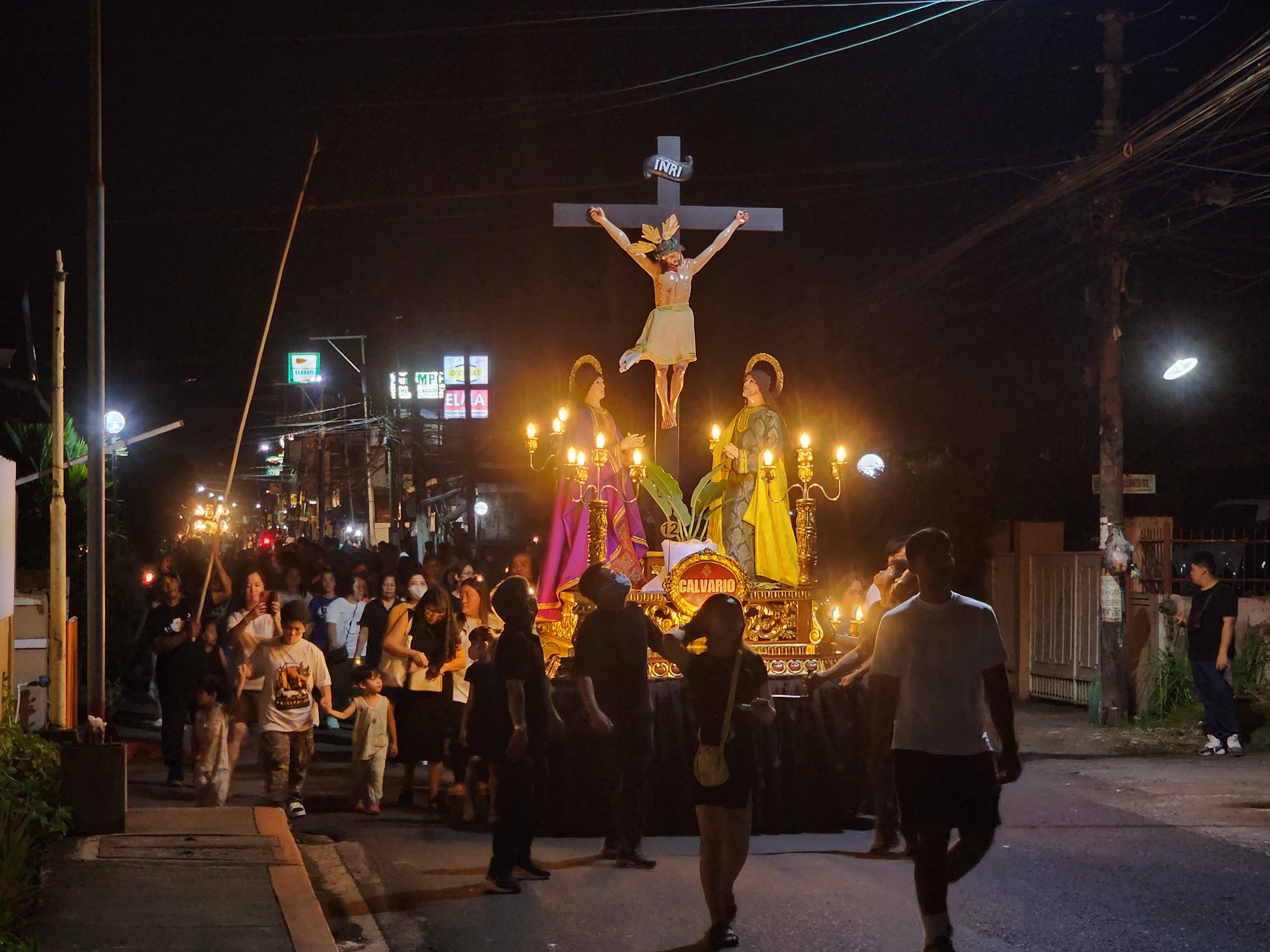
- A Good Friday procession in Ibaan, Batangas
- Also called: Semana Santa; Mahal na Araw
- Observed by: Philippines
- Type: Religious, historical, cultural
- Significance: Commemoration of the Passion, Death, and Resurrection of Jesus
- Observances: Processions, religious services
- Begins: Palm Sunday
- Ends: Easter Sunday
- Frequency: Annual

In the Philippines, Holy Week (Filipino: Mahal na Araw or Semana Santa) is a significant religious observance for the country's Catholic majority, the Philippine Independent Church (Iglesia Filipina Independiente), and most Protestant groups. The Philippines is one of the few majority-Christian countries in Asia, with Catholics comprising 78.8 percent of the national population in 2023, and the Catholic Church remaining a dominant sociopolitical force.

The solemn celebration of Holy Week begins on Friday of Sorrows (exactly one week before Good Friday), continues through Palm Sunday, and ends on Easter Sunday, lasting slightly over a week. Many communities observe Spanish-influenced Catholic rituals, such as processions, which have been syncretized with elements of precolonial beliefs. This is evident in some ritual practices not sanctioned by the Church, and in the many superstitions associated with the occasion.

The days of the Easter Triduum (Latin for “Three Days”), from Maundy Thursday to Black Saturday— known as Holy Thursday and Holy Saturday elsewhere—are national holidays. During this period, many businesses are closed or operate on shorter hours. It is also customary for domestic radio and television stations to go off the air, with some stations instead broadcasting appropriately themed programs, such as religious dramas, films, and live coverage of liturgies and Masses.

Holy Week in the Philippines is also one of the highly anticipated annual long weekends in the country. Non-Catholics and non-practicing Catholics often use this holiday for travel, resulting in a peak season in most Philippine tourist destinations.

== Palm Sunday ==
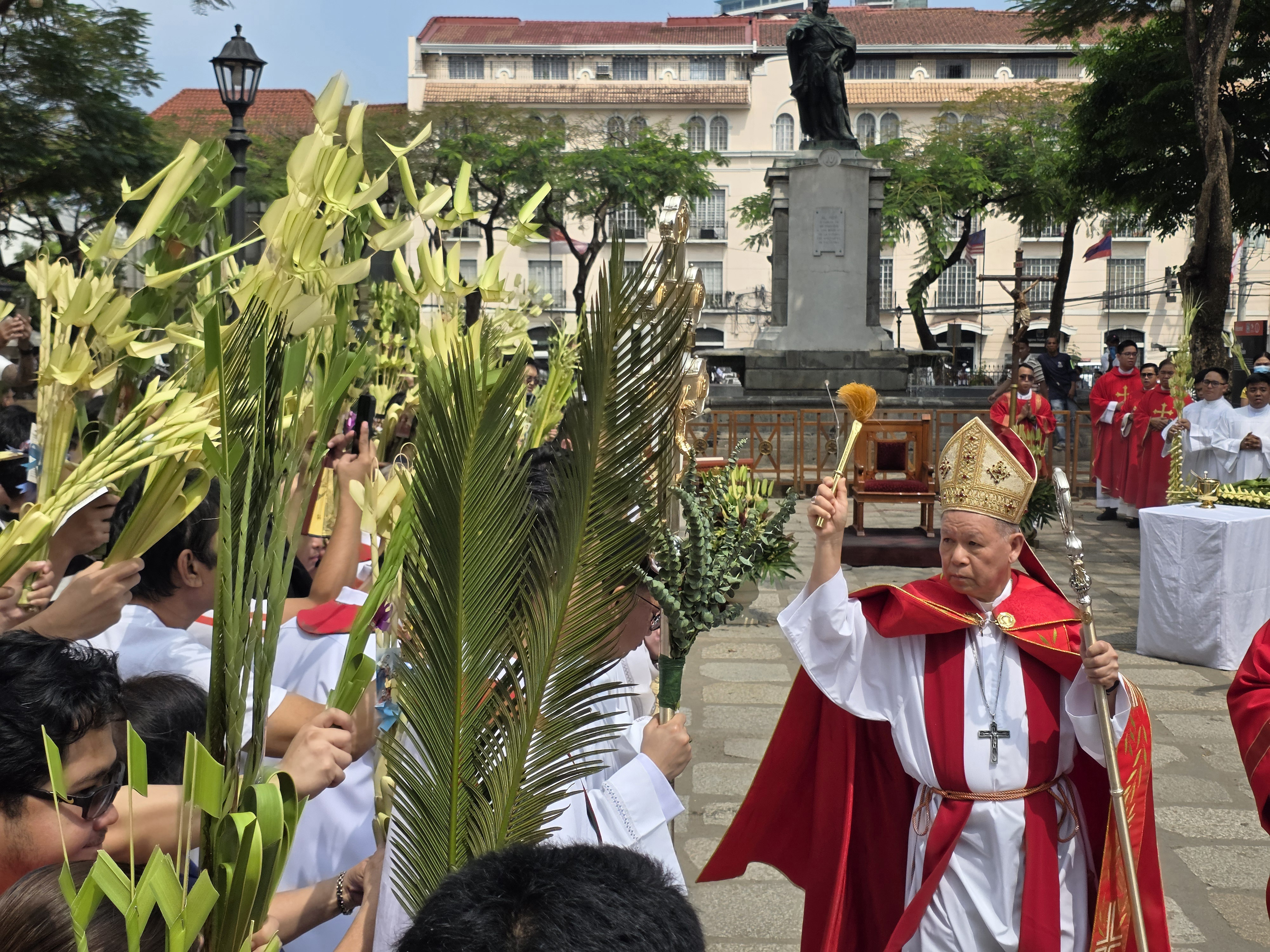
Cardinal Jose Advincula blesses palm fronds at Plaza de Roma fronting Manila Cathedral, 2026.

On Palm Sunday (Linggo ng Palaspás; Domingo de Ramos), worshipers bear ornately woven palm fronds (palaspás) to church for blessing by the priest before or after the day's Mass. The fronds (considered sacramentals by the Church) are often brought home and placed on altars, doors, lintels, or windows in the belief that these can ward off demons, fires, and lightning.

Some places hold a procession into the church before the service, a common starting point being an ermita/visita (chapel of ease) several blocks away. The presiding priest, vested in a stole and cope of red (the prescribed liturgical color of the day), either walks the route or, in imitation of Christ's triumphant entry into Jerusalem, is led on horseback to the church. Sometimes a statue of Christ riding a donkey (known as the Humenta) is used instead. Women customarily cover the processional route with tapis (a traditional wraparound cloth), designed as large heirloom skirts or aprons used only in this ritual. This recalls the Bible’s mention of excited Jerusalemites spreading their cloaks before Christ as he entered into the holy city.

Once the procession reaches the church or some other designated spot, children dressed as angels strew flowers and sing the day's processional antiphon Hosanna filio David ("Hosanna to the Son of David"), in the original Latin or translation to Philippine languages, and set to traditional hymn tunes.

The blessing of palms and the intonation of the antiphon often occur in the church parvise, church parking lot, or town plaza, which in the Philippines is commonly fronting or near the church.

== Holy Monday and Holy Tuesday ==
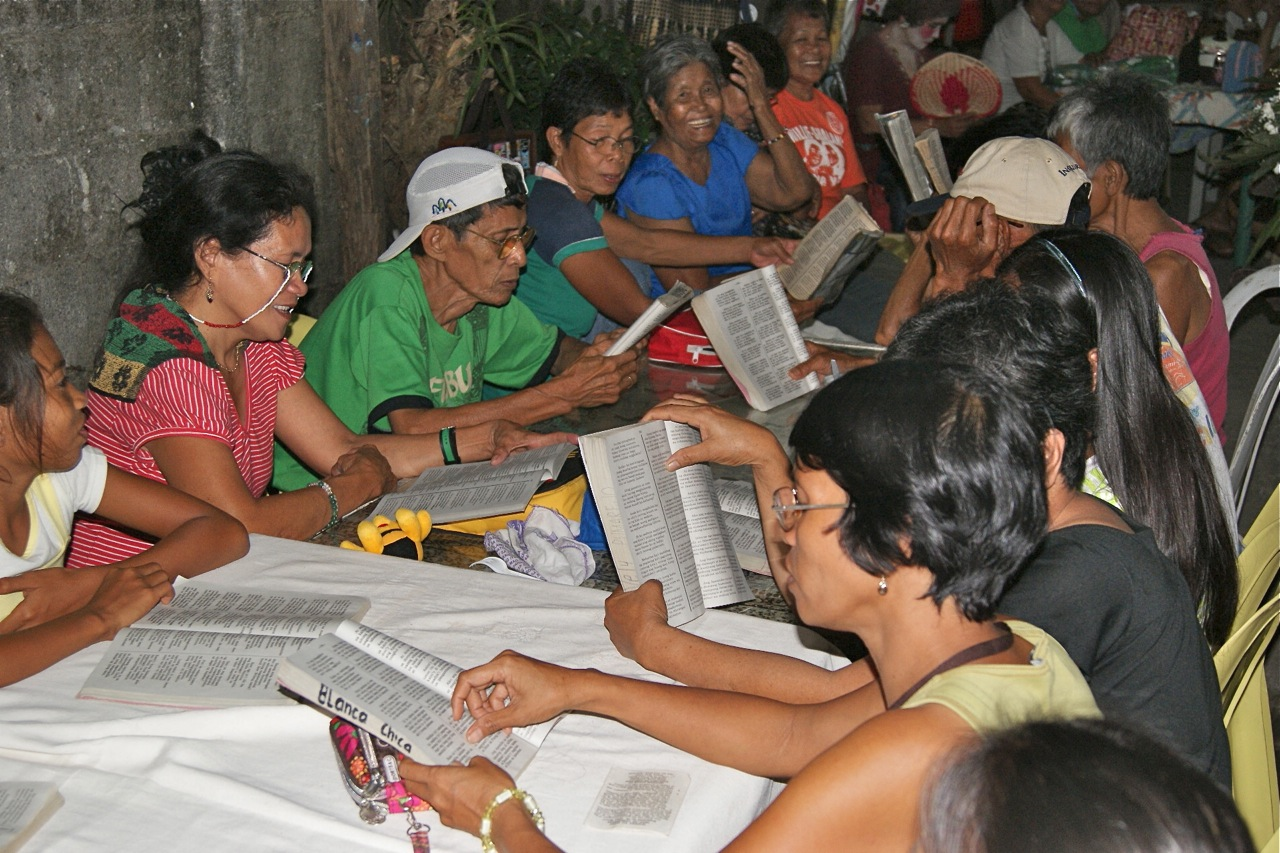
Pabasa ng Pasyon (Reading of the Passion of Christ) in Magdalena, Laguna (2011)

On Holy Monday (Lunes Santo) and Holy Tuesday (Martes Santo), there are processions representing the Journey to Calvary. The main figure is the Falling of Christ (the first, second and third times being part of the Stations of the Cross), accompanied by images of the saints present during his walk to Calvary:

- St. Peter, holding the heavenly keys
- St. John the Apostle
- The Three Marys:
  - Mary, mother of James, holding a bottle of oil or perfume;
  - Mary Magdalene, also holding oil or perfume but with longer, loose hair (as she is traditionally identified as the Repentant Woman who wiped Christ's feet);
  - Mary Salome, holding either a broom or thurible
- St. Veronica, holding her veil imprinted with Christ's image
- The Virgin of Sorrows, Christ's mother

In some parts of the country with abundant wood, skilled craftsmen construct life-size wooden images that can move their arms and heads like puppets.

Holy Tuesday is a regular working day and for some private companies, it is the last full workday of the week.

== Holy Wednesday ==
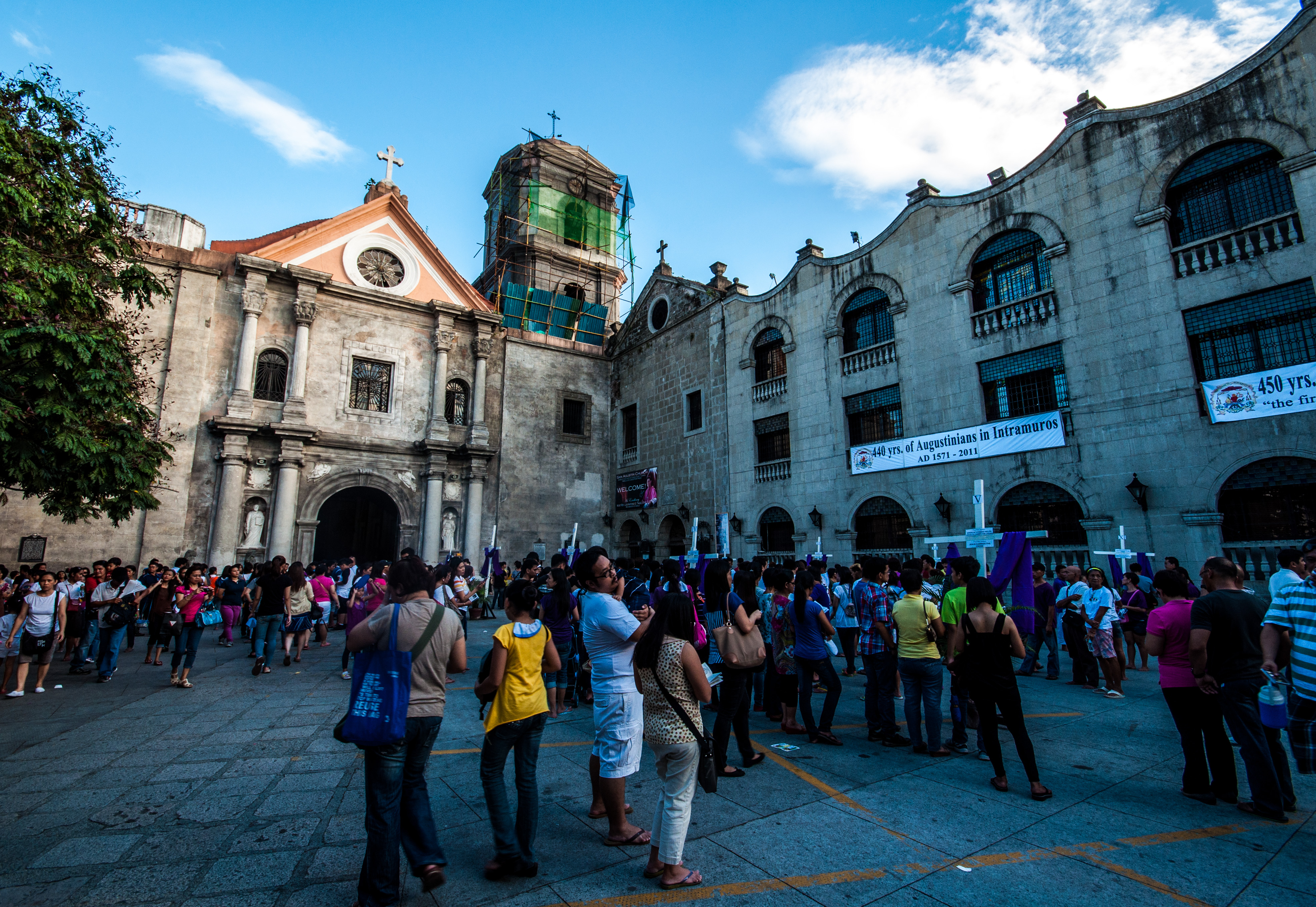
Stations of the Cross outside San Agustín Church in Intramuros, Manila on Holy Wednesday, 2013.

Holy Wednesday (Miyérkules Santo) is officially the last working day of the week. Private companies are free to give full or partial holidays to their employees, while government offices dismiss workers at noon. This allows those wishing to celebrate the Triduum to return to their home provinces, and holiday-makers to leave for their destinations. It is one of the country's busiest travel seasons.

In some cathedrals and parishes, the service of Tenebrae (Latin for “darkness” or “shadows”; also known locally as Tinieblas) is held on Holy Wednesday. The service contains scripture readings on the Passion of Jesus, chanted or read by clergy and others as servers gradually extinguish candles on a candelabrum known as a Tenebrae hearse. The Tinieblas ends with the strepitus, a loud noise representing the Crucifixion earthquake.

In the evening, long processions depicting the Passion of Christ are held in towns throughout the provinces of Pampanga, Bulacan, Rizal, Laguna, and Ilocandia, as well as in Makati, Metro Manila.

Except in Baliwag and Pulilan, both in Bulacan, the Passion tableaux are excluded from the Good Friday afternoon procession.

== Maundy Thursday ==
Maundy Thursday (Huwebes Santo) is the first statutory public holiday of the week, marking the beginning of the Paschal Triduum. The term "Maundy", used in Philippine civil legislation, is derived from the Latin mandatum in reference to Jesus' instruction to his apostles at the Last Supper: "A new commandment I give to you, that you love one another: just as I have loved you, you also are to love one another." (John 13:34)

Prior to the Second Vatican Council, the Procession of the Passion of Christ was held on Maundy Thursday. This celebration was transferred to Holy Wednesday for Latin Rite Catholics, while the Philippine Independent Church (which had separated from Rome in 1902) retained the Maundy Thursday date. Among the most famous processions of the Philippine Independent Church are those of Concepcion in Malabon, Metro Manila, and Santa Cruz and Paete in Laguna.

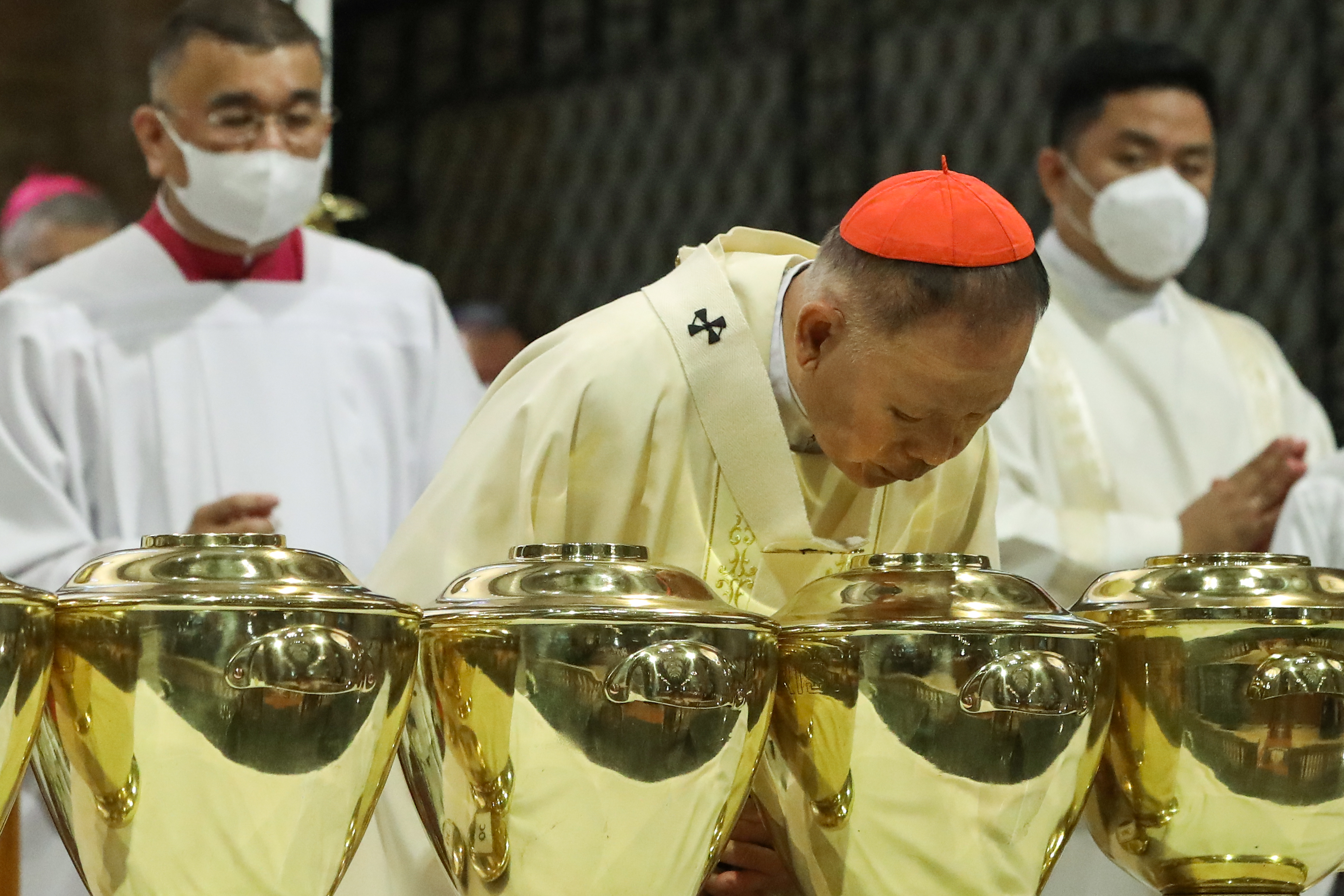
Chrism Mass at the Manila Cathedral in 2023. The Archbishop of Manila, Cardinal José Advíncula, is performing the insufflation over the sacred oil.

The first rite of the day is the Chrism Mass, in which parishioners join their priests for morning Mass in the cathedral, with the clergy renewing their priestly vows. This Mass, which is presided over by the local bishop or archbishop, is when the chrism (the oil of catechumens) and the oil for the sick are consecrated after the homily. After the liturgy, priests bring portions of these oils to their respective parishes and store them for future use, often in an aumbry. Where logistics and other valid reasons hamper gathering the clergy on this day, the Chrism Mass is instead held earlier in the week—for example, on Holy Tuesday in the Archdiocese of Lipa and the dioceses of Dumaguete and Malolos; and before Holy Week in the Archdiocese of Cebu, given its vast territory covering the entire province of the same name.

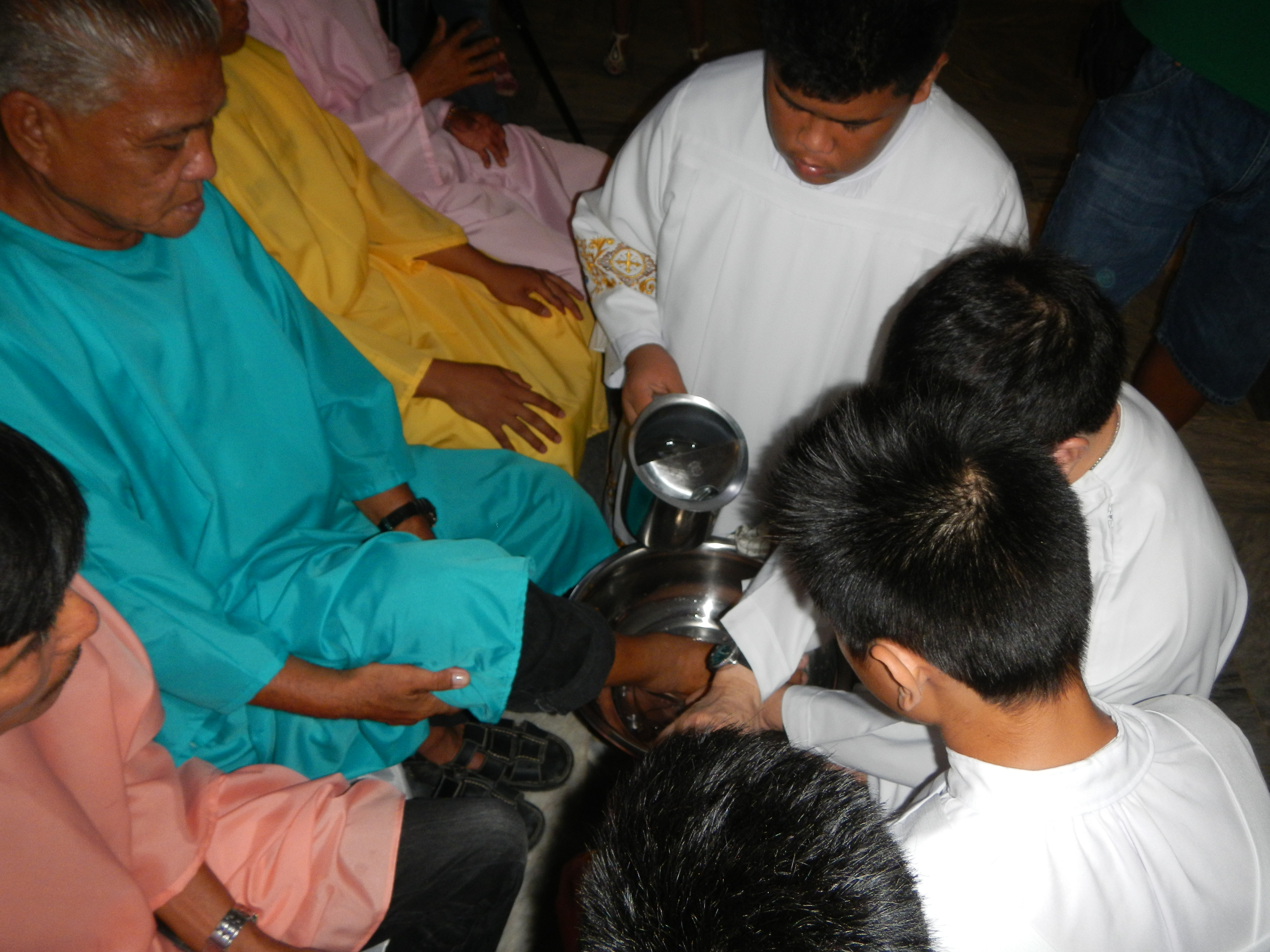
Washing of the Feet at Santa Monica Parish Church in Minalin, Pampanga

The day's main observance is the last Mass before Easter: the Evening Mass of the Lord's Supper. Though not mandatory, the afternoon service customarily includes a re-enactment of the Washing of the Feet of the Twelve Apostles. The service ends abruptly with a sombre procession of the Blessed Sacrament to the church's Altar of Repose. Churches remain open until midnight for those who want to venerate the Blessed Sacrament, or go to one of several priests on standby to confess their sins.

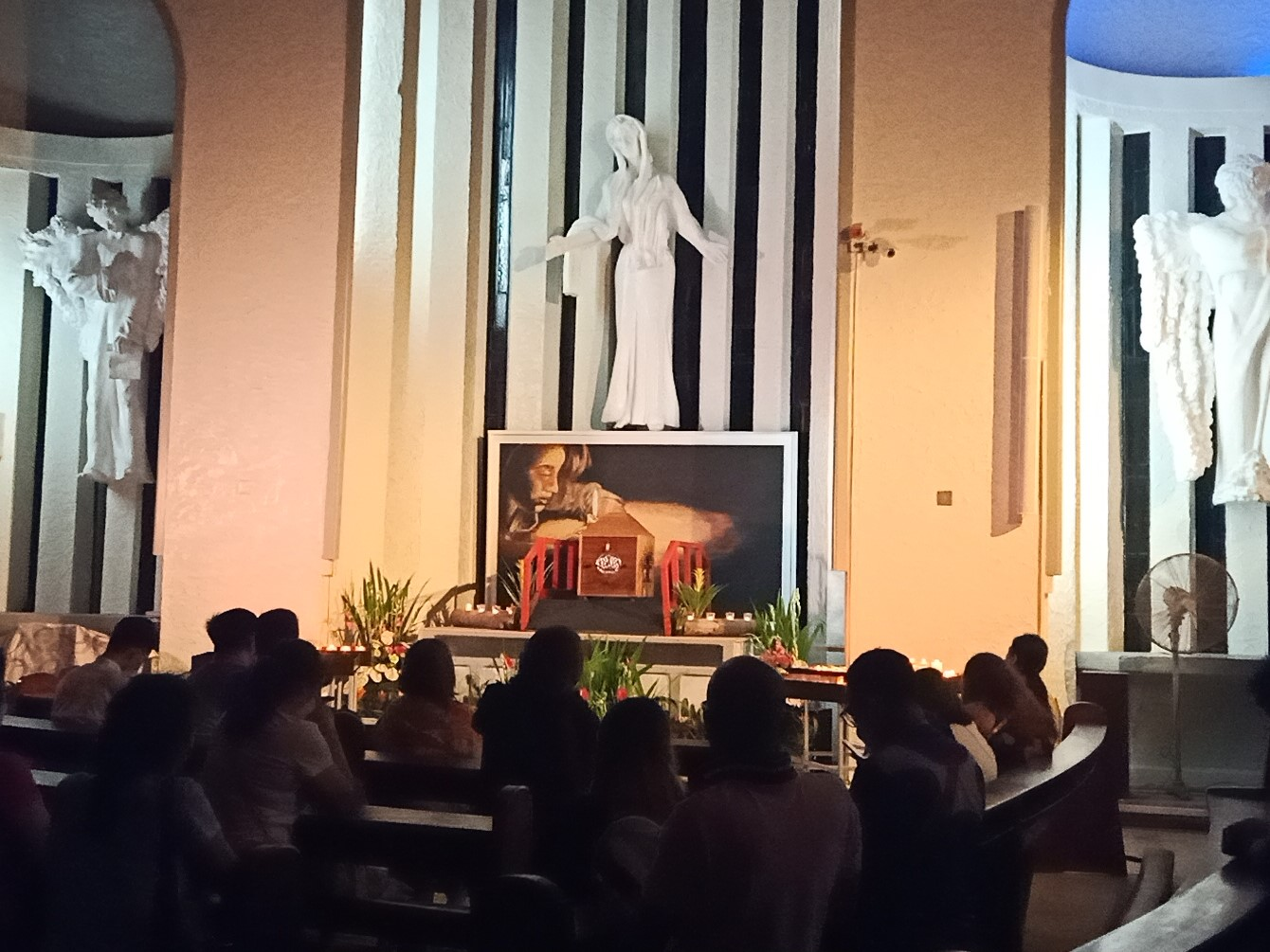
Pilgrims pray before the Altar of Repose at the Shrine of Jesus the Divine Word in Quezon City as part of the Visita Iglesia

One of the most important Holy Week traditions in the Philippines is the Visita Iglesia (Church Visit; also known as the Seven Churches Visitation), a Holy Week practice of visiting and praying in at least seven churches. Throughout the day, worshipers pray the Stations of the Cross inside or outside the church, while at night, the faithful pay obeisance and perform supplications to the Blessed Sacrament within the altar of repose.

In Antipolo, the Alay Lakad (lit. Walk Offering) penitential walk is held from Maundy Thursday to Good Friday, in which devotees walk for 17 kilometers (11 mi) along Sumulong Highway to the Antipolo Cathedral, with some even walking barefoot, and is distinct from the procession from Quiapo Church of the same name held every April 30 and May 1. Upon reaching the cathedral, devotees offer a short prayer or make a wish before tossing coins or paper bills towards the altar. In 2024, 7.4 million devotees visited the cathedral during the penitential walk. As of 2025, the Roman Catholic Diocese of Antipolo is applying for a Guinness World Record for recognition of its being the "Largest Gathering for a Walking Spiritual Pilgrimage in 12 Hours".

== Good Friday ==
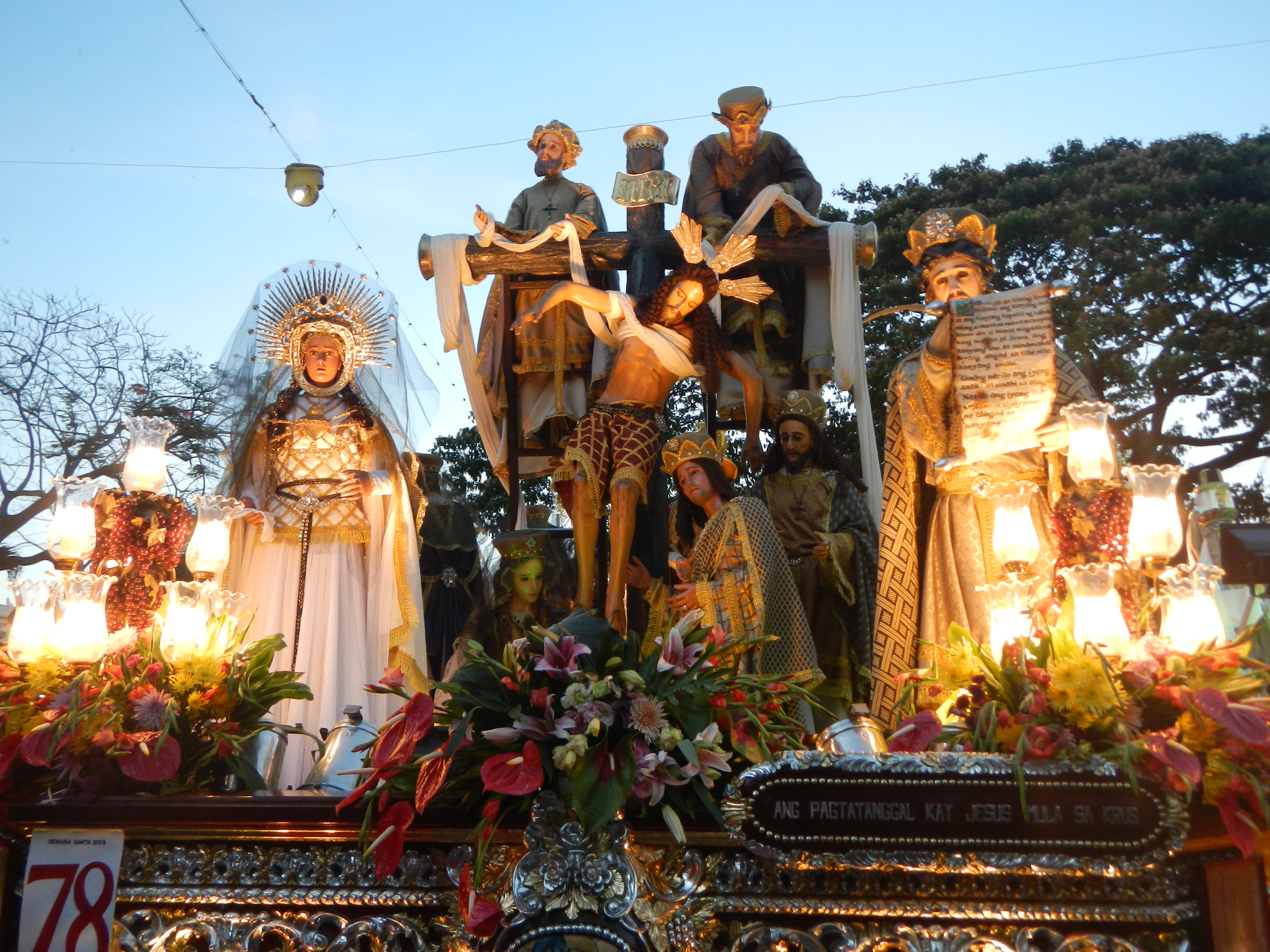
One of the 127 carrozas of the grand procession in Baliwag

Good Friday (Biyernes Santo) is the second public holiday of the week, and considered the most solemn day of the year. It is observed with street processions; the Way of the Cross; sermons and prayers with meditation on Jesus' Seven Last Words (Siete Palabras); and the staging of the Passion Play (Senákulo), which in some places already began on Palm Sunday.

The Baliwag Good Friday procession is the longest Lenten procession in the Philippines. Baliwag, Bulacan, currently has 127 statues and scenes portraying the life of Christ. This activity, well-attended by both local and foreign tourists, follows the main liturgical service of the day.

Mass is not celebrated on this day. Instead, people gather in churches in the afternoon for the Veneration of the Cross and the Mass of the Presanctified, which is similar to the usual Mass but without the Eucharistic consecration as the sacramental bread was already consecrated (presanctified) on Maundy Thursday. The altar had previously been stripped of linens and decorations. Nationwide, the Veneration begins silently in unlit churches at 15:00, remembering the "ninth hour" when Christ died according to the Gospels.

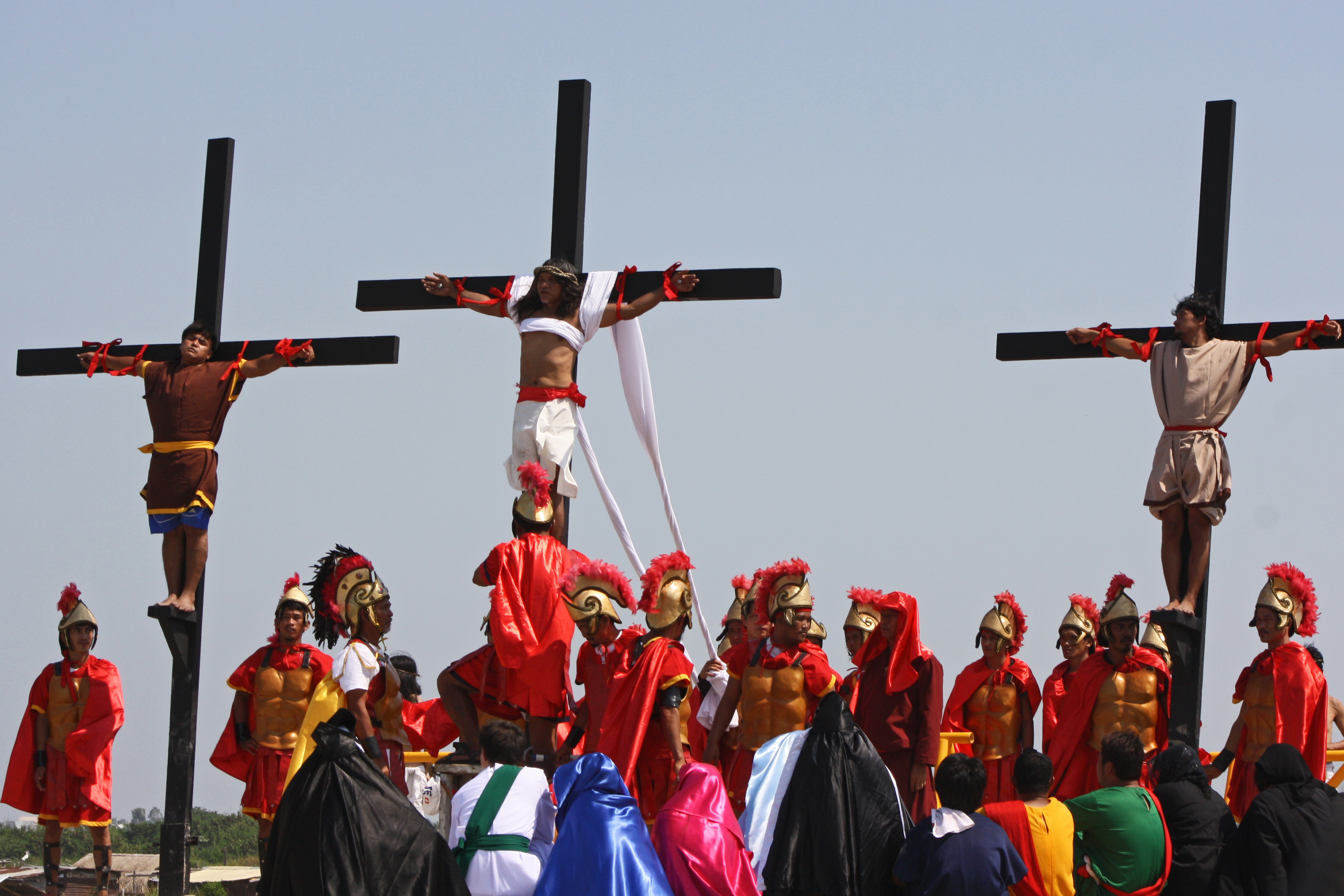
San Pedro Cutud Lenten Rites in San Fernando, Pampanga

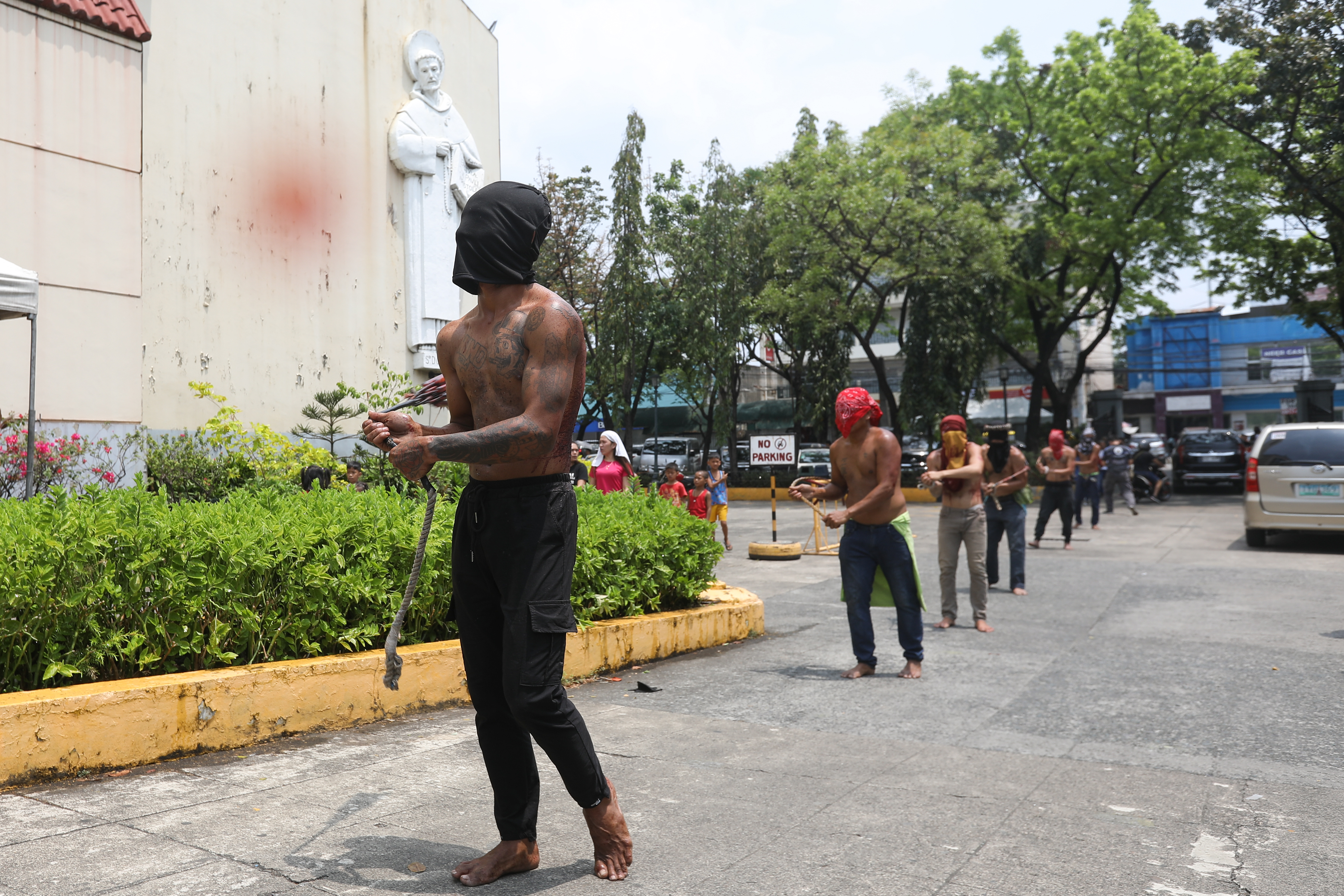
Self-flagellants at Santo Domingo Church in Quezon City

In some places—most famously in the province of Pampanga, where the day is known as Maleldo—processions include devotees who flagellate themselves and sometimes even have themselves nailed to crosses, most notably Ruben Enaje, a carpenter who has been crucified 36 times. While these practices are discouraged by the Church and Department of Health, devotees consider these as personal expressions of penance, whether in fulfilment of a vow or in thanksgiving for a prayer granted. The San Fernando local government says these reenactments are regarded as a part of the province's and the city's cultural heritage. Reenactments of Christ's crucifixion in the village began in 1958, but the first actual crucifixion took place four years later in 1962.

Other penitents, called magdarame, carry wooden crosses, crawl on rough and hot pavement, and slash their backs before whipping themselves to draw blood. This is done to ask for forgiveness of sins, to fulfill vows (panata), or to express gratitude for favors granted.

The pabasa, or continuous chanting, of the Pasyón (the Filipino epic narrative of Christ's life, Passion, Death, and Resurrection), usually concludes on this day before 15:00. Television and radio stations airing special Lenten programming also broadcast the Siete Palabras from large churches in Manila, usually beginning at noon so as to end before the Veneration service.

=== Santo Entierro ===
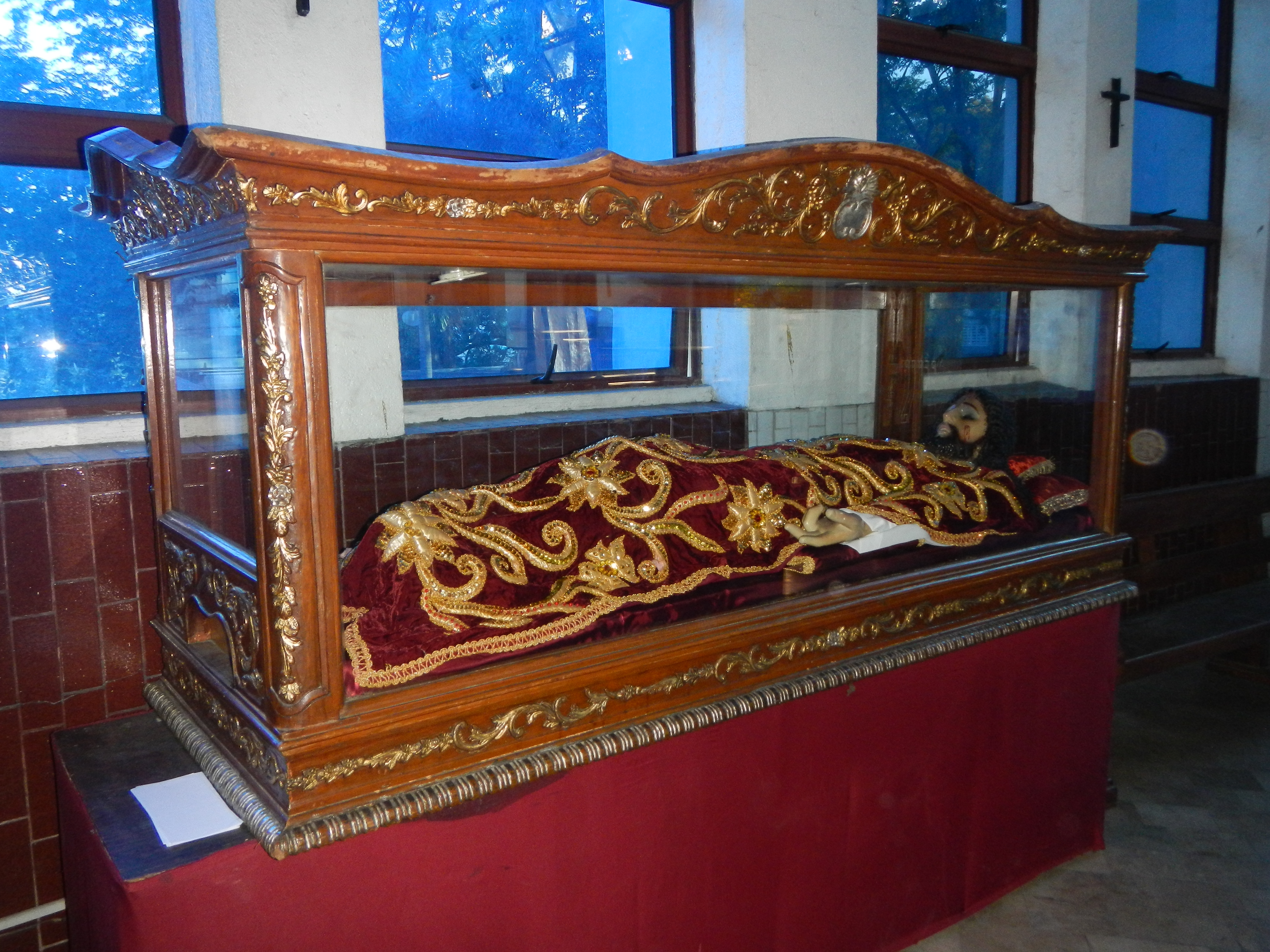
Santo Entierro (Holy Burial) at the National Shrine of Our Lady of Fatima, Valenzuela City

The usual highlight of Good Friday is the Santo Entierro (Holy Burial), which is both the name of the rite itself and of the statue of the dead Christ that is its focus. Comparable to the Eastern Orthodox and Eastern Catholic practice of processing the epitaphios—a liturgical cloth depicting the dead body of Christ—the sculpted image of the Santo Entierro is left bare or covered to the neck in a shroud of red, white, black, or gold. The image is laid in an ornate, flower-decked ceremonial hearse called a calandra (bier) that is brought around in a solemn funeral procession. The retinue is normally composed of images of saints connected to the Passion narrative, such as Peter, Mary Magdalene, and John the Evangelist. Tradition dictates that regardless of the number of images used in the procession, that of the Virgin Mary in black vestments as the Mater Dolorosa (Sorrowful Mother), is alone in her mourning and always the last image as a mark of her importance.

In some places, the Santo Entierro has traditional pre-Christian Filipino funerary rites, such as washing the corpse (the water and cloths given away as holy relics), laying the body in state, or seating the body in a funerary chair. For instance, in Pakil, Laguna, the Santo Entierro is smoked over burning lanzones peelings; and during the procession, the shoulder-borne calandra makes several stops, placed each time on rests above the burning peelings. At each station, a band plays a hymn and then a crier turns towards the bier and three times shouts clearly, melodically, and loudly three times in Spanish, "¡Señor! ¡Misericordia, Señor!" ("Lord! Mercy, Lord!"), which the congregation repeats each time in a melodically penitential low voice.

In Alimodian, Iloilo, the Santo Entierro is placed not by the altar—as is customary elsewhere—but at the church doors for people to venerate, usually by kissing the icon's feet. There is also a large crucifix before the altar for people to venerate and kiss. Later that night, young girls in costume and bearing lit tapers walk barefoot in a second procession with the Mater Dolorosa in and around the town plaza. The girls meditate and mourn, representing Christ's female disciples accompanying the Virgin Mary.

During Maundy Thursday and Good Friday, a gathering of men in Tanay and Taytay, both in Rizal, assemble around the parish church, engaging in feasting and contemplation throughout the night in anticipation of the Santo Entierro statue for the Subok Festival. Various items such as handkerchiefs, bronze medals, and small papers inscribed with Latin phrases are placed within the robe, beneath the feet and in the hands of the deceased Christ. As the Santo Entierro is paraded, these men form a circle by holding hands around the revered statue. Following the procession, these objects are retrieved and regarded as talismans, which the men experiment with by testing their efficacy using various lethal weapons among themselves.

Among the country's famous and elaborate calandras are those of Agoo, Bacolor, Baliwag, Guagua, Molo, Iloilo, Paete, San Pablo, Sasmuan, Silay, and Vigan. Some are centuries old and were commissioned from the famous talleres (studios) of the santeros (saint-maker) Asunción and Máximo Vicente. The image itself, meanwhile, is enshrined for the rest of the year in the church that owns it, or the house of its designated camareros (caretakers).

=== Popular culture ===
Several traditional taboos are customarily observed on Good Friday, such as the avoidance of excessive noisemaking. In older times, bathing (except for health reasons) was prohibited while children in particular were discouraged from outdoor play, with elders cautioning that since "God is dead," evil spirits are freely roaming the earth to harm humans. The prohibitions usually begin after 15:00.

The ritual mourning and generally somber mood of the day gave rise to the Tagalog idiom "Mukhâ kang Biyernes Santo" ("You have a face like Good Friday"). The phrase refers to a sad person's demeanor resembling that of the suffering Christ.

A superstition also exists that consuming meat products on Good Friday will bring misfortune.

== Black Saturday ==
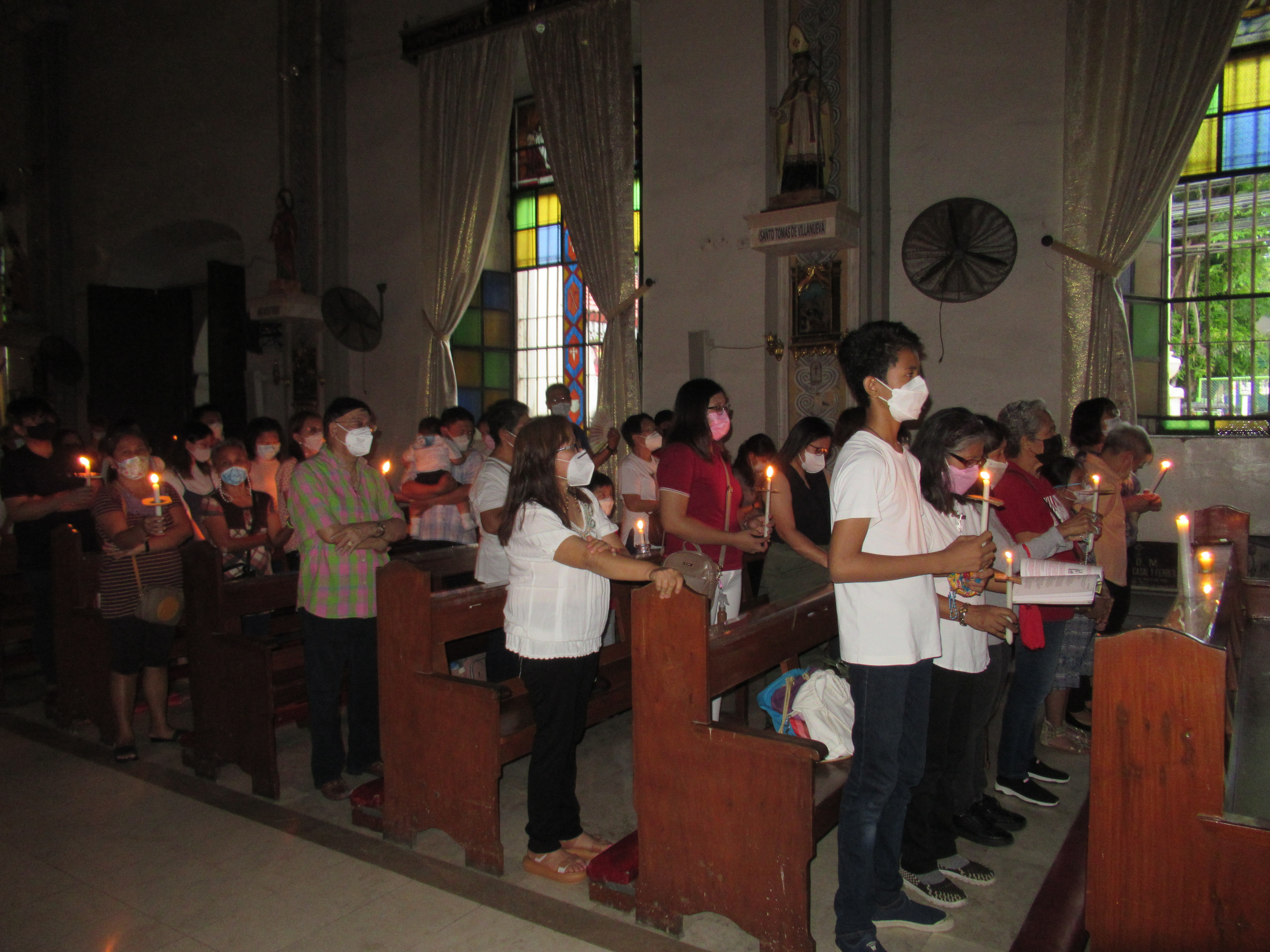
Catholic devotees with candles during the Easter Vigil at Santiago Apostol Church, Plaridel, Bulacan

Black Saturday or Holy Saturday (Sábado de Gloria) is the third and final public holiday of the week. The day is legally and colloquially termed in English as "black" because of the role of that color in mourning. The other popular term of Sábado de Gloria ("Saturday of [the] Gloria”) refers to the return to Masses of the hymn "Gloria in Excelsis Deo" ("Glory to God in the Highest") during the Easter Vigil on this day, as it is not sung during Lent except on certain feast days and Maundy Thursday.

The ritual mourning for the "dead" Christ continues, albeit with less intensity. Traditional taboos from the previous day, such as merrymaking and the consumption of meat, are carried over and customarily broken at midday. This includes swimming in a river or the sea, as superstition warns against bathing on Good Friday afternoon.

Most commercial establishments operate on shorter hours, with smaller enterprises in many areas remaining closed until Easter Sunday or Easter Monday; but some return to normal in major urban areas. Television and radio stations broadcast on shorter hours with special programming. Many remain off-air, although some return to normal broadcasting.

== Easter Sunday ==
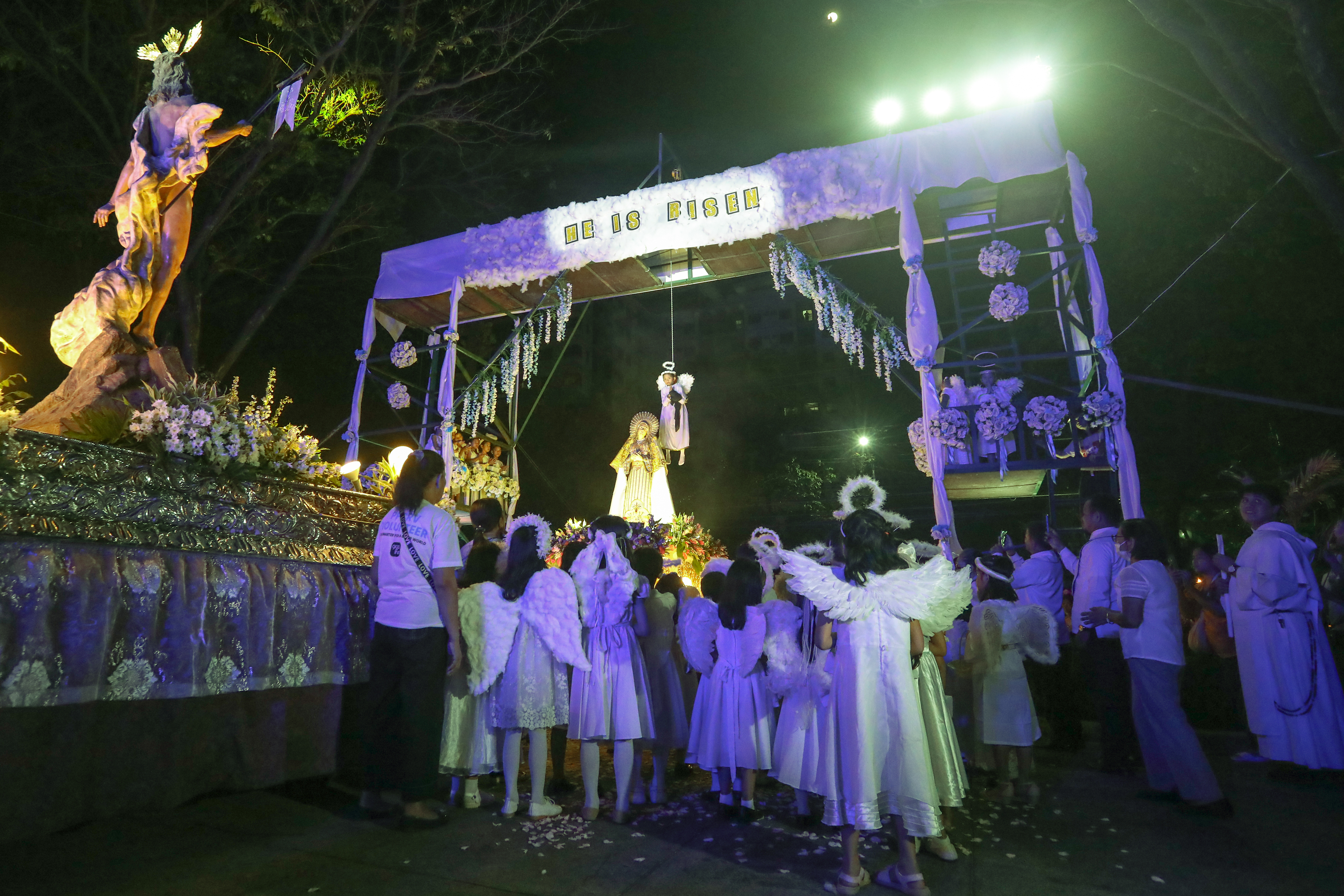
Salubong rite on Easter Sunday at Santo Domingo Church in Quezon City

Easter (Linggo ng Pagkabuhay or Pasko ng Pagkabuhay) is marked with joyous celebrations, the first being the pre-dawn rite called Salubong in Filipino and Sugat in Cebuano and Hiligaynon (both calques of the rite's Spanish name Encuentro, lit. "meeting"). This rite is customarily performed in the early hours of Easter before the first Mass, while some parishes instead hold the rite earlier at midnight immediately after the long Easter Vigil proper.

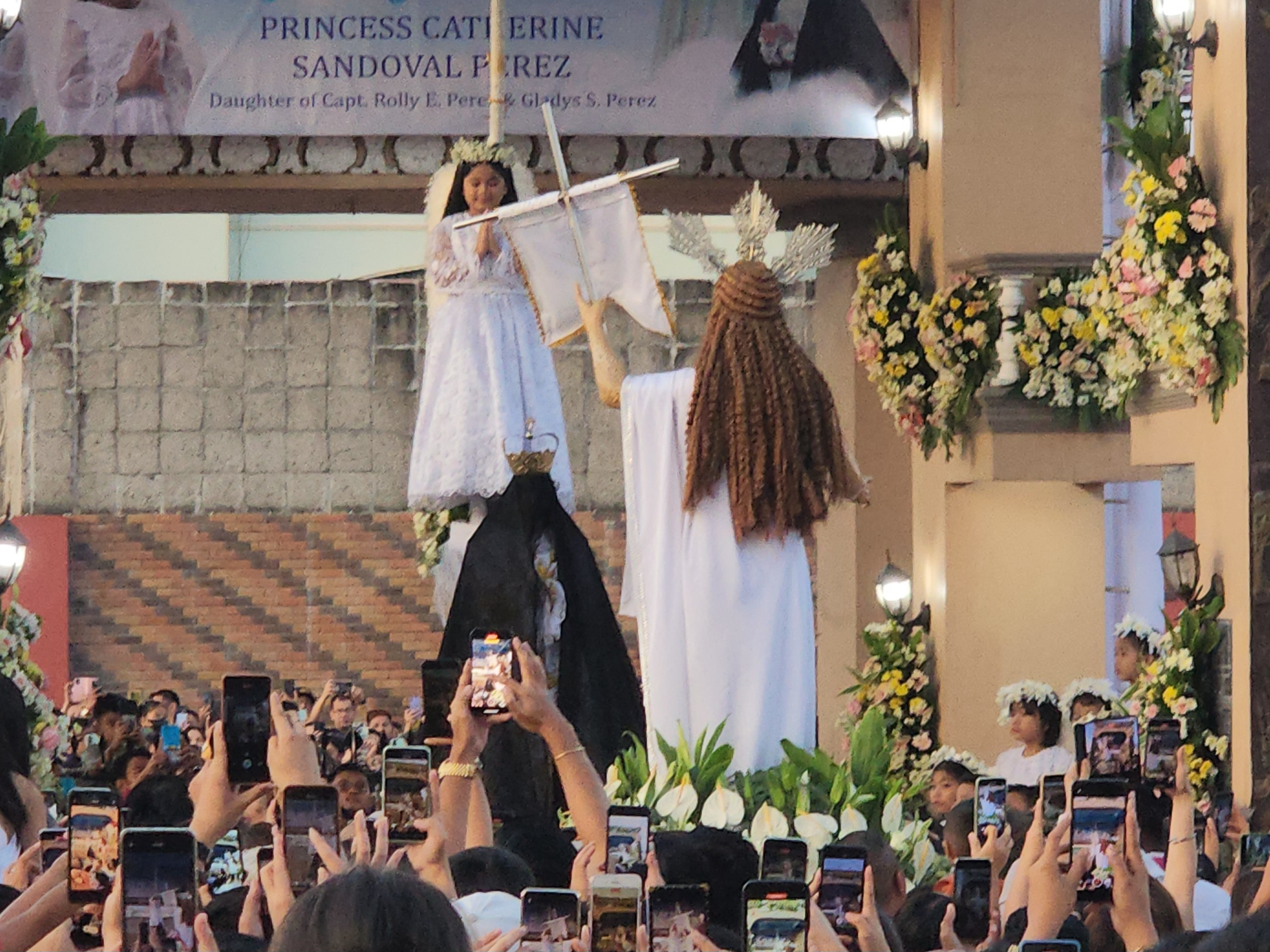
In Batangas province, the Salubong is locally known as Pagdagit

The ritual is meant to depict the apocryphal reunion of Christ and his Mother, the Virgin Mary, after the Resurrection. Statues of both are borne in two separate processions that converge at a designated area called a Galilea ("Galilee"), an open space with a purpose-built scaffold (permanent or otherwise) near the church. Depending on the size and wealth of the congregation, the processions include statues of any or all the Myrrhbearers, particularly the Three Marys, along with St. Peter and St. John the Evangelist. By custom, the two processions are sex-segregated: male worshipers join the Risen Christ, 12 men dressed as the apostles, and icons of male saints; female congregants accompany icons of the Virgin Mary and female saints. Those in the procession hold lit tapers, and often recite the rosary as a brass band plays hymns and joyful music.

The icon of the Virgin Mary, still called the Mater Dolorosa, is clothed or draped in a black veil (Tagalog: lambóng) to show her bereavement. An "angel" (often a small girl in costume) stands at or is suspended in mid-air from the Galilea. From this lofty perch, the angel chants the Marian antiphon "Regina Caeli" ("Queen of Heaven") in Latin or in the vernacular, sometimes accompanied by schoolchildren representing the angelic choirs. The high point is when the main angel dramatically removes the veil from the Virgin's icon, signalling the abrupt end to her grieving and the period of mourning, ritually transforming the image of the sorrowing Virgin into Nuestra Señora de Alegría (Our Lady of Joy). The veil may simply be pulled off the statue, or tied to balloons or doves released into the dawn sky, and at that moment, the angels throw flower petals at the icons of the Christ and the Virgin in celebratory veneration. The moment is punctuated by church bells pealing, brass bands playing, confetti, and fireworks. The reunited congregation then gathers inside the church for the first Mass of Easter Sunday.

== Notable observances and pilgrimage sites ==
=== Minglanilla, Cebu ===
The traditional Sugat in Minglanilla is a yearly spectacle of "little angels" (played by children) descending from the sky held at dawn of Easter Sunday. In later years, this became attached to the cultural Kabanhawan Festival, thus becoming the Sugat-Kabanhawan Festival.

=== Tondo, Manila ===
Caridad or Pakaridad (from the Spanish word for charity) is the custom of giving or sharing food (especially fast-acceptable breads, ginataán, or suman) to neighbors, the local church or chapel, and crowds who attend the Good Friday processions. A complimentary drink of water is also given to worshippers by those living along processional routes.

=== Quiapo, Manila ===
The Black Nazarene icon, brought from Mexico during the Galleon Trade era, is enshrined in Quiapo Church and considered miraculous by devotees. It is brought out for procession every Good Friday, one of three such occasions when this is done—the other two being New Year's Eve and the Feast of the Jesús Nazareno on January 9. The statue is borne on the shoulders of male devotees in a slow, difficult procession around the narrow streets of the district, with a score of men struggling to keep the image moving on as thousands try to push their way to touch the icon as well as the long ropes of its carriage. The procession lasts the whole morning.

The Good Friday processions were suspended in 2020 and 2021 due to the COVID-19 pandemic in the Philippines. In 2022, the Black Nazarene procession returned with a motorcade, but crowd control issues forced organizers to cancel it. A successful motorcade was held in 2023, and in 2024 the traditional form of the procession was restored.

=== Amulet hunting ===
It is a folk belief in the Philippines that antíng-antíng (traditional amulets) are especially potent if collected, made, or imbued with power on Good Friday. In Sipalay, Negros Occidental many albularyo (witch doctors) search for antíng-antíng in unexplored caves. There are types of antíng-antíng for every need: passing exams, childbirth, protection from danger, love, good business, and invincibility. Holy Week also attracts folk healers who gather and showcase their amulets' power in plazas.

On Good Friday, antingeros (talisman aficionados) make pilgrimages to Mount Banahaw, believed to be a sacred mountain, to empower their amulets. Believers in antíng-antíng claim the best time to recharge the spiritual energy of a talisman is the night of Good Friday. Different groups also identify their own special places for recharging their amulets, such as cemeteries, other mountaintops, and churches. Recharging is usually done through repeatedly chanting sets of pseudo-Latin incantations while holding the talisman.

Saints for procession at the St. Catherine of Alexandria Parish, Tayum, Abra

=== Holy Week Processions ===
On Holy Wednesday, a procession is held in Paete, Laguna with its 53 images of Christ's life and death. The procession goes through the town's narrow streets en route to the church. It stops three times for the Salubong ("meeting"), during which Paete's "moving saints" depict each of the three scenes of Jesus' passion: (1) Jesus meets his mother, the Virgin Mary, at the church patio; (2) Saint Veronica wipes the face of Jesus, at Plaza Edesan; and (3) Saint Veronica shows her veil to the Virgin Mary, with its miraculous imprints of Jesus' face, at the town plaza.

In San Pablo, Laguna, the Good Friday procession features large, centuries-old statues bedecked in fresh flowers. The most famous processions in the day were at Saint Bartholomew Parish in Malabon, Metro Manila; Pateros, Metro Manila; Biñan, Laguna; and Tuguegarao, Cagayan. The Cagayan images were destroyed in the Second World War, as were the Tres Caídas ("Three Falls," representing Christ's traditional three falls as he carried his cross) of Biñan.

Saints for procession at the Vigan Cathedral, Vigan City, Ilocos Sur

In the 1970s, the Holy Week procession of Malabon consisted of 30 silver carrozas (floats or carriages). The highlight were the Tres Caídas images, either from Talleres de Máximo Vicente, but these are no longer in the Good Friday procession.

The most famous procession in Manila during the interwar period was in Santa Cruz, but almost all the images were destroyed in the 1945 Battle of Manila. Today, Barangay Población in Makati has a major Holy Wednesday procession aside from the usual one on Good Friday; both also use antique images.

=== Passion plays ===
==== Senákulo ====
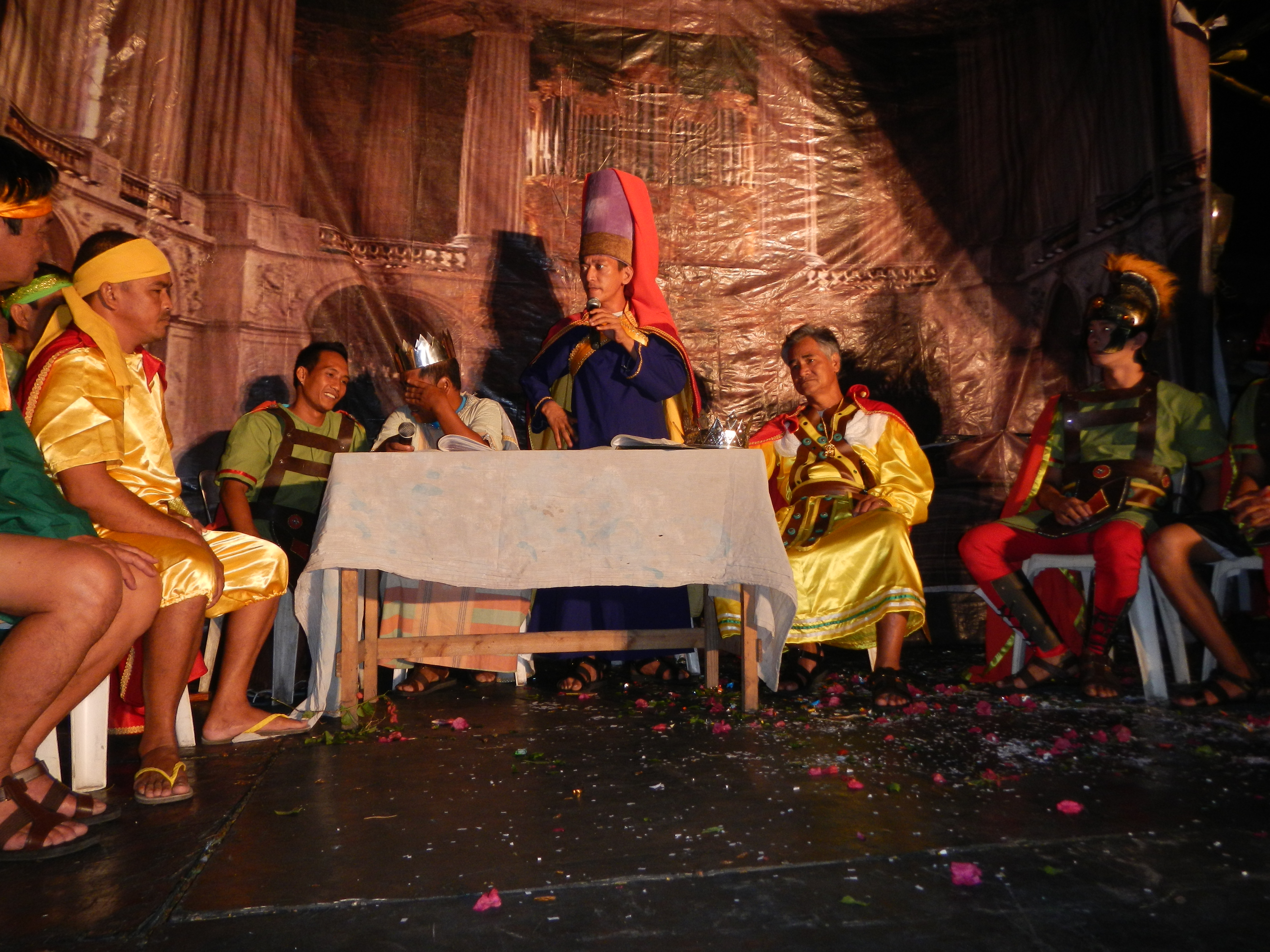
Senákulo in Bulacan

Many towns have their own versions of the Senákulo, the dramatic re-enactment of Christ's Passion and Death, using traditional scripts decades or centuries-old. One version is held at the Cultural Center of the Philippines in Pasay, Metro Manila, sponsored by the Department of Tourism, in which popular film and television stars often join the cast of the play. In Taguig, Metro Manila, the popularized modern version of Jesus Christ Superstar is shown at the Fort Santiago Amphitheater. In Mexico, Pampanga and Dinalupihan, Bataan, the actor portraying Jesus is sometimes actually nailed to the cross to realistically portray the crucifixion.

==== Pagtaltal sa Guimaras ====
Ang Pagtaltal is a passion play staged every Good Friday in Jordan, Guimaras, similar to the Oberammergau Passion Play in southern Bavaria, Germany. Pagtaltal means "to remove," and is the name of the play as its final scene is the Descent from the Cross and the laying of Jesus' body the arms of the Virgin Mary, known in art as the Pietà.

Jordan registered its first festival in Pagtaltal sa Jordan, Guimaras, to take place on Good Friday.

=== Moriones Festival ===
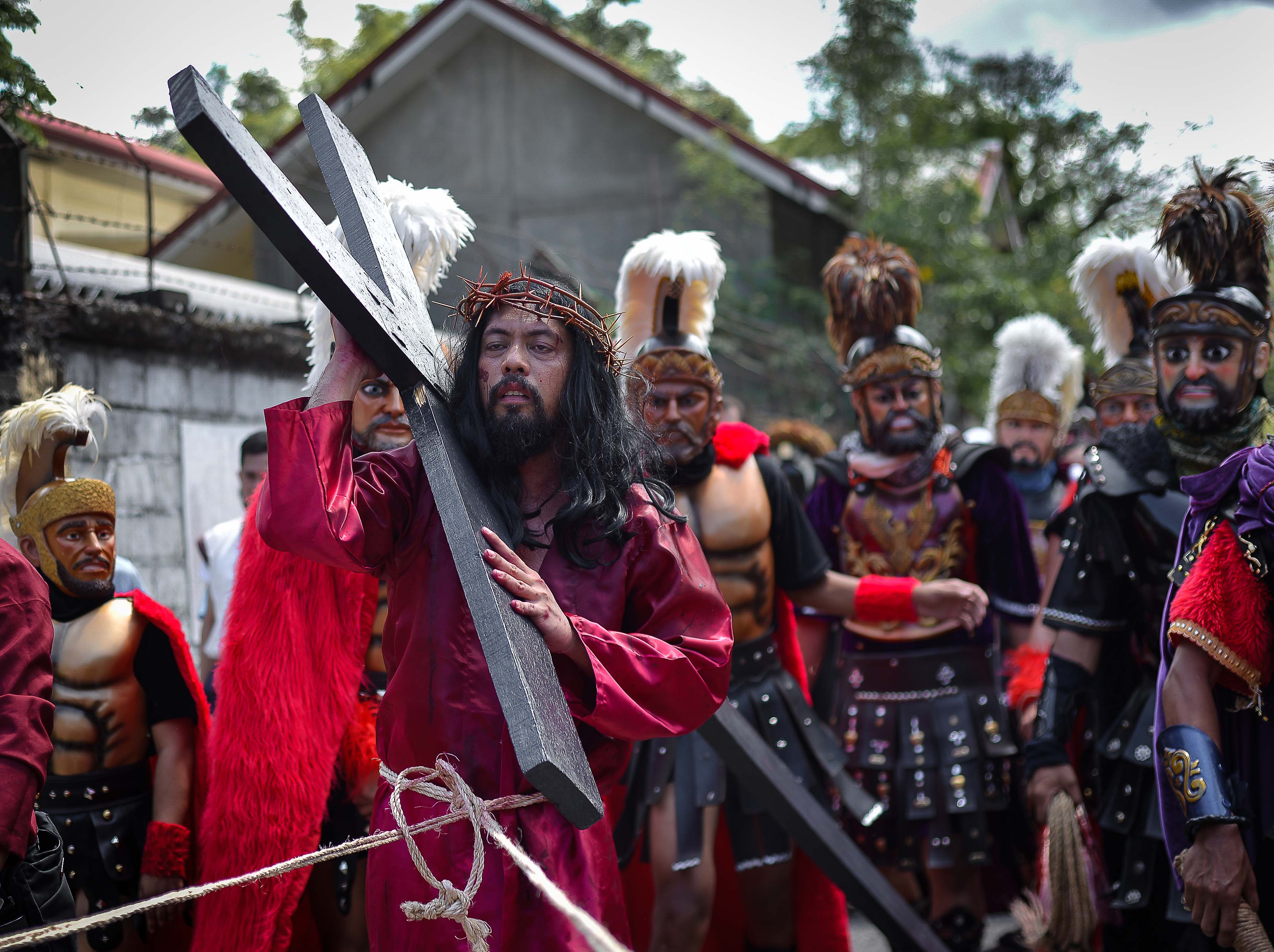
Moriones Walk during the Moriones Festival

The Moriones Festival in the island province of Marinduque commemorates the story of the Roman centurion Longinus (Tagalog: San Longhino) and his legendary conversion at the foot of the cross.

The Moriones Festival is a synthesis of Catholicism and folk mysticism. The townsfolk of Boac, Gasan, and Mogpog dress in masks and helmets (moriones), depicting Roman soldiers. The rest of the locals portray Saint Longinus and hide among the houses while the others search for him. Unlike most of the country, Marinduque observes Holy Week in a much more joyous manner.

=== Salubong dances ===
==== Saboy ====
The Saboy is a traditional dance performed by girls on Easter Sunday in Las Piñas, Metro Manila. The dance is divided into two parts, the "mourning" section and the "joyful" section. The first dancer is the Salubong Angel, who often has large wings and bears a black veil. The second group—comprising most of the dancers— are the Hosanna angels, dressed in white, who usually hold baskets with rose petals. The third group are the Tres Marías (Three Marys): three older girls dressed in pink and bearing baskets. Last are the blue-clad kapitana (captainess) and tinyentera (female lieutenants). The kapitana is distinguished by the large banner she waves, while the tinyentera swing thuribles.

==== Sayaw ng Pagbatì ====
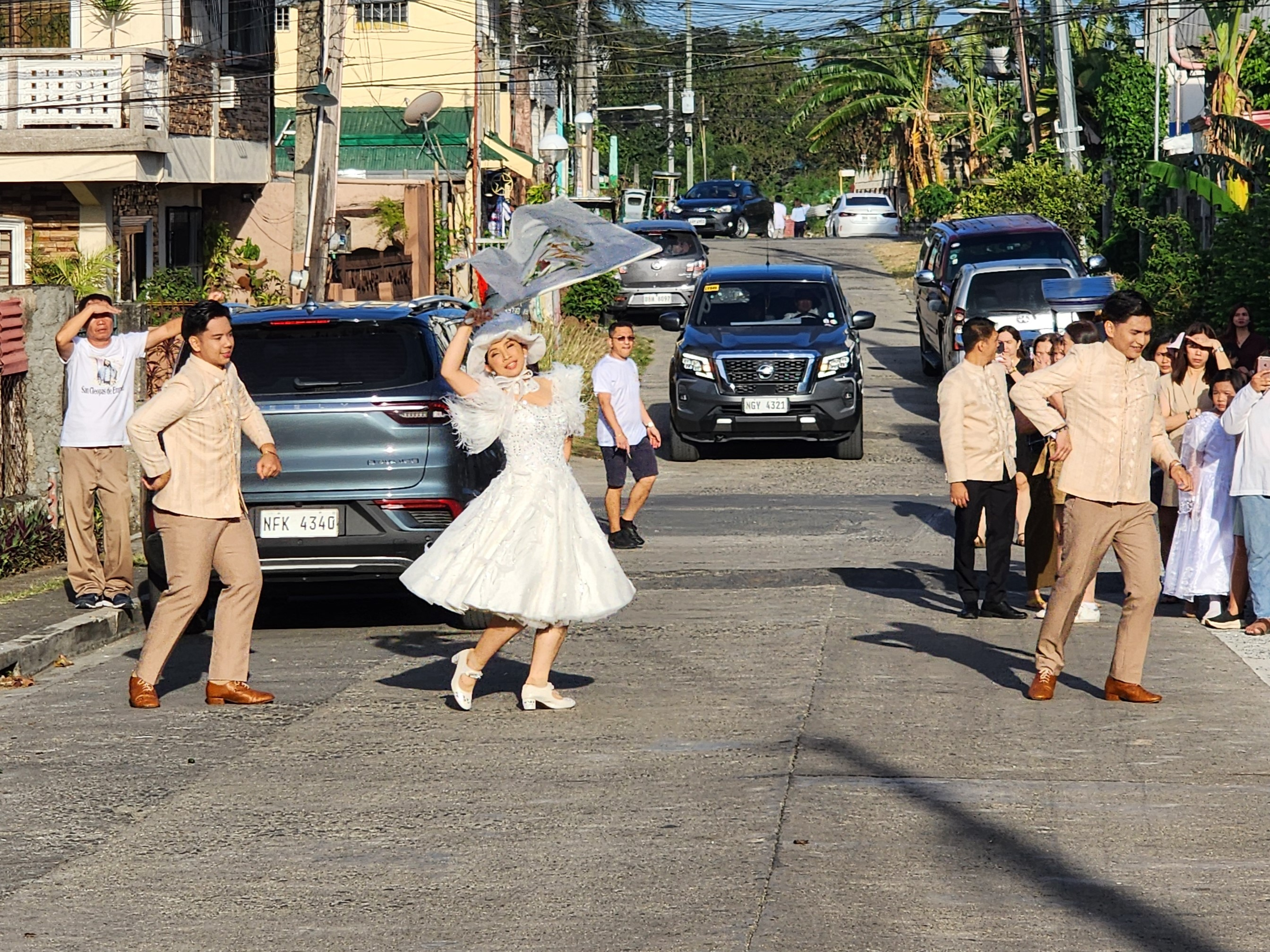
Sayaw ng Pagbatì in Ibaan, Batangas

The Sayaw ng Pagbatì (Dance at the Greeting or Welcome Dance)—or Bati-bati for short— is an Easter ritual dance that illustrates the joy of the faithful at the Resurrection. The precise form of the dance varies among towns, with the most prominent ones performed in Angono, Rizal, and Ibaan, Batangas, as well as in Parañaque, Metro Manila.

In Parañaque, Metro Manila, the Sayaw ng Pagbatì is the city's official cultural dance. On Easter Sunday morning after Mass and the Salubong, beribboned girls from the various barangays of Parañaque clad in white gowns file in front of Saint Andrew's Cathedral in the barangay of La Huerta to dance in long formations. Accompanied by marching bands or a recording, they dance and wave wands in the air for hours until noon.

In Ibaan, Batangas, the version of the dance consists of a lady who acts as the kapitana, similar to the Saboy but accompanied by two male escorts. In nearby Rosario, the Pagbatì is traditionally performed by three young ladies to the music of a local brass band. They are dressed in white for the morning Easter Sunday dance. The dance is accompanied by gracefully waving a flag.

In Angono, Rizal, the traditional Salubong rites consist of a kapitana and tinyenta who perform a religious dance to the tune of Batì. The tinyenta is the first to perform the dance to the tune of a gavotte. Then, the kapitana recites from memory the traditional poem offered to the Virgin Mary, called Dicho (a short expression of a general truth or wisdom) and consisting of 31 stanzas and 124 verses. Finally, the kapitana performs her dance to the tune of a valse (waltz).

In Taytay, Rizal, the traditional Easter greeting dance consisting of the kapitana and her four mga konsehala (councilwomen) was revived in March 2023. The kapitana and mga konsehala represent the town's first five barangays: Dolores, San Isidro, Santa Ana, San Juan, and Muzon.

In Cainta, Rizal, the rites consist of a kapitana who performs the dance to the tune of a marcha and modanza. The four captainesses (kapitana apatan) represent the barangays of Cainta: San Roque, San Andrés, San Juan, and the former Barrio Dayap (since partitioned into Barangays Santo Domingo, Santa Rosa, and Santo Niño).

== See also ==
- Binignit
- Black Nazarene
- Good Friday processions in Baliwag
- Holy Week in Paete
- Hispanic influence on Filipino culture
- Pasyón
- Eat Bulaga! Lenten Specials
