= Pasyon =

Philippine epic narrative on the life of Jesus Christ, recited often during Lent

Pasyóng Mahál
- Cover of a typical edition of the Pasyóng Mahál, featuring a depiction of the Black Nazarene of Quiapo.
- Author: Gaspar Aquino de Belén
- Original title: Pasióng Mahal
- Language: Tagalog, other Philippine languages
- Genre: epic poetry, narration, religious, prayer
- Publication date: 1704
- Publication place: Philippines
- Media type: Print
- Pages: ± 240

The Pasyón (Spanish: Pasión) is a Philippine epic narrative of the life of Jesus Christ, focused on his Passion, Death, and Resurrection. In stanzas of five lines of eight syllables each, the standard elements of epic poetry are interwoven with a colourful, dramatic theme.

The uninterrupted chanting or pabasa (“reading”) of the entire book from start to end is a popular Filipino Catholic devotion during the Lenten season, particularly during Holy Week.

In 2011, the Pabasa was cited by the National Commission for Culture and the Arts as one of the Intangible Cultural Heritage of the Philippines under the Performing Arts category that the government may nominate for inclusion in the UNESCO Intangible Cultural Heritage Lists.

== History ==
The text is an adaptation of the pre-Hispanic Filipino art of chanting epic poems as a part of oral tradition. After Christianity was introduced by the Spaniards in the 16th century, the Passion cycle was adapted into this native narrative form.

The indigenous form of the Pasyón was first written down by Gaspar Aquino de Belén in Ang Mahal na Pasión ni Jesu Christong Panginoon Natin na Tola (modern orthography: Ang Mahál na Pasyón ni Hesukristong Panginoón Natin na Tulâ, "The Sacred Passion of Jesus Christ, Our Lord, Which is a Poem"), written in 1703 and approved in 1704.

An 1852 recension by Aniceto de Merced, El libro de la vida ("The Book of the Life [of Jesus]") did not gain popularity with the masses.

=== Pasyóng Genesís ===
The most popular Tagalog version of the Pasyón today is the Casaysayan nang Pasiong Mahal ni Hesucristong Panginoon Natin na Sucat Ipag-alab nang Puso nang Sinomang Babasa (modern orthography: Kasaysayan ng Pasyóng Mahál ni Hesukristong Panginoón Natin na Sukat Ipág-alab ng Pusò ng Sínumang Babasa, "The History of the Passion of Jesus Christ Our Lord, which Rightly Shall Ignite the Heart of Whosoever Readeth").

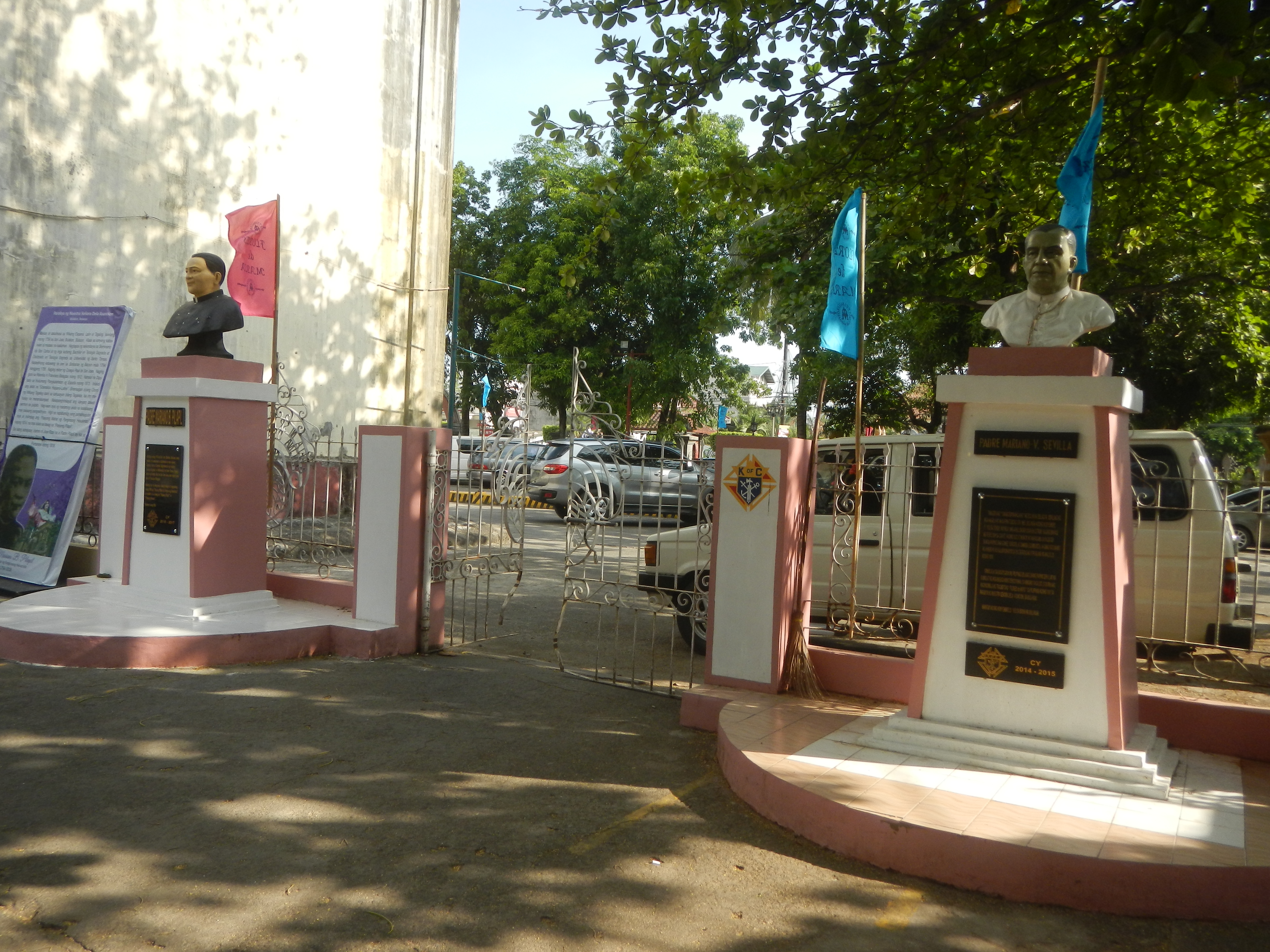
Busts of Mariano V. Sevilla and Mariano B. Pilapil, Bulakan Church.

This version is also called the Pasyóng Genesís as the Genesis creation narrative immediately follows the prayer to the Blessed Virgin Mary and a Trinitarian catechesis, and precedes the main section concerning the Life of Christ. Another name for this text is Pasyóng Pilapil, after the foreword by The Rev. Dr. Mariano Pilapil, found in the 1814 edition. The book's title page describes it as being commissioned by Archbishop of Manila José Seguí, O.S.A., and former Augustinian provincial Fr Manuel Grijalvo, O.S.A., with corrections to Latin terms and phrases done by a certain Fr Amador W. Cruz.

A still widely-circulated reprint of the Pasyóng Genesís is the 1949 edition, whose title begins with Awit at Salaysay... ("Song and Narrative") instead of Casaysayan. It was published by Ignacio Luna and Sons, Co., in Santa Cruz, Manila.

== Devotional use ==
Sample text from the 1949 Pasyóng Genesís, showing the opening prayers invoking God the Father and the Blessed Virgin Mary. These are followed by the Creation narrative, beginning with a catechesis on the Triune Godhead.

The Pasyón is normally heard during Holy Week in the Philippines, where its recitation is known as the pabása ("reading"). The rite can span one to several days, extending no later than Black Saturday, depending on the speed of the chanters. It is often concluded on Good Friday at noon or before 3:00 PM PST (UTC+8) – the “ninth hour” of Jesus' death on the Cross according to the Gospels.

Pabasa ng Pasyon (Reading of the Passion of Christ) in Barangay Krus na Ligas, Diliman, Quezon City

Devotees chant the Pasyón from beginning to end uninterrupted; this non-stop recitation is made possible by chanting in turns. Chanters usually perform this rite as a panatà ("vow"), or votive offering in request, or as an ex voto in thanksgiving. While chanters are frequently older women and some men, more younger Filipinos have lately shown interest in the devotion.

The Pasyón is almost always chanted facing the family’s permanent house altar, or a temporary altar with religious icons, particularly those related to the suffering and death of Jesus. Temporary altars may be built inside or outside the house for the devotion, with outdoor booths and venues decorated with palm leaf walls. The pabasa may also be performed at a local visita/kapilya (chapel of ease) or some other community space, and even the sides of streets.

As per Filipino etiquette, the host of the pabasa (often the master or lady of the house) is responsible for preparing refreshments for the shifts of chanters and other guests.

=== Musical setting ===
There are fixed, traditional melodies or tono for the Pasyón that have been passed down through the centuries. These vary according to local or even familial custom, and the tono shifts depending on the type of section being chanted (e.g. prayer, narrative, or moral). Recent innovations include setting the epic to modern ballads, pop music, and contemporary hymns; in some places, a rap or hip hop style is used especially by youths, but in 2012 the practice of "rap pabasa" was banned by authorities in Valenzuela as it was deemed irreverent and violated the solemnity of the occasion. Pedro Quitorio III, spokesman for the Catholic Bishops' Conference of the Philippines, saw nothing wrong with the youths' take on the Pasyón: “What is important is the intention. But there should be reverence because it’s also not good if it’s not solemn.”

Instrumental accompaniment to the Pabasa is not as popular nor uniform in practice, as most devotees would chant a capella, using tonos from memory. If there is accompaniment, the guitar and electronic keyboard are commonly used, or a live concert band.
