= Pabasa (ritual) =

Catholic devotional chant

An elderly woman chanting a verse of the Pasyon in the Kapampangan language

Pabása ng Pasyón (Tagalog for "Reading of the Passion"), known simply as Pabása is a Catholic devotion in the Philippines popular during Holy Week involving the uninterrupted chanting of the Pasyón, an early 16th-century epic poem narrating the life, passion, death, and resurrection of Jesus Christ. The verses are based on the bible and practiced every holy week.

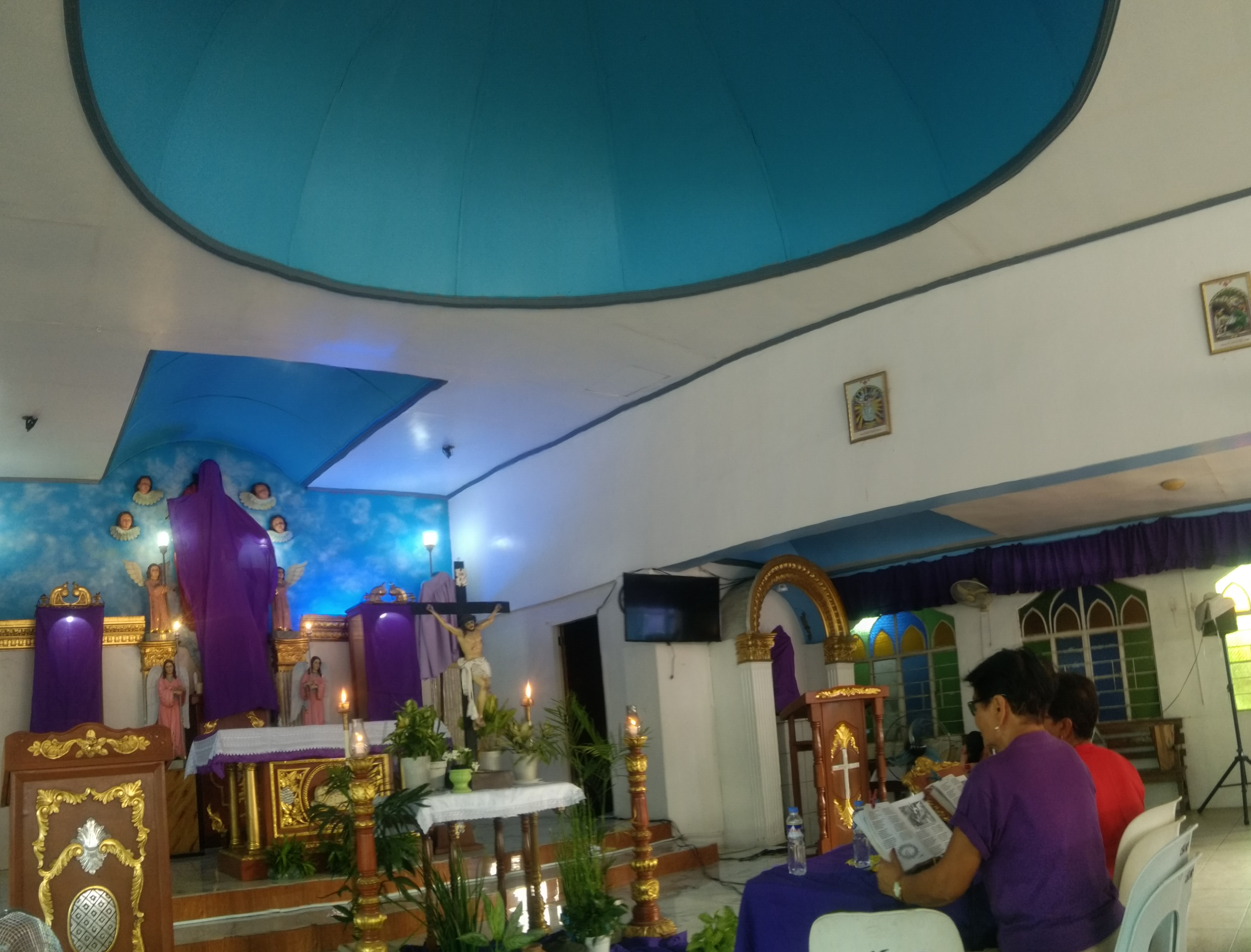
Pabasa in Arayat, Pampanga

== Description ==
Readers are usually groups of individuals taking turns in chanting verses from the book known as the Pasyon, as a devotion made in fulfilment of a panatà (this may be a vow, votive offering in request, or thanksgiving). The modern-day Pabasa may be chanted a cappella or with the accompaniment of musical instruments such as the guitar, accordion, piano, or by a rondalla ensemble.

There are two common styles of chanting, the first of which is the alternate singing of two persons or two groups of people. The second method has each chanter or group of chanters taking turns in singing the stanzas.

== Origins ==
Before evolving into the contemporary ritual, early forms of the Pabasa were introduced to the various indigenous peoples of the archipelago by Spanish friars spreading the Christian faith. Over the period of Spanish colonial rule from the late 16th century until 1898, indigenous Filipinos adapted the religious chanting of the Spanish priests and incorporated it to the ancient custom of singing epics during celebrations. The vocal singing style has in many ways, preserved the pre-Hispanic singing techniques of the main groups of the country, like the Tagalog, Kapampangan, Ilocano and Bicolano ethnic groups.

== Duration ==
The reading and chanting ritual, which is more common in rural areas, may be sponsored by local religious organisations. The Pabasa is done continuously day and night and usually lasts for three consecutive days. The Pabasa may begin on Palm Sunday or Holy Monday, the second day of Holy Week; or it may also start in the afternoon of Maundy Thursday. The pabasa usually ends on Good Friday on 12 noon or before 3:00 PM PHT (GMT+8) – the traditional hour of Jesus' death on the cross (or even as late as Black Saturday, the penultimate day of Holy Week).

== Punto (tunes) ==
The original punto (tunes) used in the chanting are generally not sight sung (singing by interpreting the notes in a sheet music), but rather chanted by memory. Other punto are based on the melodies of old popular songs, like Aloha 'Oe.

=== Katagalugan ===
A verse/quintilla of Kapampangan Pasyon chanted using the tune Tonong Maynila/Tonong Tagalog

In the Tagalog regions (Metro Manila, Bulacan, etc.), the tunes used in chanting the Pasyon are simpler and may be easily learnt. The tonong Tagalog/Maynila (Tagalog/Manila tune) is the most well known tune by the chanters in the whole country.

==== Aregade-gadeng ====
A verse of the Tagalog Pasyon chanted using the tune Aregadegadeng

This tune is famous for its syllabes "aregade-gadeng" pronounced at each line of the verse or quintilla.

==== Tono ng Paglilibing ====
Tune of the Paglilibing, the first two verses of the burial of Christ is read

This tune is used by the chanters of the province of Rizal in the Tagalog Region. This is exclusively used for the section/chapter of the Tagalog Pasyon titled Ang Paglilibing sa Ating Panginoong Hesukristo (The Burial of our Lord Jesus Christ).

=== Pampanga ===
The tunes only used in the province of Pampanga are more complex and difficult to learn. They are described as melancholy, wailing, powerful with very long melisma.

There are four classification of tunes used by the chanters in Pampanga, they are the sane (hants), pamuntu, pasadoble, and memorial. The sane are the traditional tunes sung in Pampanga, they have wailing sounds and very long melisma thus making them difficult to learn, these sounds originated from the traditional tunes used by the ethnic tribes of Asia.

==== Sane San Fernando ====
Sane San Fernando

The most used Sane sung by most of Kapampangans inside or outside of Pampanga such as in Tarlac is the Sane San Fernando. It is described as more melancholic than the other Sanes. Named after the City of San Fernando, it is considered as the tune that unifies Pampanga and the Kapampangan chanters.

==== Sane Angeles ====
Sane Angeles complex form

The simple form of Sane Angeles

Named after the City of Angeles, this tune is primarily heard in Angeles and its neighboring city Mabalacat and other neighboring municipalities. It has a complex form and a simple form. The complex form is full of melisma and wailing sound making it fall under the category of Sane. The simple form however, does not contain any melisma and only sung in the fundamental notes of the complex form; making it ideal to be sung when the verses being read do not require to be chanted with complexity.

==== Sane Candaba ====
This tune is only used but not exclusively, in the town of Candaba; it might also be heard in the barangays of Arayat near the boundary of Candaba. This is considered as the hardest tune used in the pabasa of Pampanga. Its complexity is the reason why only the people of Candaba use it. The way it is chanted has a similarity with the Sane Angeles but it has more complex melisma at the end of each line.

== See also ==
- Gregorian chant
- Saint Roch
- Obando fertility rites
