= Good Friday processions in Baliwag =

Annual religious event in Bulacan, Philippines

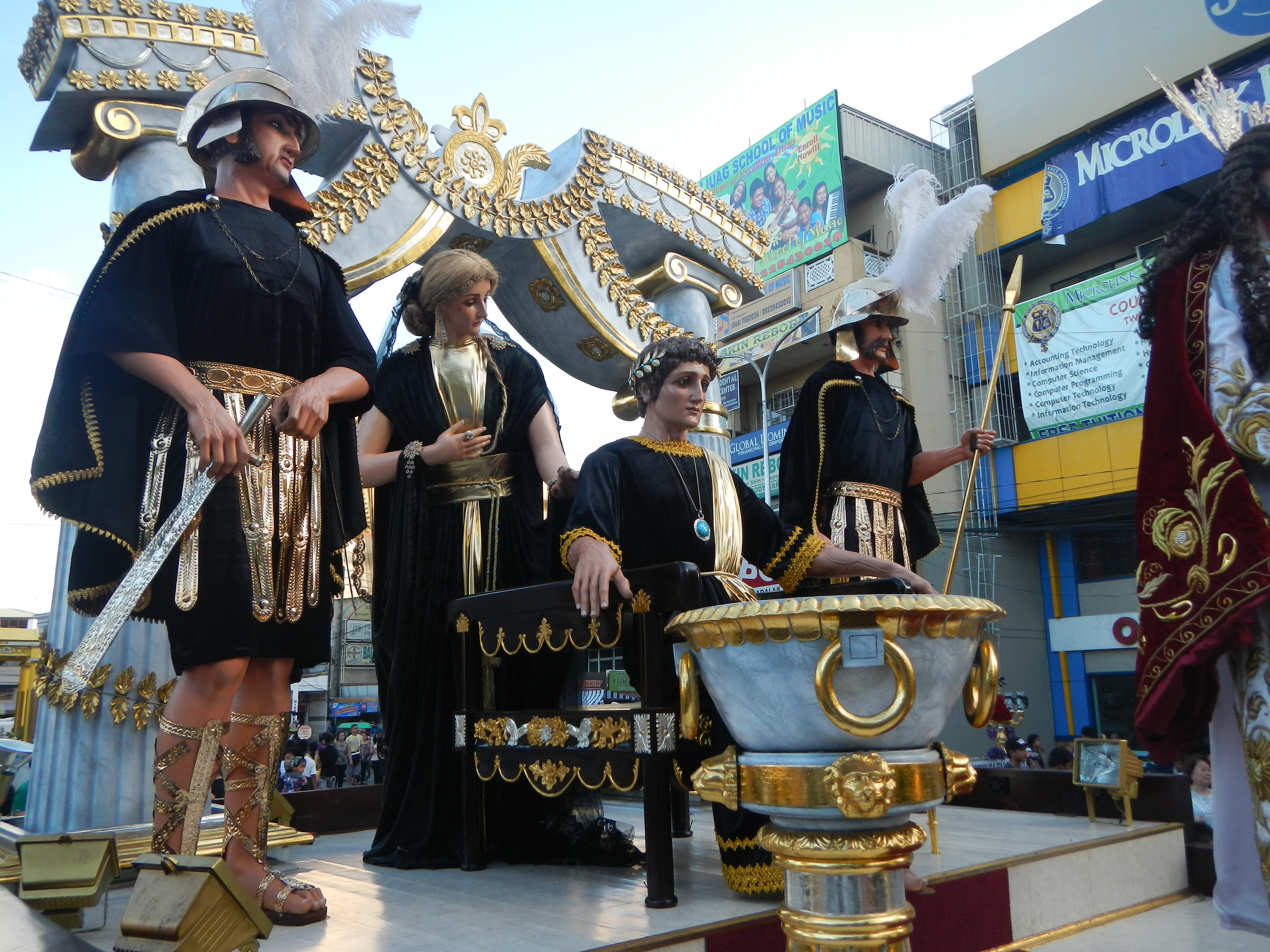
One of the 126 floats (carrozas; 'carriages') of holy images of the Good Friday procession in Baliuag, Philippines (April 7, 2023)

The Good Friday procession (or Holy Week procession) in Baliuag, Bulacan, Philippines, is a religious procession that takes place during Holy Week in the traditional Roman Catholic culture of the St. Augustine Parish Church of Baliuag. It is the longest Lenten procession in the Philippines, followed by the Holy Week procession from the San Isidro Labrador Parish from the nearby town of Pulilan.

In the Philippines, Good Friday (Note: The etymology of the term 'good' in 'Good Friday' is contested. Some sources claim it is from the senses pious, holy of the word 'good', while others contend that it is a corruption of 'God Friday'.) is a religious holiday observed primarily by Christians commemorating the crucifixion of Jesus Christ and his death at Calvary. The holiday is observed during Holy Week as part of the Paschal Triduum on the Friday preceding Easter Sunday, and may coincide with the Jewish observance of Passover. It is also known as Holy Friday, Great Friday, Black Friday, or Easter Friday, though the latter properly refers to the Friday in Easter week. Observance of Holy Week may involve a procession. Biblical examples of processions include the procession with the Ark of the Covenant and the procession of Jesus on a donkey into Jerusalem.

== Description ==
The procession features large carrozas ('floats', 'carriages') richly decorated with brass or wood motifs, flowers, and lights and mounted with life-sized antique dioramas (religious heirlooms). The images visually display Christian stories and teachings, and represent a "moving catechism" for spectators. The decorated floats are showcased in grand parade which culminates in the blessing with holy water of the floats and the faithful by two Baliuag priests from the Team Ministry of the Diocese of Malolos.

Held annually on Holy Wednesday and Good Friday, the procession starts at 6:00 in the evening. The preparation and procession of these carrozas through the city streets takes 6–8 hours. The grand procession of images is an anticipated attraction on these days.

== History ==
The procession was started by the Augustinian Missionaries who founded Baliwag and established the church on May 26, 1733. Fray Juan de Albarran, O.S.A. was the first pastor. In Baliwag, Then and Now (1985), author Rolando Villacorte states the procession is 291 years old.

The oldest record about the procession of Baliuag can be seen on the carriage of "Sancta Maria Mater Angustia": a label engraved with "1863" under the names Fray Fausto Ambrosio López Palomino, O.S.A. and Fray Matías Novoa, O.S.A. The oldest image is reported to be the "Pietà" carroza. Ronald Sauco, a 7th generation caretaker (Sauco family), owns the 400-year-old image of Saint Mary Salome. "Camarero" Flordeliza Trinidad-Sarmiento inherited from her grandmother the carroza of Candelaria Trinidad, the 100-year-old Saint Veronica in the "karo", one of the first 17 carriages paraded since 1863. From the 1950s, the procession of the carrozas was held under Rev. Fr. Ruperto T. Del Rosario, Bishop Amado Paulino y Hernandez (1969–1985), and Bishop Leopoldo A. Arcaira, who encouraged the faithful to sponsor additional carrozas to showcase local artistry and craftsmanship.

In 2012, the Baliuag Lenten Procession was witnessed by local and foreign tourists, including Archbishop Giuseppe Pinto, the Apostolic Nunciature to the Philippines' Apostolic Nuncio at that time.

The Good Friday procession is preceded by the ritual of "Pagtatayo ng Krus" at 6:00 a.m.; followed by "Pagsundo" ("Dapit") with serenata of Santo Entierro, including the parade of Saint Dimas and Hestas images; followed by "Dapit" with serenata for Mater Dolorosa, Crucifixion, seven sayings of Jesus on the cross, Removal from the Cross, Burial of Jesus, and Mass of the Presanctified.

== Carrozas ==
The original 17 colorful images and carriages expanded in 1966 following a trend to own at least 6-foot-tall statues. In 1987, yearly palabas had only 60 images, handled by "Hermandad Del Siete Dolores".

In 2013, 96 carrozas participated, compared to some 80 in previous years.

In 2017 there were approximately 117 carrozas, compared to 114 in 2016. In 2018, the total was 118, and by 2019 there were 121. When the procession returned in 2022 after a two-year break, an additional float was added, making 122 carrozas. In 2023, the number reached 126, and 127 in 2024. As of 2025, there were 128 carrozas.

In the 2023 Holy Wednesday and Good Friday processions, 126 carriages were expected to join the procession but less participated.

The 2024 Holy Wednesday and Good Friday Processions were the longest Philippine Lenten processions in the country, with over 127 life-sized or larger statues depicting the Way of the Cross were paraded through the streets. The processions started at 6:00 p.m. from the church patio to Plaza Naning and back before blessing at 11:30 p.m. Featured floats included "San Pedro" (Note: Chico, Rodriguez, and Maria Victoria Santa Maria from Patriarch Vicente Santa Maria) (No. 1) and "Virgen Dolorosa" (Note: (1) Palm Sunday: Ms. Adoracion Esteban; (2) Holy Wednesday: Fr. Federico M. Ramos III from Federico T. Ramos Sr.; (3) Good Friday: Christina Vda. De Cruz family) (No. 127, the last).

== See also ==
- St. Augustine Parish Church of Baliuag
- Holy Week in the Philippines
- Processions
- Good Friday
- Crucifixion of Jesus
- Good Friday Prayer
- Improperia
- Life of Jesus in the New Testament

=== Related days ===
- Ascension
- Easter Monday
- Easter season
- Maundy Thursday
- Pentecost
