= Hosanna =

Liturgical word in Judaism and Christianity

Hosanna (/hoʊˈzænə/) is an Hebrew-derived liturgical acclamation used in Judaism and Christianity. In Judaism it is a cry expressing an appeal for God’s help. In Christianity it is a cry of praise.

== Etymology ==
The word hosanna (Latin osanna, Greek ὡσαννά, hōsanná) is from Hebrew הוֹשִׁיעָה־נָּא, הוֹשִׁיעָה נָּא hôšîʿâ-nā, and especially the short form הוֹשַׁע נָּא hôšâ-nā, and related to Aramaic ܐܘܿܫܲܥܢܵܐ (ʾōshaʿnā) meaning 'save, rescue, savior'.

Greek ὡσαννά (hōsanná) transliterates Hebrew הוֹשִׁיעָה־נָּא (hôšîʿā-nnāʾ) “save, we pray” (Psalm 118:25); originally a plea for help that later became a liturgical acclamation."Hosanna". Encyclopaedia Britannica.

In the Hebrew Bible it is used only in verses such as "help" or "save, I pray" (Psalms 118:25). However, in the Gospels it is used as a shout of jubilation, and this has given rise to complex discussions. In that context, the word Hosanna seems to be a "special kind of respect" given to the one who saved, saves, is saving now or will save. If so Hosanna means "a special honor to the one who saves". The literal interpretation "Save, now!", based on Psalm 118:25, does not fully explain the occurrence of the word.

== Liturgical use in Judaism ==
In Jewish liturgy, the word is applied specifically to the Hoshana Service, a cycle of prayers from which a selection is sung each morning during Sukkot, the Feast of Booths or Tabernacles. The complete cycle is sung on the seventh day of the festival, which is called Hoshana Rabbah (הושענא רבה, "Great Hoshana"). In Judaism it is always used in its original Hebrew form, הושע נא Hosha na or הושענא Hoshana.

== Liturgical use in Christianity ==
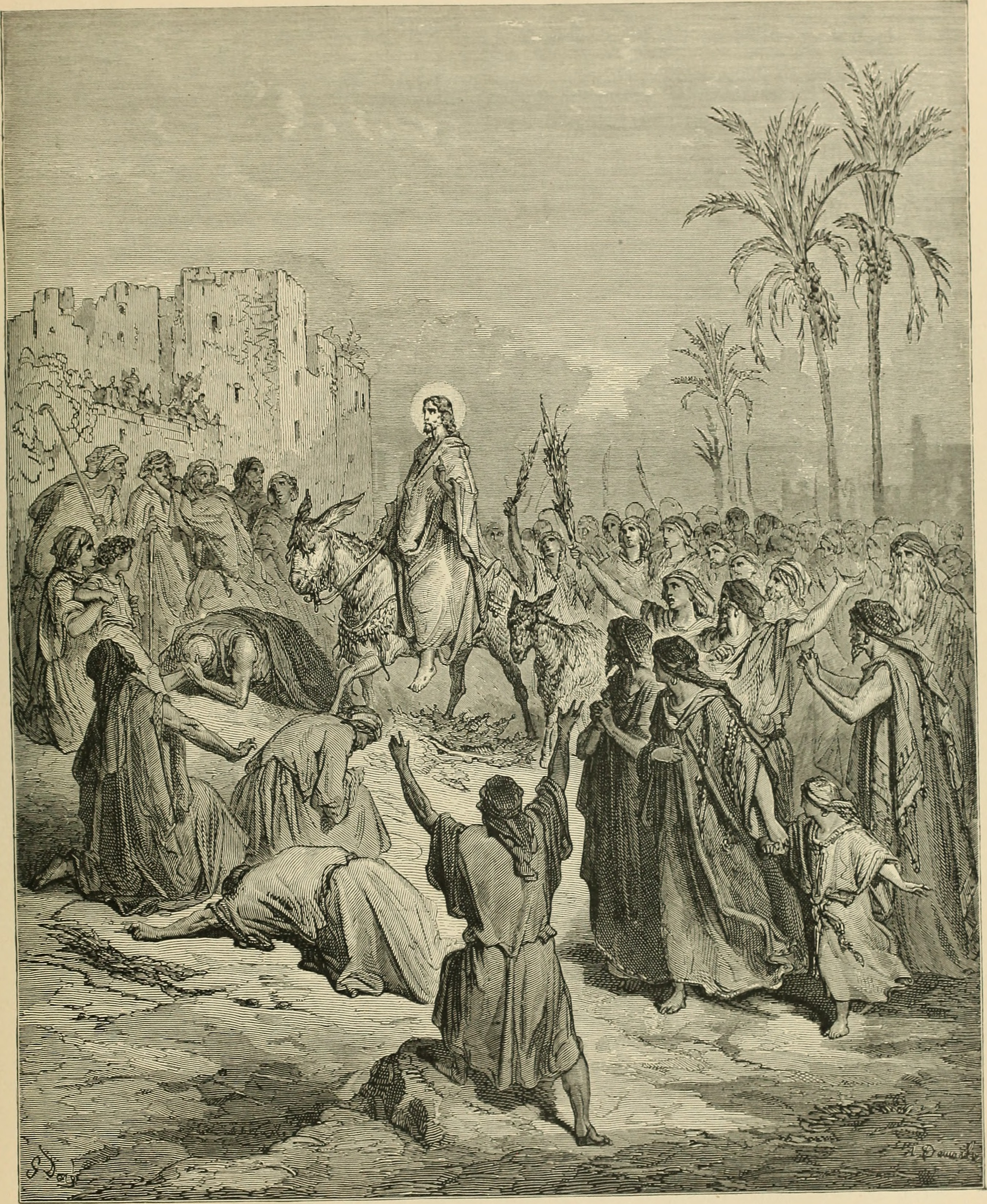
Crowds cry "Hosanna" during Jesus' entry into Jerusalem

=== Christian reinterpretation ===
Since Jesus and those welcoming him upon his entry into Jerusalem, some would interpret the cry of "Hosanna" in its proper meaning as a cry by the people for salvation and rescue. "Hosanna" many interpret as a shout of praise or adoration made in recognition of the messiahship of Jesus on his entry into Jerusalem.

It is applied in numerous verses of the New Testament, including "Hosanna! blessed is the one who comes in the name of the LORD!" (Matthew 21:9,15; Mark 11:9–10; John 12:13), which forms part of the Sanctus prayer; "hosanna in the highest" (Mark 11.10); and "hosanna to the Son of David" (Matt 21:9). These quotations, however, are of words in the Jewish Psalm 118. Although not used in the book of Luke, the testimony of Jesus's entry into Jerusalem is recorded in Luke 19.

=== In church music ===
The "Hosanna Anthem", based on the phrase Hosanna, is a traditional Moravian Church anthem written by Bishop Christian Gregor of Herrnhut sung on Palm Sunday and the first Sunday of Advent. It is antiphonal, i.e. a call-and-response song; traditionally, it is sung between the children and adult congregation, though it is not unheard of for it to be done in other ways, such as between choir and congregation, or played between trombone choirs.

Many songs for church use bear the title "Hosanna", including songs written by New Zealand singer Brooke Fraser Ligertwood (released on the 2007 Hillsong United albums All of the Above and live on Saviour King and covered by the Canadian group Starfield on their album I Will Go); another song by Paul Baloche on his 2006 album A Greater Song; another by gospel artist Kirk Franklin, and another by Andrew Peterson on his 2008 album Resurrection Letters II. Sidney Mohede's "Hosanna (Be Lifted High)" was included on Israel Houghton's 2011 Grammy Award-winning album Love God, Love People. "Hosanna! Loud Hosanna" is a well-known hymn by Jeanette Threlfall.

=== Osanahan ritual ===
In predominantly Catholic Philippines, particularly in Tagalog-speaking provinces, the term Osanahan refers to a procession of the faithful with the priest from a prayer station (sometimes termed kuból or Galilea) after the blessing of the palms to the local church for the remainder of the Palm Sunday liturgy. At each stop, children dressed as angels greet the priest or image of the Humenta (Christ mounted on a donkey), then chant the antiphon Hosanna filio David in Filipino or Latin, set to various traditional melodies played by a rondalla or brass band.

== Other examples of modern usage ==
The Latin phrase Gloria, Hosanna in excelsis! (meaning Glory! Hosanna in the highest!) features in the refrain of the 1924 Christmas carol "Ding Dong Merrily on High".

Architect Frank Lloyd Wright famously used the word in his exclamation "Hosanna! A client!" after securing a commission, breaking a long, dry spell.

In the 1969 Broadway musical 1776 the word is used repeatedly as part of the chorus of the song "Cool, Cool, Considerate Men".

"Hosanna" is the name of one of the songs in the 1971 rock opera Jesus Christ Superstar. The song covers the entry of Jesus into Jerusalem on Palm Sunday. The message that Jesus conveys in this sequence is "There is not one of you that cannot win the kingdom, / The slow, the suffering, the quick, the dead." The crowd's Hosannas become progressively tinged with foreboding ("Hey JC, JC, won't you smile for me/fight for me/die for me"). Their adoration is seen as a dangerous civil disturbance by the high priest Caiaphas, witnessing the event with members of the Sanhedrin and the Pharisees. ("Tell the rabble to be quiet/We anticipate a riot/This common crowd is much too loud."). There is also a reprise of the chorus when Jesus is sent to King Herod.

The German musical collective Popol Vuh used the phrase to title their 1972 album Hosianna Mantra.

A. R. Rahman composed the song "Hosanna" for the 2010 Tamil movie Vinnaithaandi Varuvaayaa. Here the word is used as an exclamation of joy when a man sees his beloved. The Catholic Secular Forum (CSF) objected to this song and asked film-makers Fox Star Studios to remove it from the final cut of the Hindi remake of the film, Ekk Deewana Tha.

Paul McCartney's album New, released in 2013, features a song titled "Hosanna". Contextually, he uses the phrase as a cry for help in light of the world's current state of affairs.

American comedians Tim & Eric use the phrase "blessed Hosanna" freely in their piece "Morning Prayer with Skott and Behr".

The Swedish Black Metal band Funeral Mist song "Hosanna" uses the cry with the opposite intent of its Christian origins, as the band typically does with biblical references.

David Gilmour references Hosanna in the song "A Single Spark" in his album, Luck and Strange, singing "Who will keep things rolling, who to sing Hosannas to".

The word features prominently in a single from The Decemberists' 2024 album, As It Ever Was, So It Will Be Again, "Joan in the Garden".

== See also ==
- Language of Jesus § Hosanna (Ὡσαννά)
- Hallelujah
- Hosanna shout – a Latter Day Saint practice

== Sources ==
- Yohannan Aharoni & Michael Avi-Yonah, The MacMillan Bible Atlas, Revised Edition, pp. 157–165 (1968 & 1977 by Carta Ltd).
