= Hosanna filio David =

Palm Sunday antiphon

Hosanna filio David

Hosanna filio David (Latin for "Hosanna to the Son of David") is a traditional antiphon sung during the Christian liturgy of Palm Sunday, specifically at the Blessing of Palms. This antiphon is part of the Roman Rite and is one of several chants associated with the commemoration of Jesus Christ's triumphal entry into Jerusalem, an event celebrated on Palm Sunday, the beginning of Holy Week in the Christian calendar. It is traditionally followed by the antiphon "Pueri Hebraeorum" (at the Distribution of Palms) and the hymn "Gloria laus" (during the Palm Sunday Procession), forming a sequence of liturgical music integral to the day's rites.

== Text and translation ==
The text of "Hosanna filio David" is derived from the Gospel accounts of Christ's entry into Jerusalem (e.g., Matthew 21:9), where the crowds greeted Him with shouts of "Hosanna." The antiphon is brief and jubilant, reflecting the exultation of the moment. The Latin text is as follows:

Hosanna filio David: benedictus qui venit in nomine Domini. Rex Israel: Hosanna in excelsis.

Translated to English, it reads:

"Hosanna to the Son of David: Blessed is He who comes in the name of the Lord. King of Israel: Hosanna in the highest."

The phrase "Son of David" underscores Jesus’ messianic identity, while "Hosanna" (originally a Hebrew cry for salvation, meaning "Save, we pray") had evolved by this time into an expression of praise.

== Liturgical Context ==
In the Roman Rite, "Hosanna filio David" is sung during the Blessing of Palms, and serves as an Introit or initial part of the Palm Sunday liturgy. This ritual involves the blessing of palm branches (or other local substitutes, such as olive branches), which are then distributed to the faithful. The antiphon sets a tone of triumph and adoration, recalling the biblical scene where Jesus was hailed as king by the crowds waving palm branches.

== Musical Setting ==
"Hosanna filio David" is traditionally performed in Gregorian chant, characterized by its monophonic melody and free rhythm. The chant is simple yet solemn, designed to enhance the liturgical action without overshadowing it. Scholars have noted the close relationship of this melody with the melody of the Seikilos epitaph, the oldest surviving piece of music, but where the long notes are resolved by groups of simple beats.

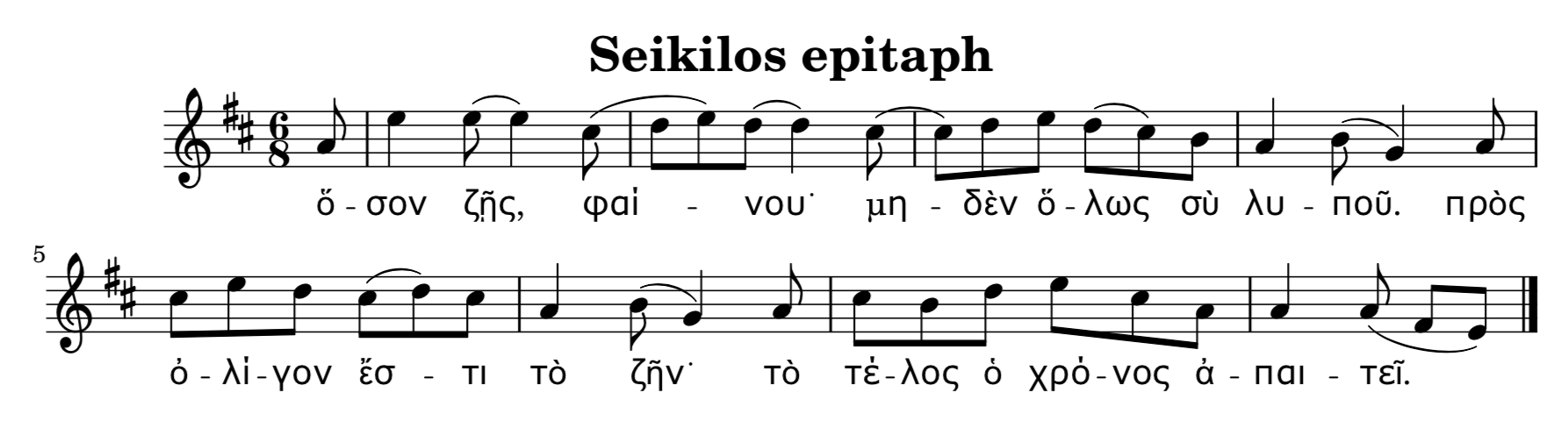
A variation of the Seikilos epitaph with barlines as suggested by Armand D'Angour (2018)

One explanation is the Greek melody gave rise to a citharodic variation, where this resolution of long values was the rule; preserved in the repertoire of instrumentalists, with its title alone, it was used by the centonisator of the Hosanna antiphon, to whom the rapprochement of Hoson and Hosanna will have given the idea of using the ancient theme. Its melody, preserved in medieval manuscripts such as the Graduale Romanum, reflects the jubilant yet reverent spirit of Palm Sunday. In modern celebrations, it may also be adapted into polyphonic settings or vernacular hymns, though the Latin chant remains a staple in traditional liturgies.

Schubert composed the Sechs Antiphonen zum Palmsonntag in 1820, a set of short choral works for mixed voices (SATB) intended for a cappella performance of which his first piece is the setting of Hosanna filio David in C major, which bridges the Gregorian chant tradition with Schubert's early Romantic harmonic language. More contemporary authors such as Jeanne Demessieux or Nicolas Flagello have also been inspired to put these lyrics to more modern music.

== Theological Significance ==
"Hosanna filio David" encapsulates the dual themes of Palm Sunday: triumph and impending sacrifice. The acclamation of Jesus as "Son of David" and "King of Israel" affirms His royal and messianic role, while the procession with palms foreshadows His Passion, as the same crowds would soon call for His crucifixion. The antiphon thus serves as both a celebration and a theological pivot into the events of Holy Week.

== Contemporary use ==
In the post-Vatican II liturgy, "Hosanna filio David" remains part of the Tridentine Mass (Extraordinary Form) and is optionally retained in the Ordinary Form when celebrated in Latin. In vernacular Masses, its themes are often echoed in hymns like "All Glory, Laud, and Honor" (an English adaptation of "Gloria laus"). The antiphon continues to resonate in Christian worship, symbolizing the faithful's recognition of Christ's kingship.

In the Philippines, especially parts where Tagalog is spoken, the Osanahan refers to an outdoors procession of palms involving the faithful and a priest, moving from a prayer station—locally called kuból or Galilea in some areas. It follows the blessing of palms to the local church for the rest of the Palm Sunday Mass. At each station along the route, children dressed as angels sing the Hosanna Filio David, in either Filipino or Latin, accompanied by traditional music from a rondalla or brass band before showering petals on the priest or image of Christ on a donkey.

== See also ==
- Palm Sunday
- Gregorian chant
- Pueri Hebraeorum
- Gloria laus
- Holy Week
