= Crucifixion in the Philippines =

Devotional practice in the Philippines

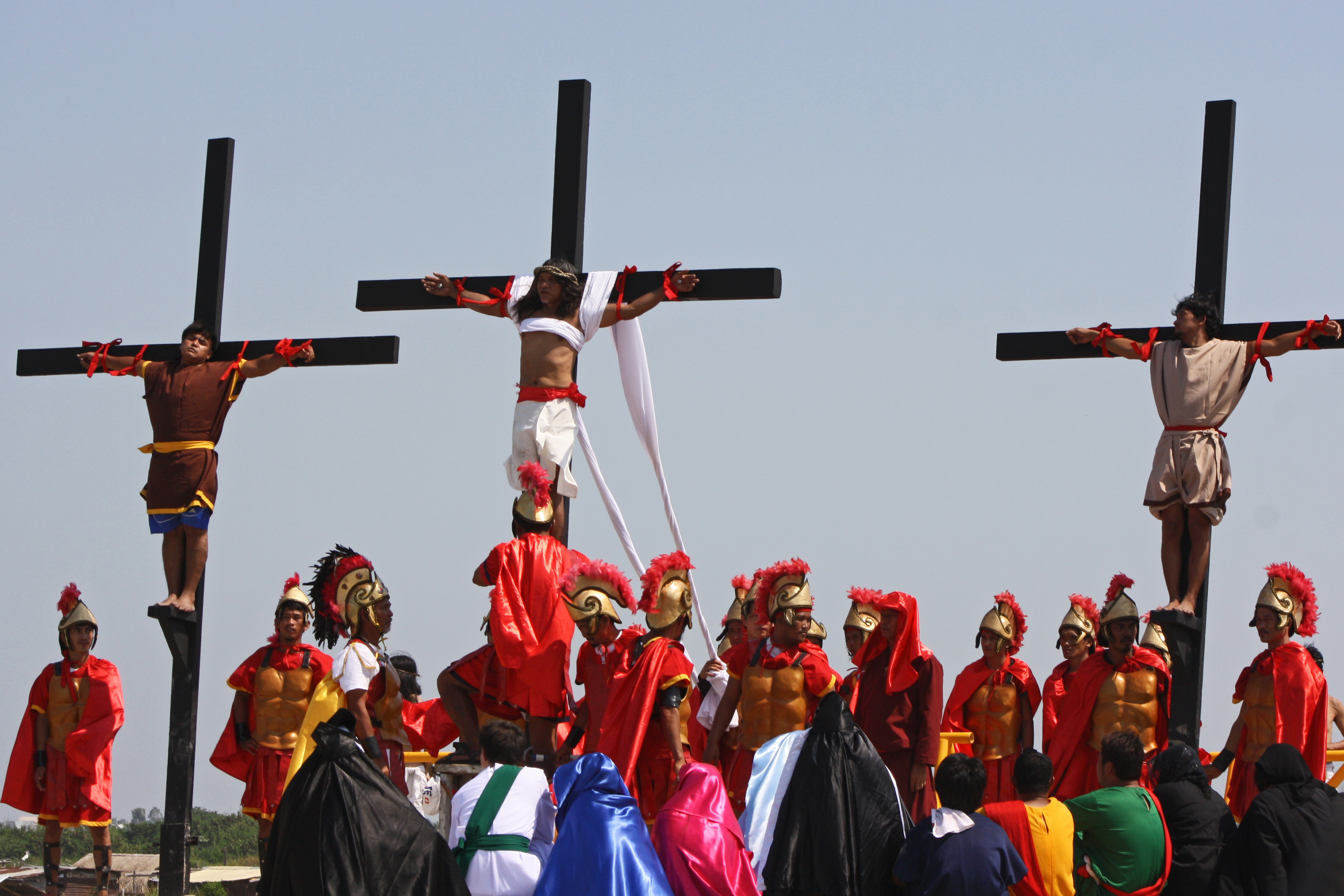
Good Friday observances in Barangay San Pedro Cutud, in San Fernando, Pampanga, Philippines.

Crucifixion in the Philippines is a devotional practice held every Good Friday in imitation of the Crucifixion of Jesus. As part of the local observance of Holy Week, devotees or penitents called magdarame in Kapampangan willingly have themselves crucified to reenact Jesus Christ's suffering and death, while related practices include carrying wooden crosses, crawling on rough pavement, and self-flagellation. Penitents consider these acts to be mortification of the flesh, and undertake these to ask forgiveness for sins, to fulfil a panatà (Filipino, "vow"), or to express gratitude for favours granted. In the most famous case, Ruben Enaje drives four-inch nails into both hands and feet and then he is lifted on a wooden cross for around five minutes.

== San Pedro Cutud, San Fernando ==
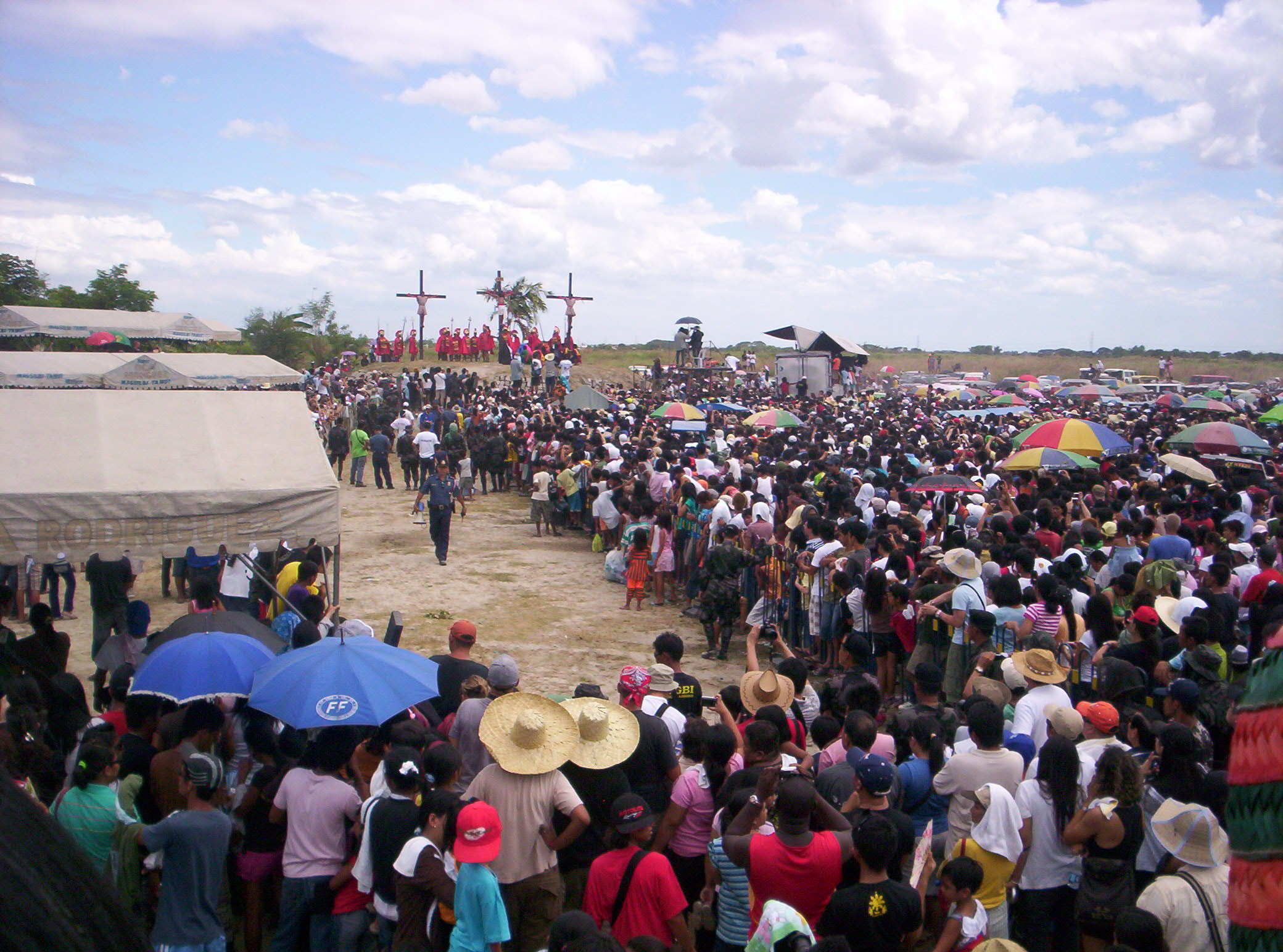
San Pedro Cutud Lenten Rites in the city of San Fernando, Pampanga. There are three crosses with nailed men on the top of the hill with spectators, both local and foreigners, watching them.

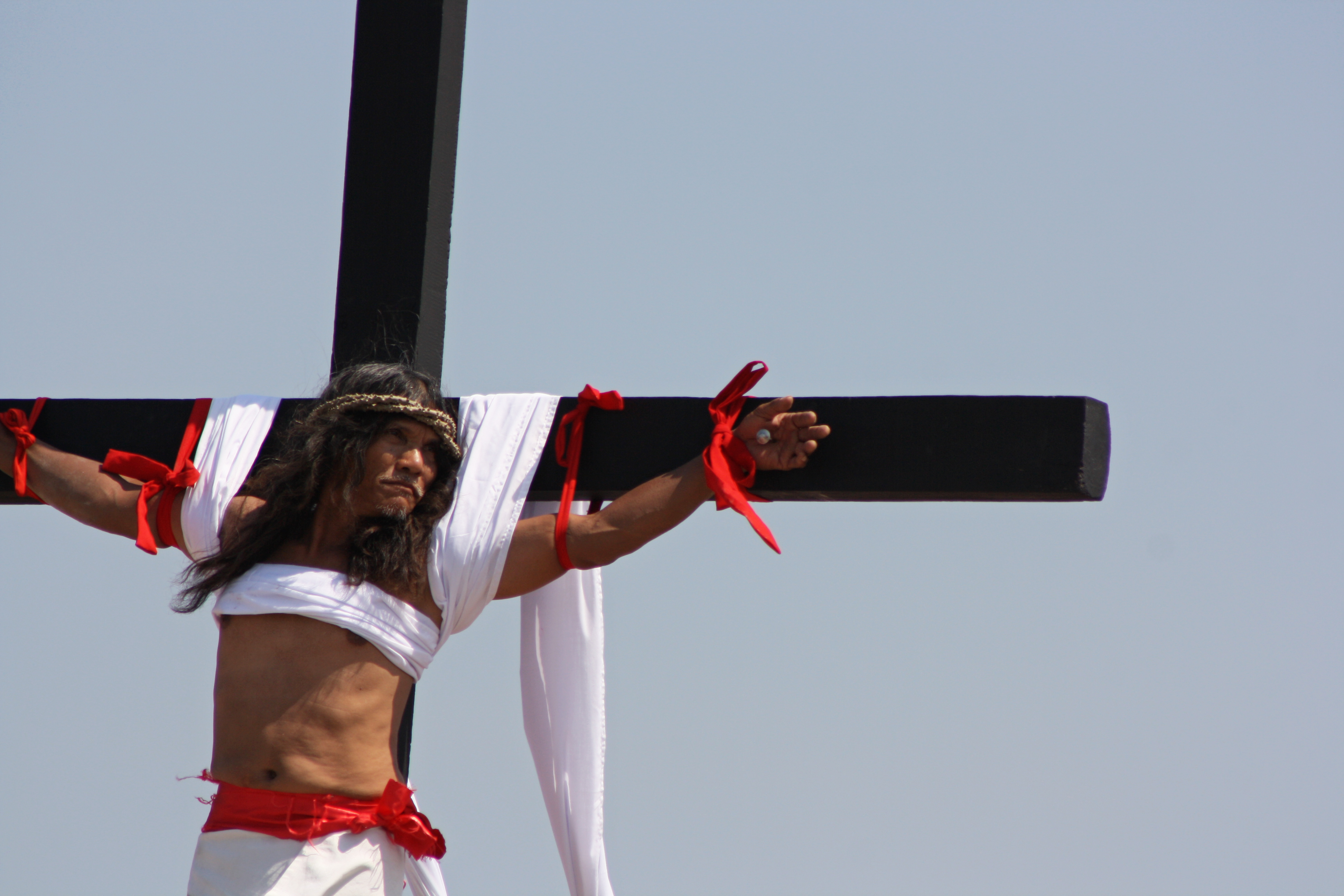
Ruben Enaje on his 25th annual crucifixion.

The San Pedro Cutud Lenten Rites are a re-enactment of Christ’s Passion and crucifixion held in Barangay San Pedro Cutud, San Fernando, Pampanga. It includes a passion play, culminating in the actual nailing of at least three penitents to wooden crosses atop a makeshift Calvary.

- Ruben Enaje has been crucified 37 times as of 2026. He began his yearly rite after surviving a fall from a three-story billboard in 1986. Other penitents crucified with Enaje on Good Friday 2013 were Angelito Mengillo; Arnold Meniego; Byron Gómez; Willy Salvador; Angelito Manansala; Jonny Manansala; Marben Unquico; Arnel Sanggalang; Victor Caparas; Rolando Ocampo; Orlando Valentin; Arnel Reyes; Rolando Baking; and four others.
- Ramíl Lázaro – a dishwasher, wheeler, and pedicab driver, was crucified along with five penitents on Good Friday at San Pedro Cutud, on Good Friday, April 6, 2012.
- Alex Laranang – 59, who claims to have been crucified every year since 2000.
- Arturo Bating – 44 (last 2012) had four-inch nails driven through his palms for the first time in Good Friday of 2012.

== Paombong, Bulacan ==
Crucifixions are also held in Barangay Kapitangan, Paombong, Bulacan which is a locally-known pilgrimage area and haven for faith healers. Many women have been nailed to the cross, acting on directions "from above", claiming mediumship of Christ either as the Santo Niño or the Black Nazarene.

- Precy Valencia – 41, one of a handful of women who are also crucified annually. Nailed to the cross on April 6, 2012.
- Rady Gonzáles – of Barangay Sto. Rosario, stayed nailed on the wooden cross for about 10 minutes as the crowd sang the Lord's Prayer.
- Buboy Dionisio – also of Barangay Sto. Rosario, nailed for the 16 consecutive years from 1997 to 2013. He claims receiving a vision of the Virgin Mary giving him three nails the first time he underwent crucifixion. He said that every year, he saw different visions which came before Holy Week.
- JonJon Tanael – of Barangay Bulihan, Malolos City, on April 6, 2012.
- Rolando Ocampo – 56, has been crucified every year since 1990 as a sign of his gratitude to God. He says God miraculously saved his wife from a difficult childbirth in that year. Ocampo prepares for his crucifixion for days in advance. He spends time alone and engages in deep meditation before the day on which he will share in Christ's suffering.
- John Safran (pseudonym John Michael) – a 37-year-old Australian media personality and author from Melbourne who wore a long wig and a tin crown of thorns on April 10, 2009.
- A 15-year-old boy and 18-year-old girl in 2008.

== Duljo-Fatima, Cebu City ==
- Gilbert Bargayo – crucified for the 15th time in Carcar, Cebu, and for the 17th time in Barangay Duljo-Fatima, Cebu City in 2012. Six-inch nails pierced his palms and feet, and took 45 minutes to all be hammered in.

== Angeles ==
The Siete Palabras (Seven Last Words) play in Angeles, Pampanga, depicts the sufferings of Christ from his sentencing by Pontius Pilate to his death. This takes the form of a colourful street play, with dozens of men carrying wooden crosses as heavy as 50 kg (110 pounds) and scores flagellating themselves in Barangay Lourdes Northwest, Angeles, between 14:00 and 15:00 PST (GMT+8).

== Reception ==
The Catholic Church in the Philippines opposes the practice of crucifixion and self-flagellation. The bishops see the practices as spiritual vanity, with the Archbishop of Lingayen–Dagupan, Socrates Villegas, encouraging the public in 2014 to show more "love for others" instead of exhibiting "extreme forms" of sacrifice. Likewise, the Bishop of Legazpi, Joel Baylon, emphasized that spiritual conversion, and not "public display of suffering", is more meaningful. A priest from the Catholic Bishops' Conference of the Philippines (CBCP) said in 2023 that the crucifixions, which devotees believe lead to the forgiveness of their sins, are contrary to the teachings of the Church. Bishops instead invited the public to observe the traditional Visita Iglesia (Seven Churches Visitation) and offering prayers at churches.

The Department of Health in 2019 warned about the health risks of such activities, as open wounds cause various infections and diseases like tetanus. Likewise, the department warned that self-flagellating under the heat of the sun may cause heat stroke and dehydration.

== See also ==
- Mungyeong crucifixion case

== Bibliography ==
- The Crucifixion of Jesus, Completely Revised and Expanded: A Forensic Inquiry by Frederick T. Zugibe / Hardcover: 352 pages, Publisher: M. Evans & Company; 2nd Edition (April 1, 2005) ISBN 978-1590770702
