= Crucifixion =

Method of execution/torture

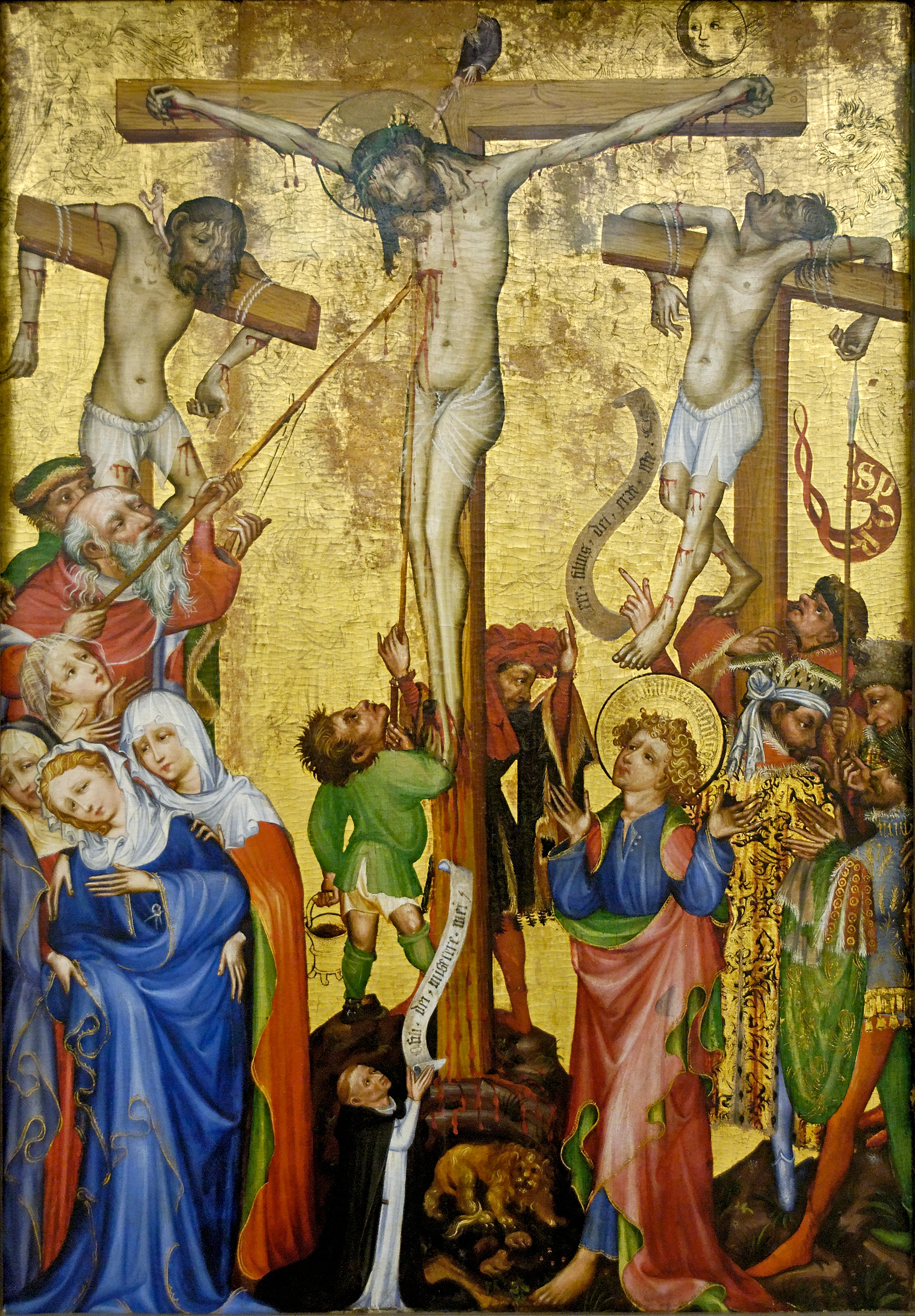
Depiction of Jesus Christ's crucifixion alongside the penitent thief and the impenitent thief. (Christian art, 15th-century Strasbourg)

Crucifixion is a method of capital punishment and torture in which the condemned is tied or nailed to a large wooden cross, beam, or stake, and usually left to hang until eventual death, which could take minutes to days. Although this process typically takes many days while coupled with starvation, the executioner may deliberately or inadvertently sever an artery of the crucified subject while nailing them to the cross, killing them within a matter of minutes due to rapid and large-scale blood loss. Crucifixion was common in the ancient world— Greece, Persia, Carthage, and Rome are among several civilizations that are known to have widely used this method to execute condemned individuals. In the 21st century, it remains a legally sanctioned punishment in some Muslim-majority countries and is also frequently recorded in other parts of the world in connection with cases of murder, war crimes, and genocide.

The Roman practice is the most prominent historical example due to the crucifixion of Jesus Christ, which became central to Christianity and is represented globally through the Christian cross and the crucifix. Other Christian figures are traditionally believed to have been subject to variations of the method, including Saint Peter, who is said to have been crucified upside-down; and Saint Andrew, who is said to have been crucified on an X-shaped cross. Today, Christians in some parts of the world voluntarily subject themselves to non-lethal crucifixions as a devotional practice, although these incidents have resulted in social and legal controversy as well as accidental deaths.

== Terminology ==
Ancient Greek has two verbs for crucify: anastauroo (ἀνασταυρόω), from stauros (which in modern Greek only means "cross" but which in antiquity was used for any kind of wooden pole, pointed or blunt, bare or with attachments) and apotumpanizo (ἀποτυμπανίζω) "crucify on a plank", together with anaskolopizo (ἀνασκολοπίζω "impale"). In earlier pre-Roman Greek texts anastauro usually means "impale".

The Greek used in the Christian New Testament uses four verbs, three of them based upon stauros (σταυρός), usually translated "cross". The most common term is stauroo (σταυρόω), "to crucify", occurring 46 times; sustauroo (συσταυρόω), "to crucify with" or "alongside" occurs five times, while anastauroo (ἀνασταυρόω), "to crucify again" occurs only once at the Epistle to the Hebrews 6:6. Prospegnumi (προσπήγνυμι), "to fix or fasten to, impale, crucify" occurs only once, at the Acts of the Apostles 2:23.

The English term cross derives from the Latin word crux, which classically referred to a tree or any construction of wood used to hang criminals as a form of execution. The term later came to refer specifically to a cross. The related term crucifix derives from the Latin crucifixus or cruci fixus, past participle passive of crucifigere or cruci figere, meaning "to crucify" or "to fasten to a cross".

== Detail ==
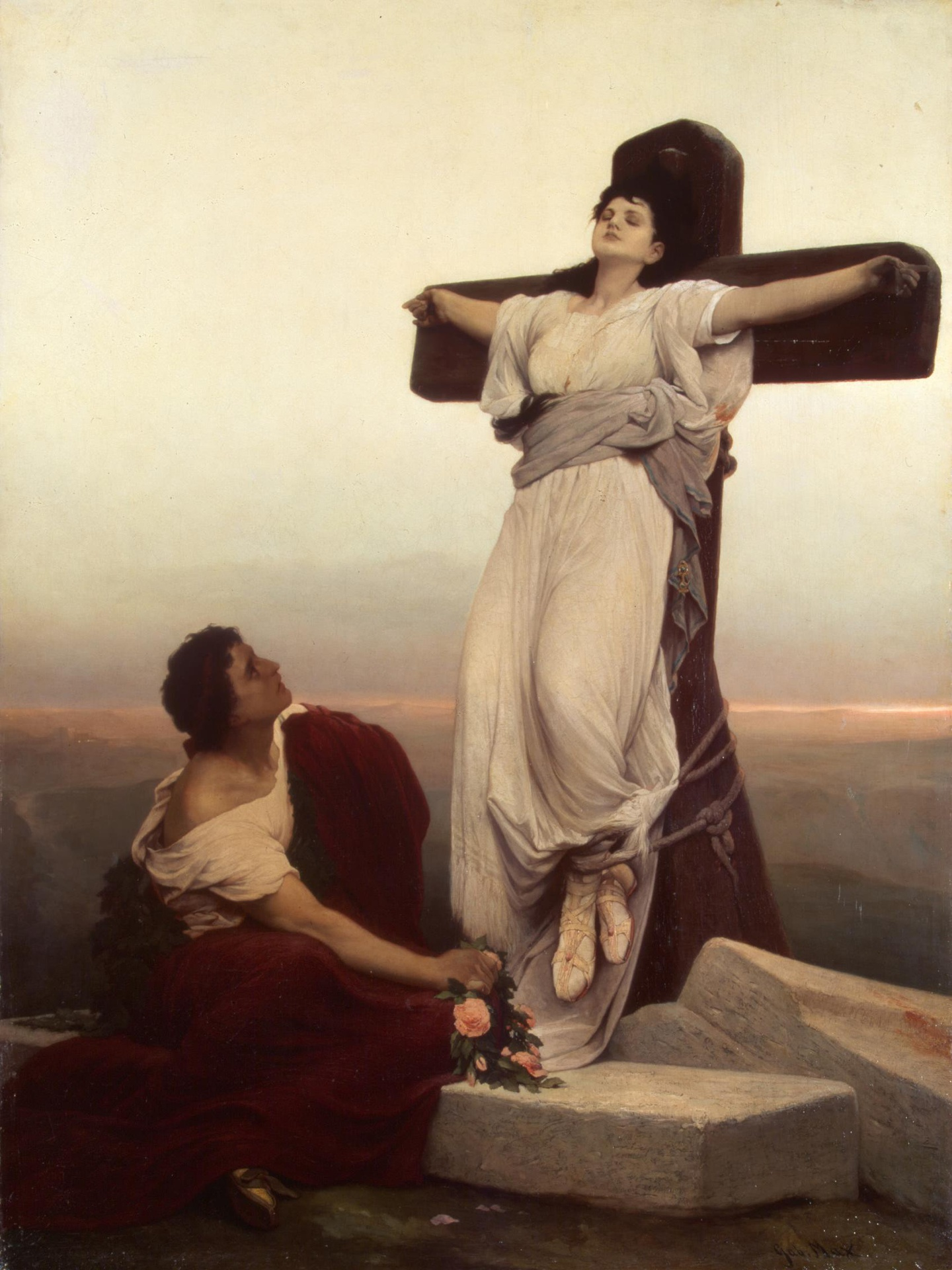
Gabriel von Max's 1866 painting Martyress depicts a crucified young woman and a young man laying flowers at her feet

=== Cross shape ===
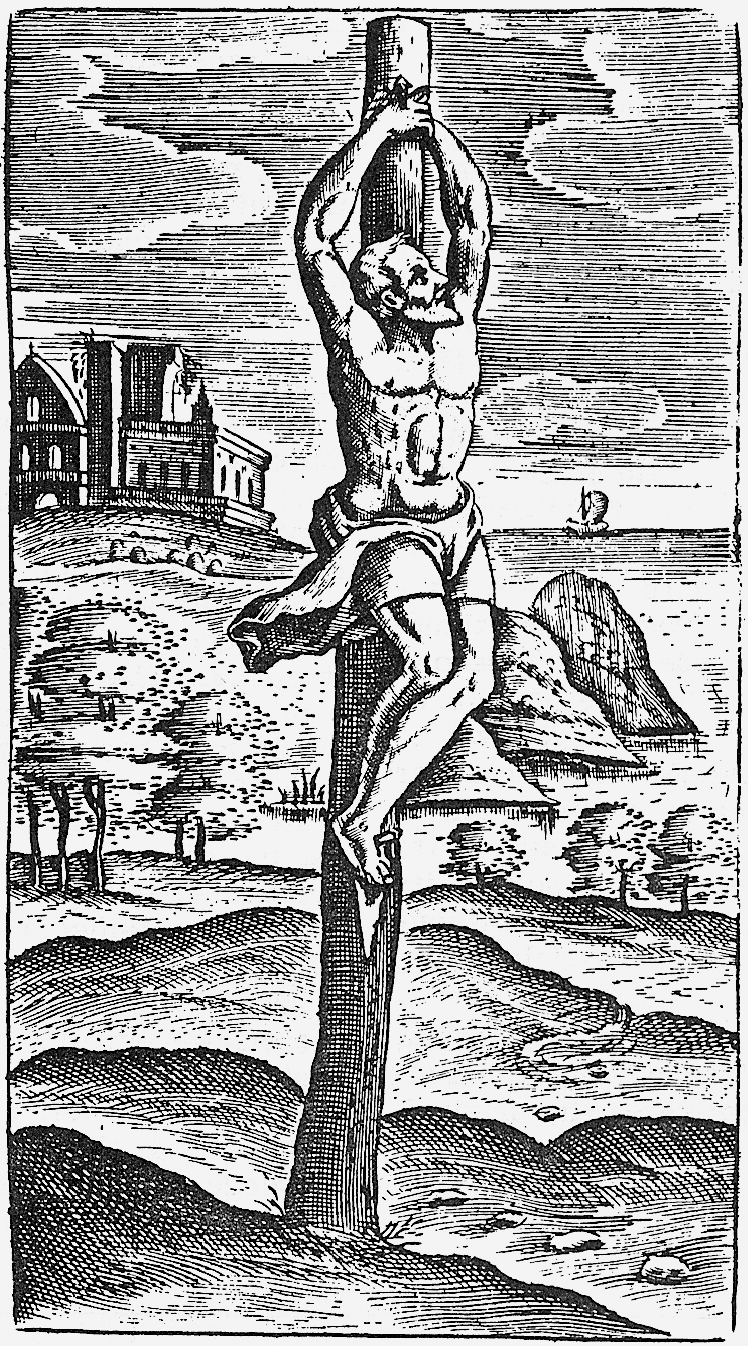
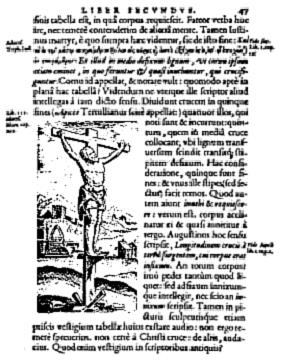
Two illustrations from editions of a book by Justus Lipsius (1547–1606): on left, a crux simplex (1629 edition, p. 19); on right, crucifixion of Jesus (1593 edition, p. 47).

In the Roman Empire, the gibbet (instrument of execution) for crucifixions took on many shapes. Seneca the Younger (c. 4 BCE–65 CE) states: "I see crosses there, not just of one kind but made in many different ways: some have their victims with head down to the ground; some impale their private parts; others stretch out their arms on the gibbet." According to Josephus, during Emperor Titus's Siege of Jerusalem, Roman soldiers nailed innumerable Jewish captives to crosses in various ways.

At times the gibbet was a simple vertical stake, called in Latin crux simplex. Frequently, however, there was a cross-piece attached either at the top to give the shape of a T (crux commissa) or just below the top, as in the form most familiar in Christian symbolism (crux immissa). The most ancient image of a Roman crucifixion depicts an individual on a T-shaped cross. It is a graffito found in a taberna (hostel for wayfarers) in Puteoli, dating to the time of Trajan or Hadrian (late 1st century to early 2nd century CE).

Writers in the 2nd century who speak of the execution cross describe the crucified person's arms as outstretched, not attached to a single stake: Lucian speaks of Prometheus as crucified "above the ravine with his hands outstretched". He also says that the shape of the letter Τ (the Greek letter tau) was that of the wooden instrument used for crucifying. Artemidorus, another writer of the same period, says that a cross is made of posts (plural) and nails and that the arms of the crucified are outstretched. Speaking of the generic execution cross, Irenaeus (c. 130–202), a Christian writer, describes it as composed of an upright and a transverse beam, sometimes with a small projection in the upright.

New Testament writings about the crucifixion of Jesus do not specify the shape of that cross, but subsequent early writings liken it to the letter T. According to William Barclay, because tau is shaped exactly like the crux commissa and represented the number 300, "wherever the fathers came across the number 300 in the Old Testament they took it to be a mystical prefiguring of the cross of Christ". The earliest example, written around the late 1st century, is the Epistle of Barnabas, with another example being Clement of Alexandria (c. 150 – c. 215).

Justin Martyr (c. 100 – c. 165) sees the cross of Christ represented in the crossed spits used to roast the Passover lamb.

=== Nail placement ===
In popular depictions of the crucifixion of Jesus (possibly because in translations of John 20:25 the wounds are described as being "in his hands"), Jesus is shown with nails in his hands. But in Greek the word "χείρ", usually translated as "hand", could refer to the entire portion of the arm below the elbow, and to denote the hand as distinct from the arm some other word could be added, as "ἄκρην οὔτασε χεῖρα" (he wounded the end of the χείρ, i.e., "he wounded him in the hand".

A possibility that does not require tying is that the nails were inserted just above the wrist, through the soft tissue, between the two bones of the forearm (the radius and the ulna).

A foot-rest (suppedaneum) attached to the cross, perhaps for the purpose of taking the person's weight off the wrists, is sometimes included in representations of the crucifixion of Jesus but is not discussed in ancient sources. Some scholars interpret the Alexamenos graffito (c. 200), the earliest surviving depiction of the crucifixion, as including such a foot-rest. Ancient sources also mention the sedile, a small seat attached to the front of the cross, about halfway down, which could have served a similar purpose.

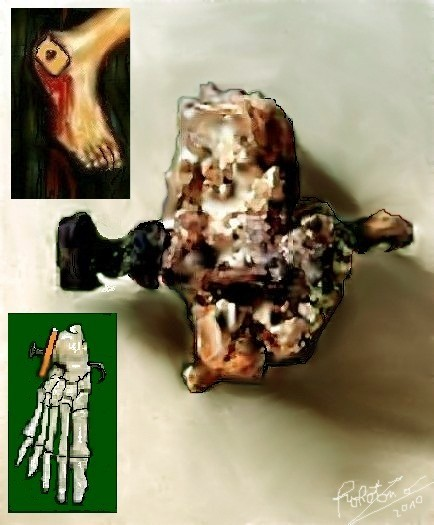
1st century calcaneum (heel bone) with a nail

In 1968, archaeologists discovered at Giv'at ha-Mivtar in northeast Jerusalem the remains of one Jehohanan, who was crucified in the 1st century CE. The remains included a heel bone with a nail driven through it from the side. The tip of the nail was bent, perhaps because of striking a knot in the upright beam, which prevented it being extracted from the foot. A first inaccurate account of the length of the nail led some to believe that it had been driven through both heels, suggesting that the man had been placed in a sort of sidesaddle position, but the true length of the nail, 11.5 centimetres (4 1/2 inches), suggests instead that in this case of crucifixion the heels were nailed to opposite sides of the upright beam. As of 2011, the skeleton from Giv'at ha-Mivtar was the only confirmed example of ancient crucifixion in the archaeological record. A second set of skeletal remains with holes transverse through the calcaneum heel bones, found in 2007, could be a second archaeological record of crucifixion. The find in Cambridgeshire (United Kingdom) in November 2017 of the remains of the heel bone of a (probably enslaved) man with an iron nail through it, is believed by the archeologists to confirm the use of this method in ancient Rome.

=== Cause of death ===
The length of time required to reach death could range from hours to days depending on method, the victim's health, and the environment. If a nail severed an artery, death could occur within minutes. Some Roman crucifiers are reported to have taken bribes to sever an artery for a quick death.

A theory attributed to Pierre Barbet held that, when the whole body weight was supported by the stretched arms, the typical cause of death was asphyxiation. He wrote that the condemned would have severe difficulty inhaling, due to hyper-expansion of the chest muscles and lungs. The condemned would therefore have to draw himself up by the arms, leading to exhaustion, or have his feet supported by tying or by a wood block. When no longer able to lift himself, the condemned would die within a few minutes. This theory has been supported by multiple scholars. Other scholars, including Frederick Zugibe, posit other causes of death. Zugibe suspended test subjects with their arms at 60° to 70° from the vertical. The test subjects had no difficulty breathing during experiments, but did suffer rapidly increasing pain, which is consistent with the Roman use of crucifixion to achieve a prolonged, agonizing death. However, Zugibe's positioning of the test subjects necessarily did not precisely replicate the conditions of historical crucifixion. In 2023, an analysis of medical literature concluded that asphyxiation is discredited as the primary cause of death from crucifixion.

There is scholarly support for several possible non-asphyxiation causes of death: heart failure or arrhythmia, hypovolemic shock, acidosis, dehydration, and pulmonary embolism. Death could result from any combination of those factors, or from other causes, including sepsis following infection due to the wounds caused by the nails or by the scourging that often preceded crucifixion, or from stabbing by the guards.

=== Survival ===
Since death does not follow immediately on crucifixion, survival after a short period of crucifixion is possible, as in the case of those who choose each year as a devotional practice to be non-lethally crucified.

There is an ancient record of one person who survived a crucifixion that was intended to be lethal, but was interrupted. Josephus recounts:

"I saw many captives crucified, and remembered three of them as my former acquaintances. I was very sorry at this in my mind, and went with tears in my eyes to Titus, and told him of them; so he immediately commanded them to be taken down, and to have the greatest care taken of them, in order to their recovery; yet two of them died under the physician's hands, while the third recovered."

Josephus gives no details of the method or duration of the crucifixion of his three friends.

== History ==
=== Pre-Roman states ===
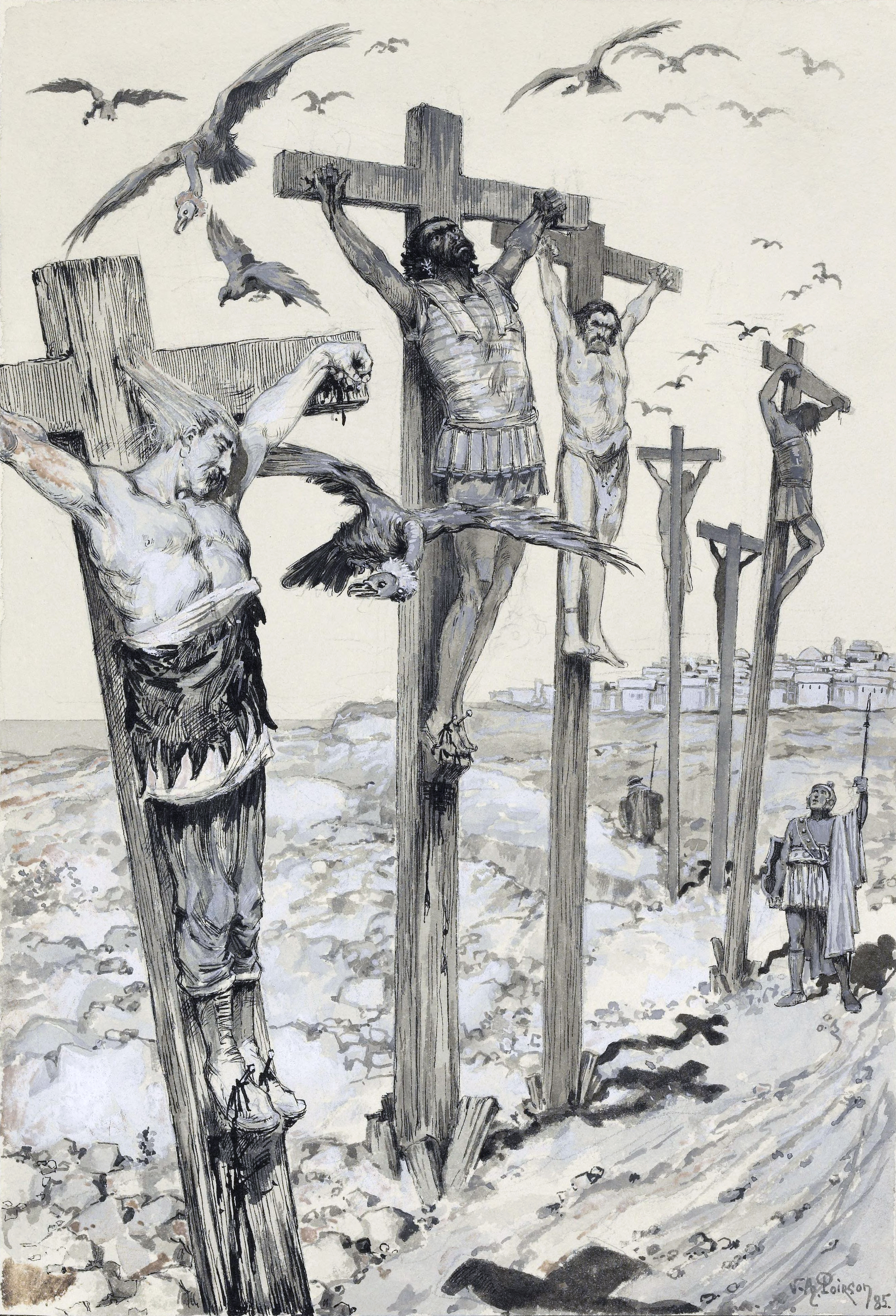
A 19th century depiction of the crucifixion of Spendius and other rebel leaders by the Carthaginians after the Battle of the Saw in 238 BCE

The earliest section of the Book of Deuteronomy is widely believed to have been composed in Jerusalem in the 7th century BCE. Beginning with Paul the Apostle (writing in Galatians 3:13), some authors have interpreted the text in Deuteronomy 21:22–23 as an allusion to crucifixion. This reference is to hanging the corpse of an executed criminal on a tree, possibly as a form of deterrence.

The earliest clear reference to crucifixion may be a post-mortem one mentioned by Herodotus in the third book of his Histories. Polycrates, the tyrant of Samos, was executed in 522 BCE by Oroetus (satrap of Lydia), and his dead body was then crucified.

In his Histories, Herodotus describes the execution of a Persian general at the hands of the Athenians during the second Persian invasion of Greece in about 479 BCE: "They nailed him to a plank and hung him up ... this Artayctes who suffered death by crucifixion." The Commentary on Herodotus by How and Wells remarks: "They crucified him with hands and feet stretched out and nailed to cross-pieces; cf. vii.33. This act, supposedly unusual on the part of Greeks, may be explained by the enormity of the outrage or by Athenian deference to local feeling."

In 332 BCE, Alexander the Great is reputed to have crucified 2,000 survivors from his siege of the Phoenician city of Tyre, as well as the doctor who unsuccessfully treated Alexander's lifelong friend Hephaestion. Some historians have also conjectured that Alexander crucified Callisthenes, his official historian and biographer, for objecting to Alexander's adoption of the Persian ceremony of royal adoration.

In Ancient Carthage, crucifixion was known to be imposed on generals for suffering a major defeat. In 238 BCE, during the Battle of the Saw, rebel leaders (including Spendius and Hannibal) were crucified by the Carthaginians. In 202 BCE, the Carthaginian general Hannibal who had suffered defeat in several battles of the Second Punic War disembarked at the Roman-controlled city of Leptis Parva in hopes of avoiding crucifixion.

In 87 BCE, after the Judean Civil War, Alexander Jannaeus was reported to have crucified 800 rebels in Jerusalem.

=== Ancient Rome ===
The Greek and Latin words corresponding to "crucifixion" applied to many different forms of painful execution, including being impaled on a stake, or affixed to a tree, upright pole (a crux simplex), or to a combination of an upright (in Latin, stipes) and a crossbeam (in Latin, patibulum). Seneca the Younger wrote: "I see crosses there, not just of one kind but made in many different ways: some have their victims with head down to the ground; some impale their private parts; others stretch out their arms on the gibbet".

Crucifixion was generally performed within Ancient Rome as a means to dissuade others from perpetrating similar crimes, with victims sometimes left on display after death as a warning. Crucifixion was intended to provide a death that was particularly slow, painful (hence the term excruciating, literally "out of crucifying"), gruesome, humiliating, and public, using whatever means were most expedient for that goal. Crucifixion methods varied considerably with location and period.

One hypothesis suggested that the Ancient Roman custom of crucifixion may have developed out of a primitive custom of arbori suspendere—hanging on an arbor infelix ("inauspicious tree") dedicated to the gods of the nether world. This hypothesis is rejected by William A. Oldfather, who shows that this form of execution (the supplicium more maiorum, punishment in accordance with the custom of our ancestors) consisted of suspending someone from a tree, not dedicated to any particular gods, and flogging him to death. Tertullian mentions a 1st-century CE case in which trees were used for crucifixion, but Seneca the Younger earlier used the phrase infelix lignum (unfortunate wood) for the transom ("patibulum") or the whole cross. Plautus and Plutarch are the two main sources for accounts of criminals carrying their own patibula to the upright stipes.

Mass crucifixions followed the Third Servile War in 73–71 BCE (the slave rebellion led by Spartacus), and other Roman civil wars in the 2nd and 1st centuries BCE. Crassus ordered the crucifixion of 6,000 of Spartacus' followers who had been hunted down and captured after the slaves were defeated in battle. Josephus says that in the siege that led to the destruction of Jerusalem in CE 70, the Roman soldiers crucified Jewish captives before the walls of Jerusalem and out of anger and hatred amused themselves by nailing them in different positions.

In some cases, the condemned were forced to carry the crossbeam to the place of execution. A whole cross would weigh well over 135 kg (300 lb), but the crossbeam would not be as burdensome, weighing around 45 kg (100 lb). The Roman historian Tacitus records that the city of Rome had a specific place for carrying out executions, situated outside the Esquiline Gate, and had a specific area reserved for the execution of slaves by crucifixion. Upright posts would presumably be fixed permanently in that place, and the crossbeam, with the condemned person perhaps already nailed to it, would then be attached to the post.

The person executed may have been attached to the cross by rope, though nails and other sharp materials are mentioned in a passage by Josephus, where he states that at the Siege of Jerusalem (70 CE), "the soldiers out of rage and hatred, nailed those they caught, one after one way, and another after another, to the crosses, by way of jest". Objects used in the crucifixion of criminals, such as nails, were sought as amulets with perceived medicinal qualities.

While a crucifixion was an execution, it was also a humiliation, by making the condemned as vulnerable as possible. Although artists have traditionally depicted the figure on a cross with a loin cloth or a covering of the genitals, the person being crucified was usually stripped naked. Writings by Seneca the Younger state some victims suffered a stick forced upwards through their groin. Despite its frequent use by the Romans, the horrors of crucifixion did not escape criticism by some eminent Roman orators. Cicero, for example, described crucifixion as "a most cruel and disgusting punishment", and suggested that "the very mention of the cross should be far removed not only from a Roman citizen's body, but from his mind, his eyes, his ears". Elsewhere he says, "It is a crime to bind a Roman citizen; to scourge him is a wickedness; to put him to death is almost parricide. What shall I say of crucifying him? So guilty an action cannot by any possibility be adequately expressed by any name bad enough for it."

Frequently, the legs of the person executed were broken or shattered with an iron club, an act called crurifragium, which was also frequently applied without crucifixion to slaves. This act hastened the death of the person but was also meant to deter those who observed the crucifixion from committing offenses.

Constantine the Great, the first Christian emperor, abolished crucifixion in the Roman Empire in 337 out of veneration for Jesus Christ, its most famous victim.

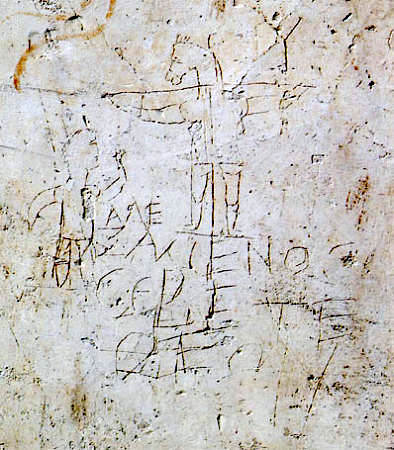
The Alexamenos graffito, a satirical representation of the Christian worship, depicting a man worshiping a crucified donkey (Rome, c. 85 CE to 3rd century). It is inscribed ΑΛΕΞΑΜΕΝΟΣ (ΑΛΕΞΑΜΕΝΟϹ) ΣΕΒΕΤΕ (ϹΕΒΕΤΕ) ΘΕΟΝ, which translates as "Alexamenos worships his god". Visible at the museum on the Palatine Hill, Rome, Italy (left). A modern-day tracing (right).

Crucifixion was intended to be a gruesome spectacle: the most painful and humiliating death imaginable. It was used to punish slaves, pirates, and enemies of the state. It was originally reserved for slaves (hence still called "supplicium servile" by Seneca), and later extended to citizens of the lower classes (humiliores). The victims of crucifixion were stripped naked and put on public display while they were slowly tortured to death so that they would serve as a spectacle and an example.

According to Roman law, if a slave killed their owner, all of the owner's slaves would be crucified as punishment. Both men and women were crucified. Tacitus writes in his Annals that when Lucius Pedanius Secundus was murdered by a slave, some in the Senate tried to prevent the mass crucifixion of four hundred of his slaves because there were so many women and children, but in the end tradition prevailed and they were all executed. Although not conclusive evidence for female crucifixion by itself, the most ancient image of a Roman crucifixion may depict a crucified woman, whether real or imaginary. (Note: It is a graffito found in a taberna (hostel for wayfarers) in Puteoli, dating to the time of Trajan or Hadrian (late 1st century to early 2nd century CE). An inscription over the person's left shoulder reads "Ἀλκίμιλα" (Alkimila), a female name. It is not clear, however, whether the inscription was written by the same person who drew the picture, or added by another person later. It is also not known whether the graffito is intended to depict an actual event, as distinguished from, perhaps, the writer's desire for someone to be crucified, or as a jest. As such, the graffito does not itself provide conclusive evidence of female crucifixion.) Crucifixion was such a gruesome and humiliating way to die that the subject was somewhat of a taboo in Roman culture, and few crucifixions were specifically documented. One of the only specific female crucifixions that are documented is that of Ida, a freedwoman (former slave) who was crucified by order of Tiberius.

Crucifixion was typically carried out by specialized teams, consisting of a commanding centurion and his soldiers. First, the condemned would be stripped naked and scourged. This would cause the person to lose a large amount of blood, and approach a state of shock. The convict then usually had to carry the horizontal beam (patibulum in Latin) to the place of execution, but not necessarily the whole cross.

During the death march, the prisoner, probably still nude after the scourging, would be led through the most crowded streets bearing a titulus – a sign board proclaiming the prisoner's name and crime. Upon arrival at the place of execution, selected to be especially public, the convict would be stripped of any remaining clothing, then nailed to the cross naked. If the crucifixion took place in an established place of execution, the vertical beam (stipes) might be permanently embedded in the ground. In this case, the condemned person's wrists would first be nailed to the patibulum, and then he or she would be hoisted off the ground with ropes to hang from the elevated patibulum while it was fastened to the stipes. Next the feet or ankles would be nailed to the upright stake. The 'nails' were tapered iron spikes approximately 13 to 18 cm (5 to 7 in) long, with a square shaft 10 millimetres (3/8 in) across. The titulus would also be fastened to the cross to notify onlookers of the person's name and crime as they hung on the cross, further maximizing the public impact.

Crucifixion nail from the Via Appia with bone fragment

There may have been considerable variation in the position in which prisoners were nailed to their crosses and how their bodies were supported while they died. Seneca the Younger recounts: "I see crosses there, not just of one kind but made in many different ways: some have their victims with head down to the ground; some impale their private parts; others stretch out their arms on the gibbet." One source claims that for Jews (apparently not for others), a man would be crucified with his back to the cross as is traditionally depicted, while a woman would be nailed facing her cross, probably with her back to onlookers, or at least with the stipes providing some semblance of modesty if viewed from the front. Such concessions were "unique" and not made outside a Jewish context. Several sources mention some sort of seat fastened to the stipes to help support the person's body, thereby prolonging the person's suffering and humiliation. Justin Martyr calls the seat a cornu, or "horn," leading some scholars to believe it may have had a pointed shape designed to torment the crucified person. This would be consistent with Seneca's observation of victims with their private parts impaled.

In Roman-style crucifixion, the condemned could take up to a few days to die, but death was sometimes hastened by human action. "The attending Roman guards could leave the site only after the victim had died, and were known to precipitate death by means of deliberate fracturing of the tibia and/or fibula, spear stab wounds into the heart, sharp blows to the front of the chest, or a smoking fire built at the foot of the cross to asphyxiate the victim." The Romans sometimes broke the prisoner's legs to hasten death and usually forbade burial. On the other hand, the person was often deliberately kept alive as long as possible to prolong their suffering and humiliation, so as to provide the maximum deterrent effect. Corpses of the crucified were typically left on the crosses to decompose and be eaten by animals.

=== Islam ===
Islam spread in a region where many societies, including the Persian and Roman empires, had used crucifixion to punish traitors, rebels, robbers and criminal slaves. The Qur'an refers to crucifixion in six passages, of which the most significant for later legal developments is verse 5:33:

The punishment of those who wage war against Allah and His Apostle, and strive with might and main for mischief through the land is: execution, or crucifixion, or the cutting off of hands and feet from opposite sides, or exile from the land: that is their disgrace in this world, and a heavy punishment is theirs in the Hereafter.

The corpus of hadith provides contradictory statements about the first use of crucifixion under Islamic rule, attributing it variously to Muhammad himself (for murder and robbery of a shepherd) or to the second caliph Umar (applied to two slaves who murdered their mistress). Classical Islamic jurisprudence applies the verse 5:33 chiefly to highway robbers, as a hadd (scripturally prescribed) punishment. The preference for crucifixion over the other punishments mentioned in the verse or for their combination (which Sadakat Kadri has called "Islam's equivalent of the hanging, drawing and quartering that medieval Europeans inflicted on traitors") is subject to "complex and contested rules" in classical jurisprudence. Most scholars required crucifixion for highway robbery combined with murder, while others allowed execution by other methods for this scenario. The main methods of crucifixion are:

- Exposure of the culprit's body after execution by another method, ascribed to "most scholars" and in particular to Ibn Hanbal and Al-Shafi'i; or Hanbalis and Shafi'is.
- Crucifying the culprit alive, then executing him with a lance thrust or another method, ascribed to Malikis, most Hanafis and most Twelver Shi'is; the majority of the Malikis; Malik, Abu Hanifa, and al-Awza'i; or Malikis, Hanafis, and Shafi'is.
- Crucifying the culprit alive and sparing his life if he survives for three days, ascribed to Shiites.

Most classical jurists limit the period of crucifixion to three days. Crucifixion involves tying the body to a beam or a tree trunk, rather than nailing in standard crucifixion. Various minority opinions also prescribed crucifixion as punishment for a number of other crimes. Cases of crucifixion under most of the legally prescribed categories have been recorded in the history of Islam, and prolonged exposure of crucified bodies was especially common for political and religious opponents.

=== Japan ===
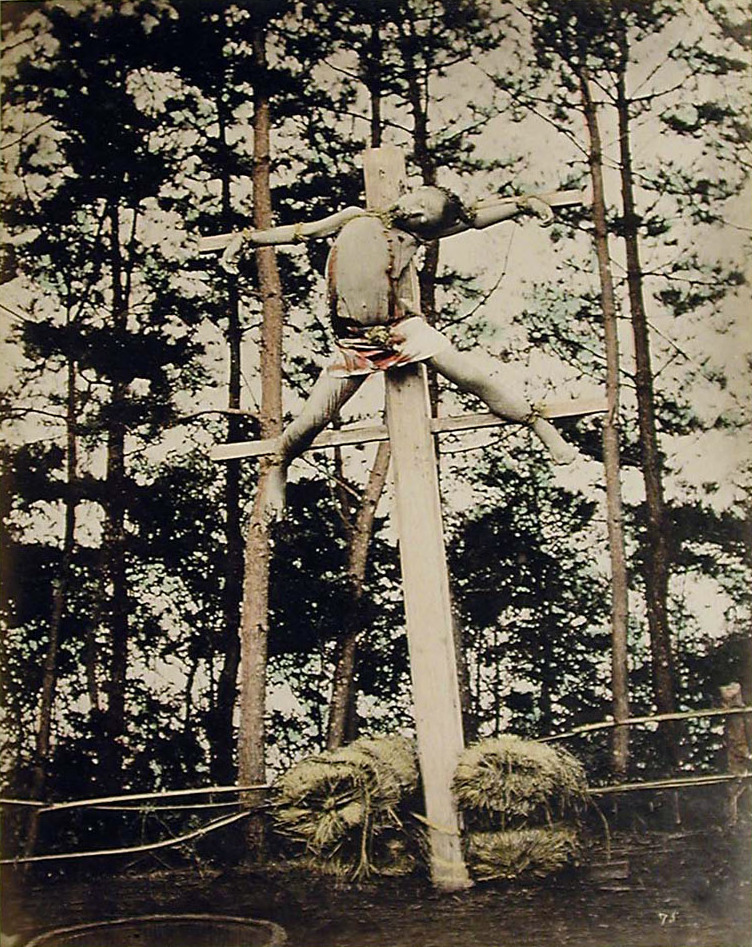
Early Meiji period crucifixion (c. 1865–1868), Yokohama, Japan. A 25-year-old servant, Sokichi, was executed by crucifixion for murdering his employer's son during the course of a robbery. He was affixed by tying to a stake with two cross-pieces.

Crucifixion was introduced into Japan during the Sengoku period (1467–1573), after a 350-year period with no capital punishment. It is believed to have been suggested to the Japanese by the introduction of Christianity into the region, although similar types of punishment had been used as early as the Kamakura period. Known in Japanese as haritsuke (磔), crucifixion was used in Japan before and during the Tokugawa Shogunate. Several related crucifixion techniques were used. Petra Schmidt, in "Capital Punishment in Japan", writes:

Execution by crucifixion included, first of all, hikimawashi (i.e, being paraded about town on horseback); then the unfortunate was tied to a cross made from one vertical and two horizontal poles. The cross was raised, the convict speared several times from two sides, and eventually killed with a final thrust through the throat. The corpse was left on the cross for three days. If one condemned to crucifixion died in prison, his body was pickled and the punishment executed on the dead body. Under Toyotomi Hideyoshi, one of the great 16th-century unifiers, crucifixion upside down (i.e, sakasaharitsuke) was frequently used. Water crucifixion (mizuharitsuke) awaited mostly Christians: a cross was raised at low tide; when the high tide came, the convict was submerged under water up to the head, prolonging death for many days

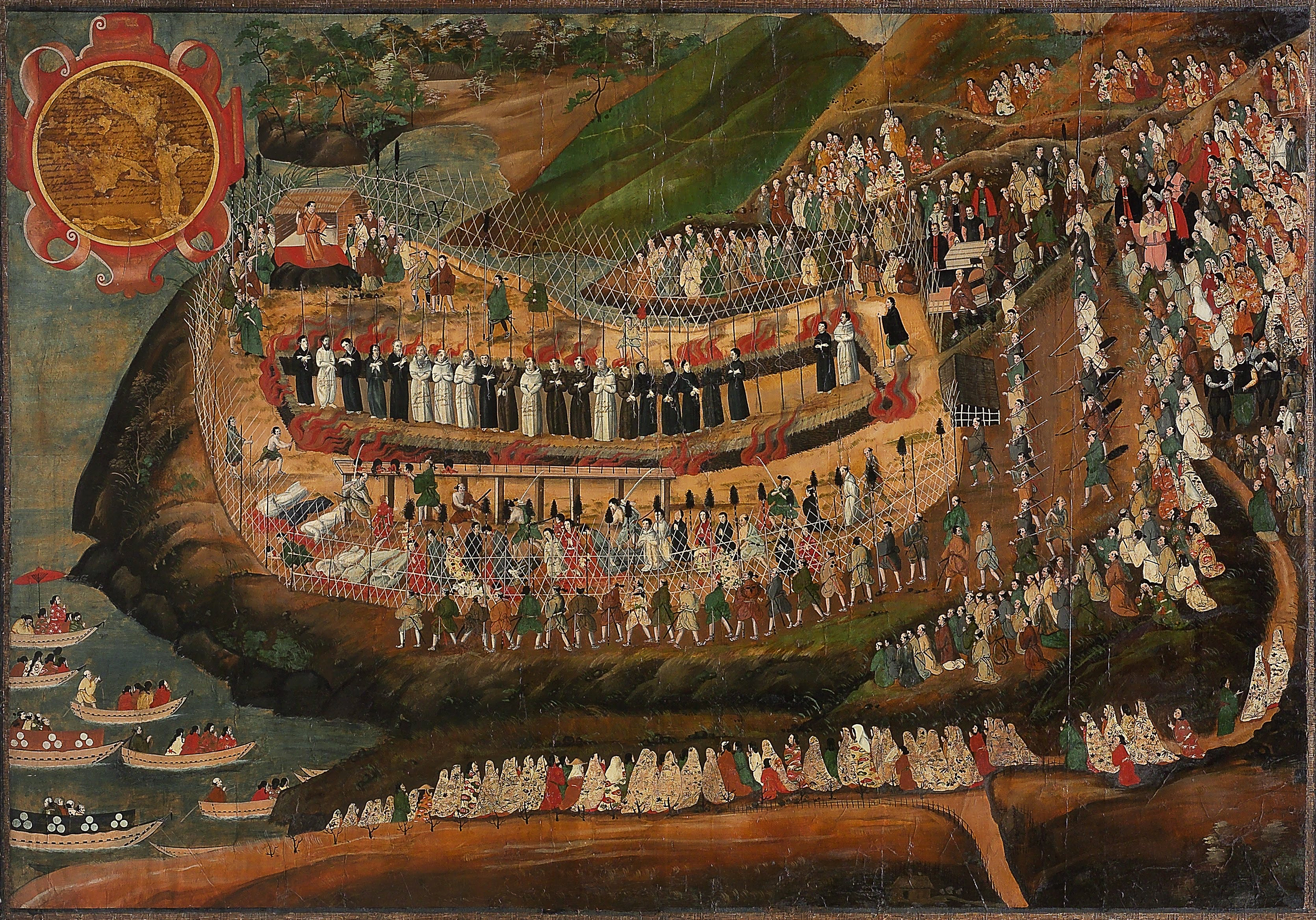
The 1622 Great Genna Martyrdom included crucifixions

In 1597, 26 Christian Martyrs were nailed to crosses at Nagasaki, Japan. Among those executed were Saints Paulo Miki, Philip of Jesus and Pedro Bautista, a Spanish Franciscan. The executions marked the beginning of a long history of persecution of Christianity in Japan, which continued until its decriminalization in 1871.

Crucifixion was used as a punishment for prisoners of war during World War II. Ringer Edwards, an Australian prisoner of war, was crucified for killing cattle, along with two others. He survived 63 hours before being let down.

=== Burma ===
In Burma, crucifixion was a central element in several execution rituals. Felix Carey, a missionary in Burma from 1806 to 1812, wrote the following:

Four or five persons, after being nailed through their hands and feet to a scaffold, had first their tongues cut out, then their mouths slit open from ear to ear, then their ears cut off, and finally their bellies ripped open.

Six people were crucified in the following manner: their hands and feet nailed to a scaffold; then their eyes were extracted with a blunt hook; and in this condition they were left to expire; two died in the course of four days; the rest were liberated, but died of mortification on the sixth or seventh day.

Four persons were crucified, viz. not nailed but tied with their hands and feet stretched out at full length, in an erect posture. In this posture they were to remain till death; every thing they wished to eat was ordered them with a view to prolong their lives and misery. In cases like this, the legs and feet of the criminals begin to swell and mortify at the expiration of three or four days; some are said to live in this state for a fortnight, and expire at last from fatigue and mortification. Those which I saw, were liberated at the end of three or four days.

== Archaeological evidence ==
Although the Roman historians Josephus and Appian refer to the crucifixion of thousands during the Roman-Jewish wars in Judaea by the Romans and historical descriptions are multitude enough that it is practically unanimously considered to have been a real punishment, there are few actual archaeological remains. A prominent example is the crucified body found in a Jewish tomb dating back to the 1st century which was discovered at Givat HaMivtar, Jerusalem in 1968. The remains were accidentally found in an ossuary with the crucified man's name on it, "Jehohanan, the son of Hagakol." Nicu Haas, from the Hebrew University Medical School, examined the ossuary and discovered that it contained a heel bone with a nail driven through its side, indicating that the man had been crucified. The position of the nail relative to the bone suggests the feet had been nailed to the cross from their side, not from their front; various opinions have been proposed as to whether they were both nailed together to the front of the cross or one on the left side, one on the right side. The point of the nail had olive wood fragments on it indicating that he was crucified on a cross made of olive wood or on an olive tree.

Additionally, a piece of acacia wood was located between the bones and the head of the nail, presumably to keep the condemned from freeing his foot by sliding it over the nail. His legs were found broken, possibly to hasten his death. It is thought that because iron was valuable in earlier Roman times, the nails were removed from the dead body to reduce costs. According to Haas, this could help to explain why only one nail has been found, as the tip of the nail in question was bent in such a way that it could not be removed. Haas had also identified a scratch on the inner surface of the right radius bone of the forearm, close to the wrist. He deduced from the form of the scratch, as well as from the intact wrist bones, that a nail had been driven into the forearm at that position.

However, many of Haas' findings have been challenged. For instance, it was subsequently determined that the scratches on the wrist area were non-traumatic – therefore, there was no evidence of crucifixion – while reexamination of the heel bone revealed that the two heels were not nailed together, instead, they were nailed separately to either side of the upright post of the cross.

In 2007, a possible case of a crucified body, with a round hole in a heel bone, possibly caused by a nail, was discovered in the Po Valley near Rovigo, in northern Italy. In 2017 part of a crucified body, with a nail in the heel, was additionally discovered at Fenstanton in the United Kingdom. Further studies suggested that the remains may be those of a slave, because at that time crucifixion was banned in Roman law for citizens, although not necessarily for slaves.

== Modern use ==
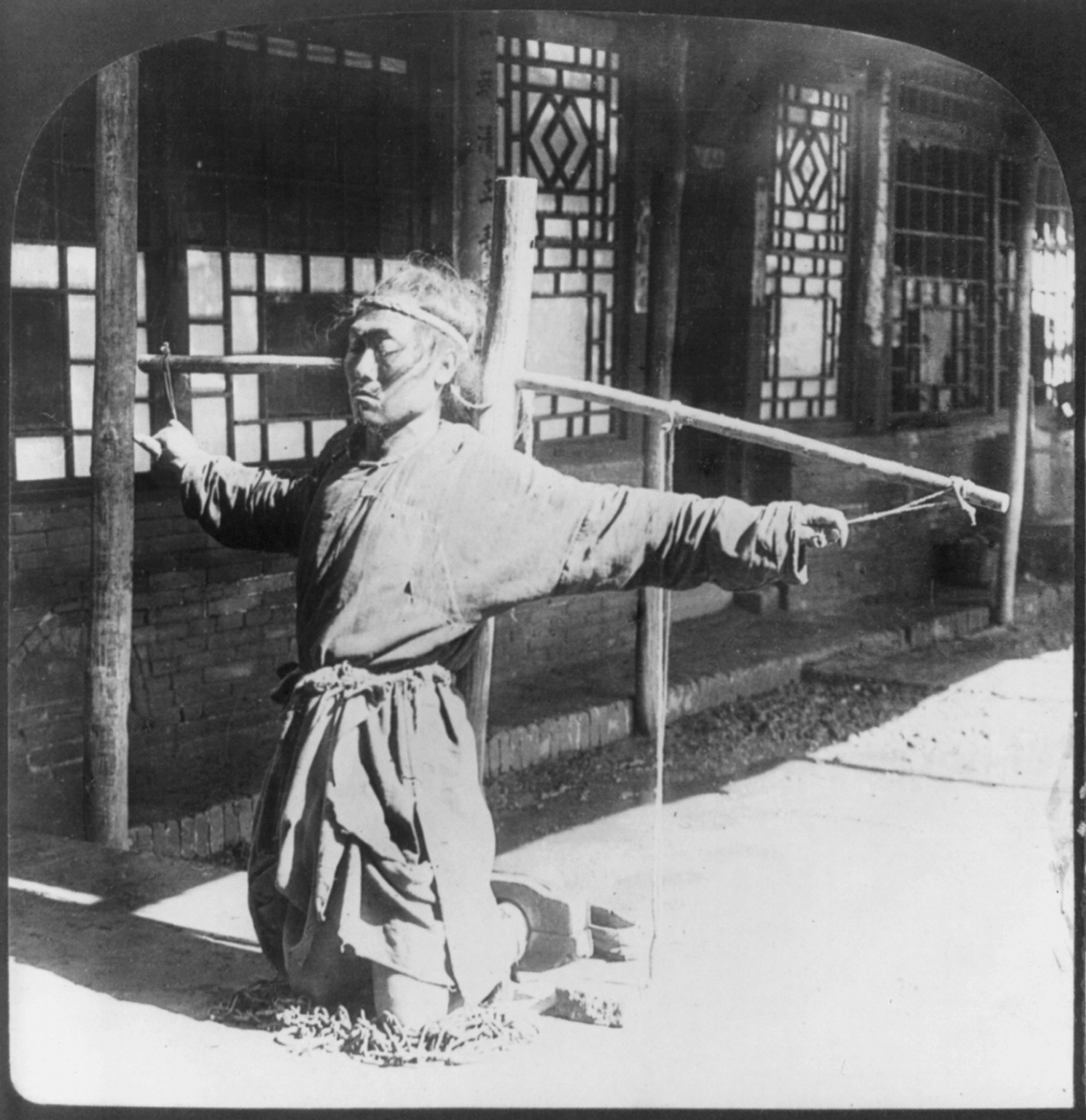
Prisoner kneeling on chains, thumbs supporting arms, photographic print on stereo card, Mukden, China (c. 1906)

=== Europe ===
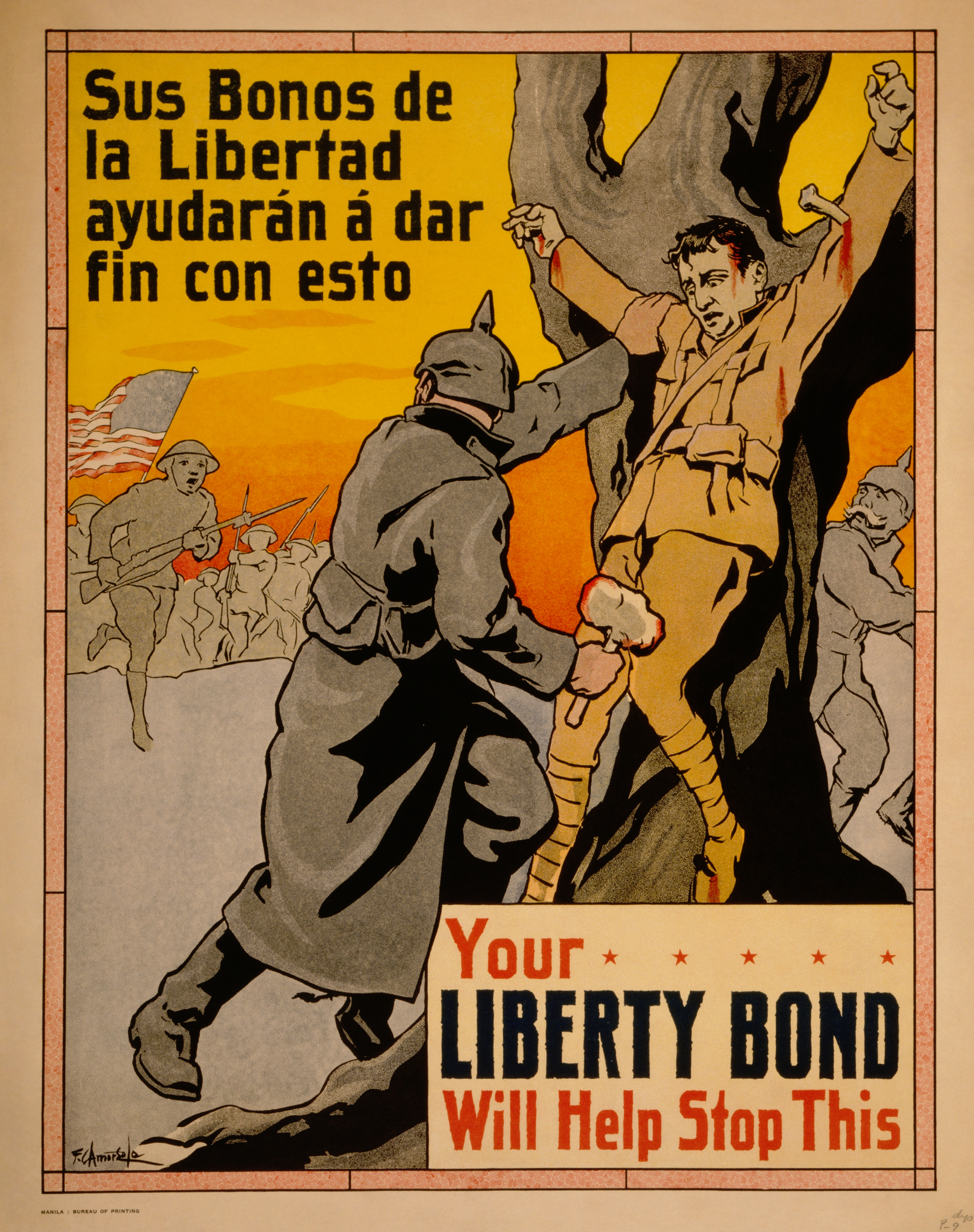
Poster showing a German soldier nailing a man to a tree, as American soldiers come to his rescue. Published in Manila by Bureau of Printing (1917).

During World War I, there were persistent rumors that German soldiers had crucified a Canadian soldier on a tree or barn door with bayonets or combat knives. The event was initially reported in 1915 by Private George Barrie of the 1st Canadian Division. Two investigations, one a post-war official investigation, and the other an independent investigation by the Canadian Broadcasting Corporation, concluded that there was no evidence to support the story. However, British documentary maker Iain Overton in 2001 published an article claiming that the story was true, identifying the soldier as Harry Band. Overton's article was the basis for a 2002 episode of the Channel 4 documentary show Secret History.

It has been reported that crucifixion was used in several cases against the German civil population of East Prussia when it was occupied by Soviet forces at the end of World War II.

In 2005, a priest and four nuns in Romania were convicted of crucifying Maricica Irina Cornici, a 25 year old nun with schizophrenia, who they believed was possessed by the devil.

=== South Sudan ===
In 2017, the Standard News Channel reported on a series of crimes against civilians, including women being hung up trees.

=== Legal execution in Islamic states ===
Crucifixion is still used as a rare method of execution in Saudi Arabia. The punishment of crucifixion (șalb), imposed in accordance with Islamic law, is variously interpreted as exposure of the body after execution, crucifixion followed by stabbing in the chest, or crucifixion for three days, survivors of which are allowed to live.

Several people were subjected to crucifixion in Saudi Arabia in the 2010s, but on occasion, they were beheaded and then, their bodies were crucified. In March 2013, a robber was set to be executed by being crucified for three days. However, the method was changed to death by firing squad. The Saudi Press Agency reported that the body of another individual was crucified after his execution in April 2019 as part of a crackdown on charges of terrorism.

Ali Mohammed Baqir al-Nimr was arrested in 2012 when he was 17 years old for taking part in an anti-government protest in Saudi Arabia during the Arab Spring. In May 2014, Ali al-Nimr was sentenced to be publicly beheaded and crucified.

Theoretically, crucifixion is still one of the Hadd punishments in Iran. If a crucified person were to survive three days of crucifixion, that person would be allowed to live. Execution by hanging is described as follows: "In execution by hanging, the prisoner will be hung on a hanging truss which should look like a cross, while his (her) back is toward the cross, and (s)he faces the direction of Mecca [in Saudi Arabia], and his (her) legs are vertical and distant from the ground."

Sudan's penal code, based upon the government's interpretation of shari'a, includes execution followed by crucifixion as a penalty. When, in 2002, 88 people were sentenced to death for crimes relating to murder, armed robbery, and participating in ethnic clashes, Amnesty International wrote that they could be executed by either hanging or crucifixion.

=== Jihadism ===
On 5 February 2015, the United Nations Committee on the Rights of the Child (CRC) reported that the Islamic State of Iraq and the Levant (ISIL) had committed "several cases of mass executions of boys, as well as reports of beheadings, crucifixions of children and burying children alive".

On 30 April 2014, a total of seven public executions were carried out in Raqqa, northern Syria. The pictures, originally posted on Twitter by a student at Oxford University, were retweeted on a Twitter account which was owned by a known member of ISIL, causing major media outlets to incorrectly attribute the origin of the post to the militant group. In most of these cases of crucifixion, the victims are shot, then their bodies are displayed but there have also been reports of crucifixion preceding shootings or decapitations as well as a case where a man was said to have been "crucified alive for eight hours" with no indication of whether he died.

=== Other incidents ===
The human rights group Karen Women Organization documented a case in which Tatmadaw forces crucified several Karen villagers in 2000 in the Dooplaya District in Burma's Kayin State.

On 22 January 2014, Dmytro Bulatov, a Ukrainian anti-government activist and a member of AutoMaidan, claimed that he was kidnapped by unknown persons who were "speaking in Russian accents" and tortured for a week. His captors kept him in the dark, beat him, cut off a piece of his ear, and nailed him to a cross. His captors ultimately left him in a forest outside Kyiv after forcing him to confess to being an American spy and accepting money from the US Embassy in Ukraine to organize protests against then-President Viktor Yanukovych. Bulatov said he believed Russian secret services were responsible.

In 1997, the Ministry of Justice in the United Arab Emirates issued a statement which read that a court had sentenced two murderers to be crucified, followed by their executions the next day. A Ministry of Justice official later stated that the crucifixion sentence should be considered cancelled. The crucifixions were not carried out, and the convicts were instead executed by firing squad.

During the Russian Invasion of Ukraine, Captain Vladyslav Pastukh of the Ukrainian 211th Pontoon Bridge Brigade crucified another member of the brigade by tying the soldier's hands to a wooden cross and tying the soldier's helmet to his left arm. He then took a picture of himself squatting in front of the cross with the soldier's body hanging from it. On 16 December 2024, Ukrainian defense minister Rustem Umerov ordered an immediate investigation into the incident as well as an investigation into other alleged abuse, extortion, and humiliation of soldiers of the 211th Pontoon Bridge Brigade by their commanding officers.

On 28 April 2025, Reverend William "Bill" Schonemann of New River, Arizona, was found dead in his home, having been crucified by Adam Sheafe of California. Schonemann was the lead pastor at New River Bible Church, a non-denominational Christian church. Sheafe admitted during an interview with a local news station that "he planned to 'execute' and 'crucify' a total of 14 priests in 10 states across the country before being caught by police after the murder of his first victim." The Maricopa County, Arizona, attorney's office charged Sheafe with eight felonies: one count of first degree murder, three counts of attempt to commit first-degree murder, one count of burglary in the second degree, one count of burglary in the first degree, one count of kidnapping, and one count of theft of means of transportation (for stealing the car he kidnapped Schonemann in). He was also charged with one misdemeanor count of criminal trespass in the second degree. On 28 October 2025, the Maricopa County, Arizona, attorney's office announced they intended to seek the death penalty against Sheafe.

== In culture and arts ==
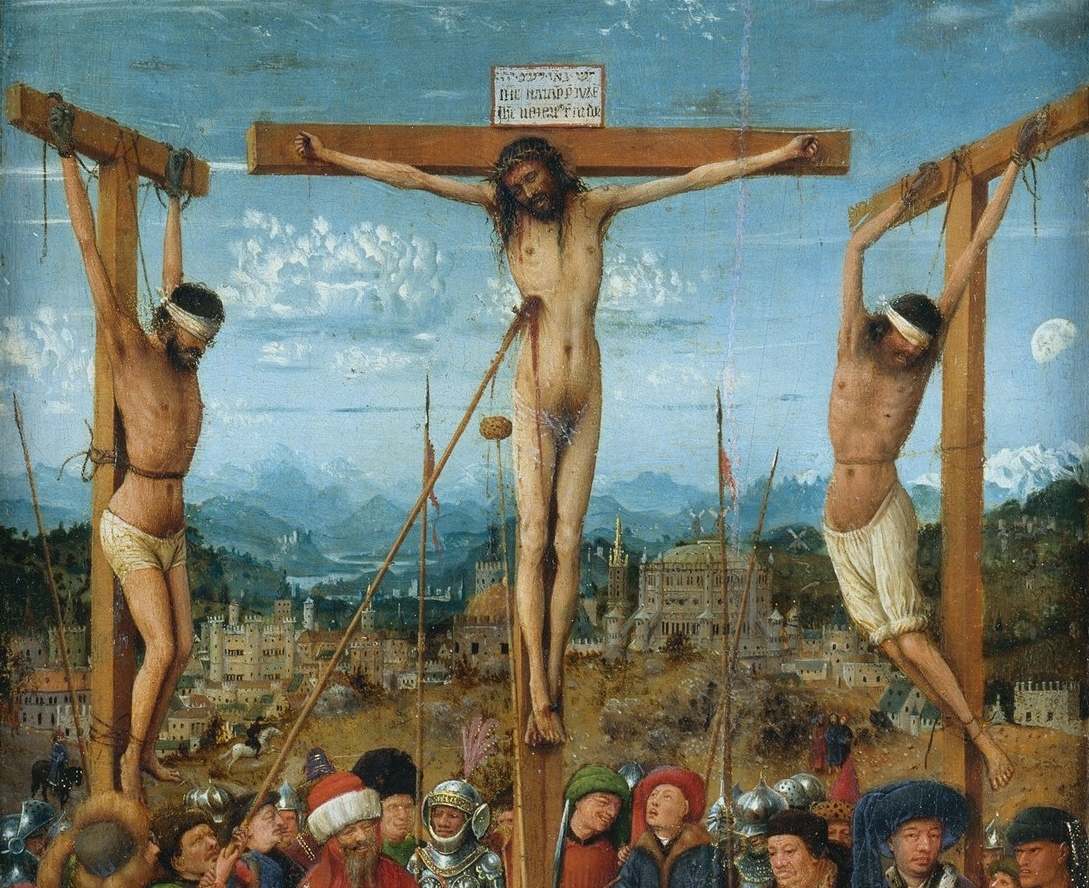
Crucifixion, by Jan Van Eyck (c. 1430–1440)

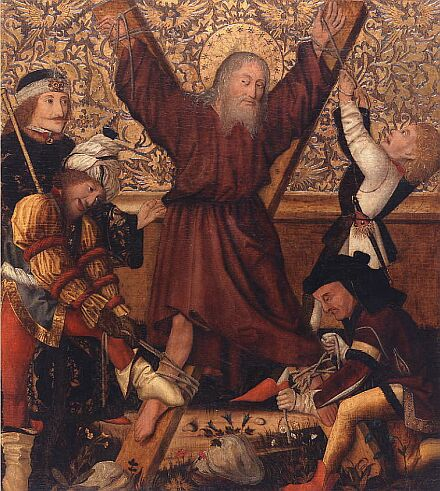
Crucifixion of st Andrew 1470–1480

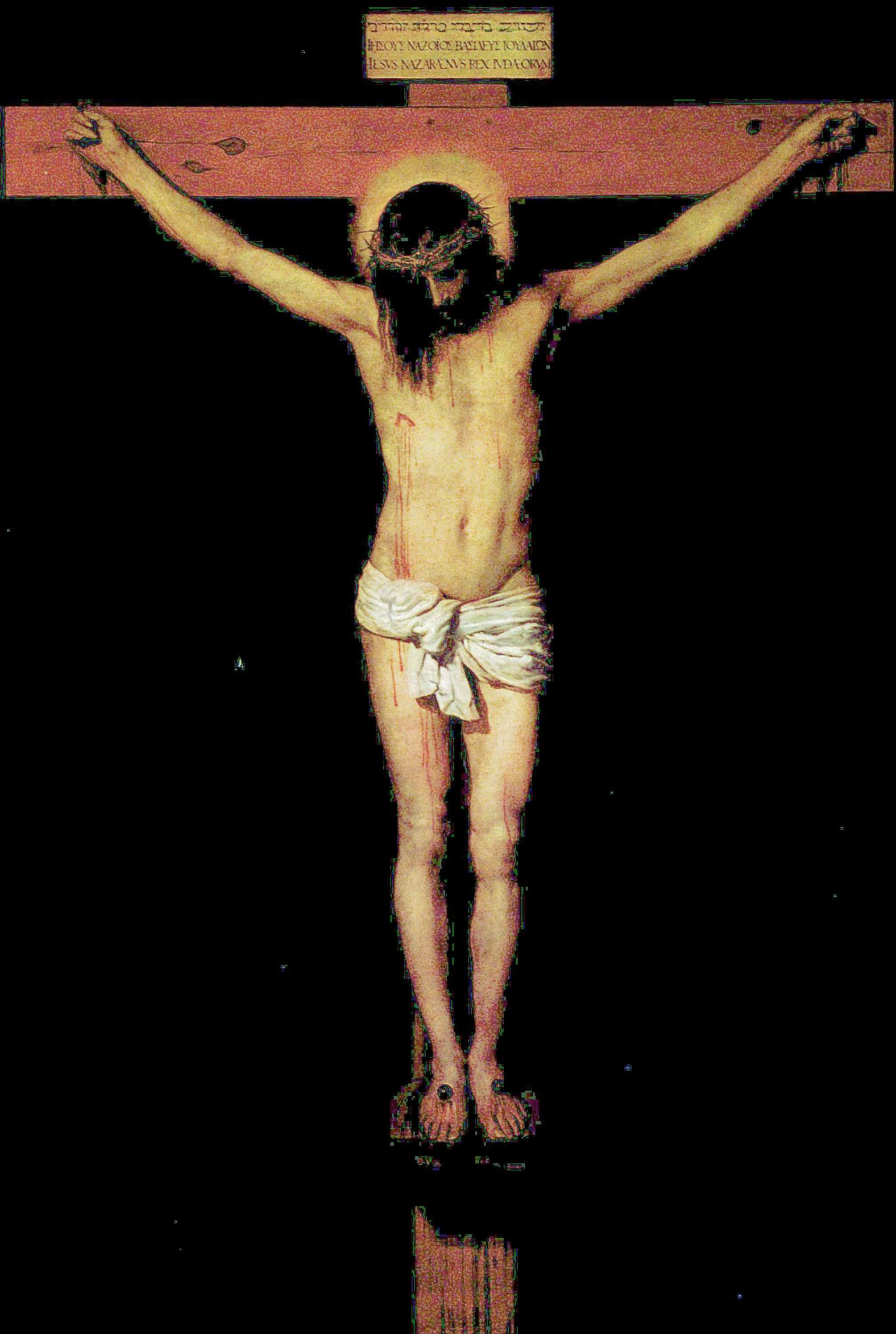
Christ Crucified, by Diego Velázquez (1632)

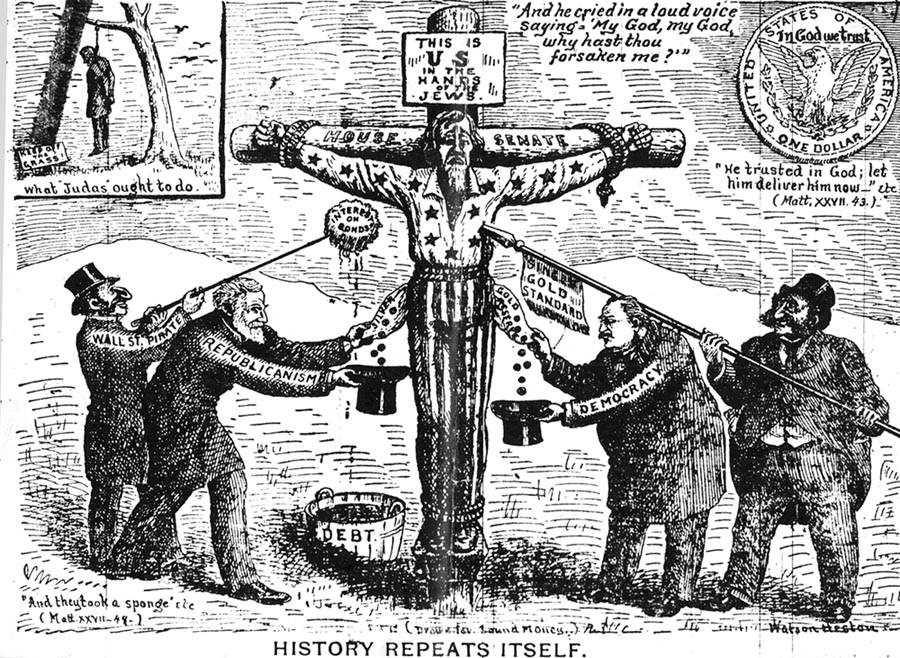
Antisemitic American political cartoon, Sound Money magazine, April 15, 1896, issue

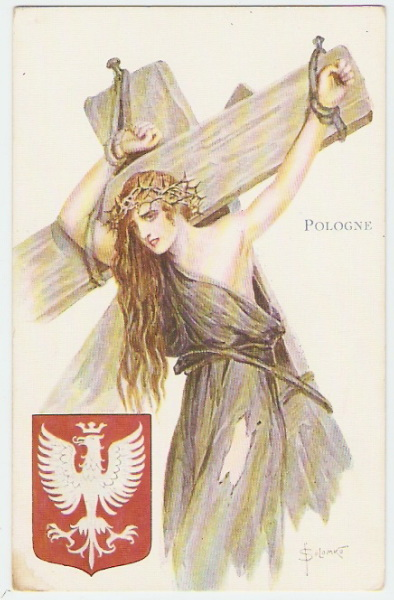
Allegory of Poland (1914–1918), postcard by Sergey Solomko

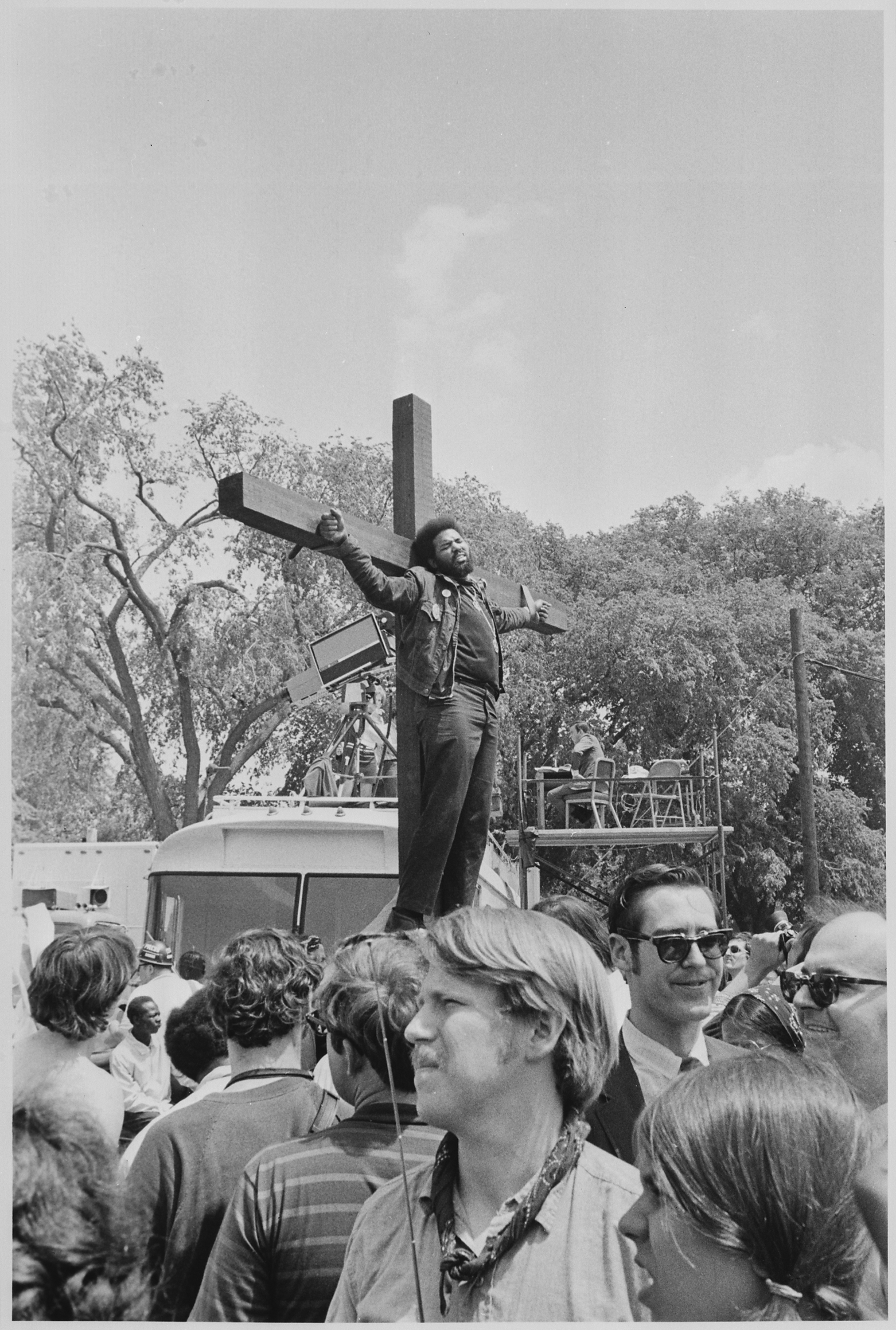
Protester tied to a cross in Washington D.C. (1970)

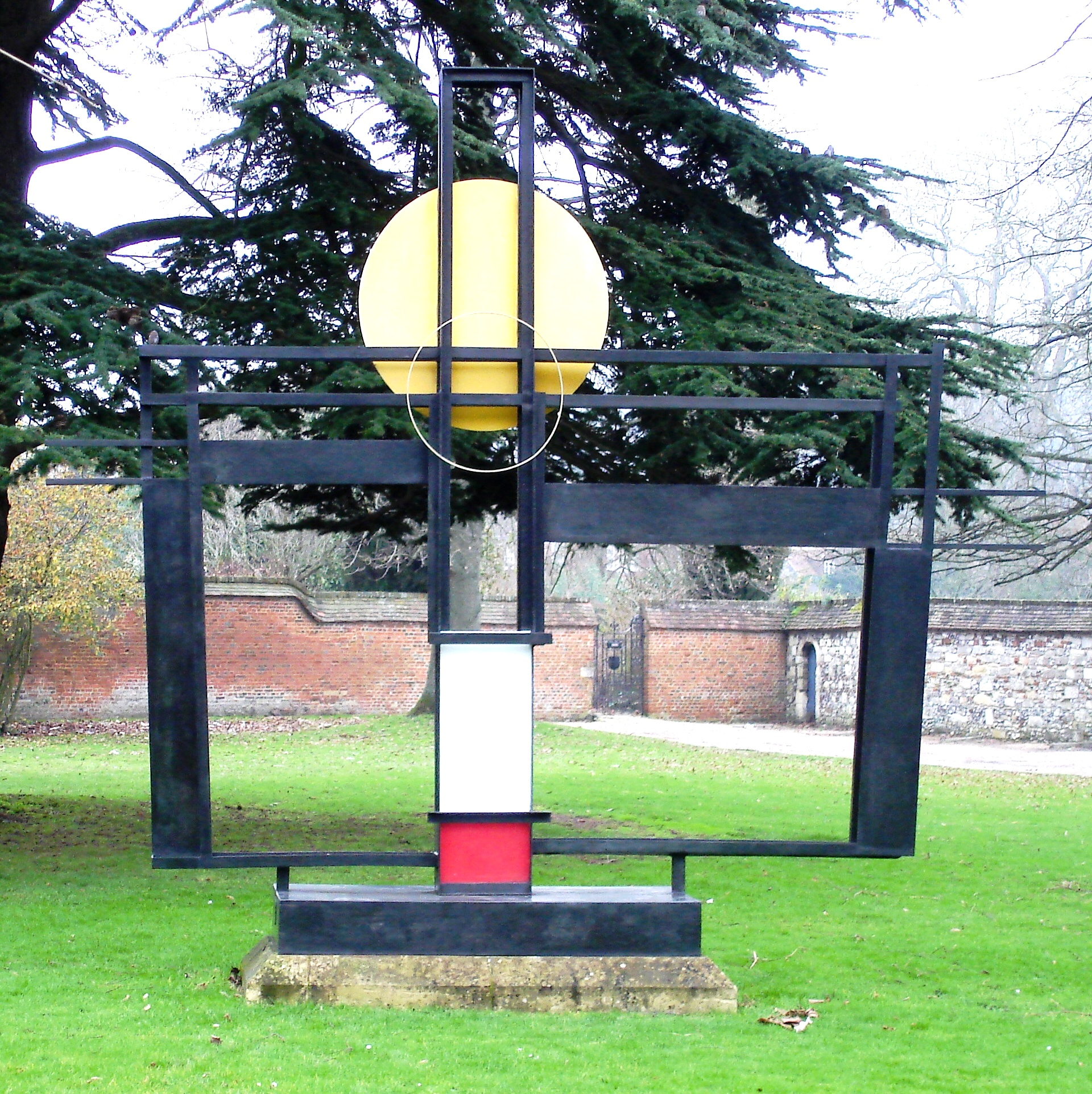
Sculpture construction: Crucifixion, homage to Mondrian, by Barbara Hepworth, United Kingdom (2007)

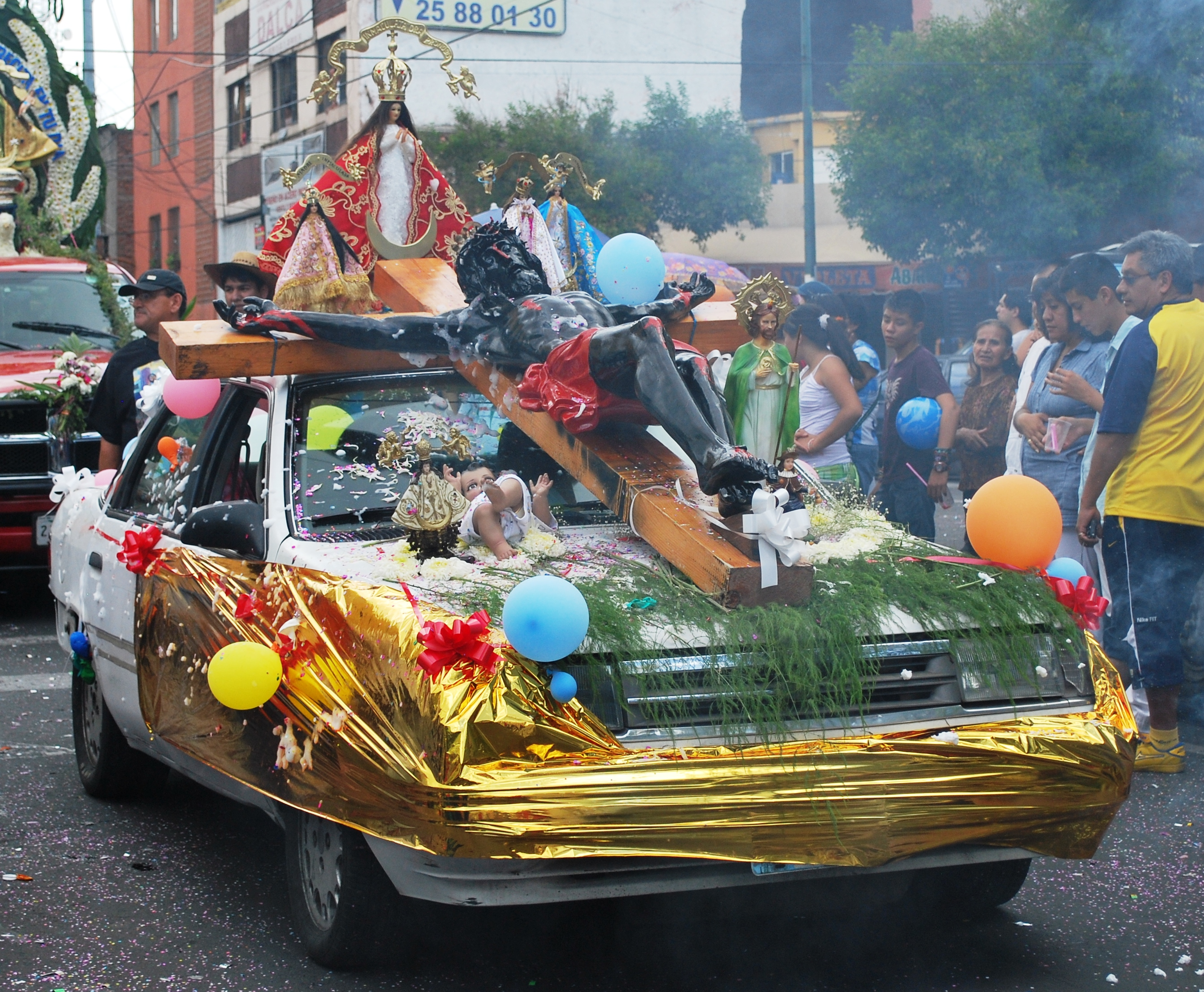
Car-float at the feast of the Virgin of San Juan de los Lagos, Colonia Doctores, Mexico City (2011)

== As a devotional practice ==
In July 1805, a man named Mattio Lovat attempted to crucify himself at a public street in Venice, Italy. The attempt was unsuccessful, and he was sent to an asylum, where he died a year later.

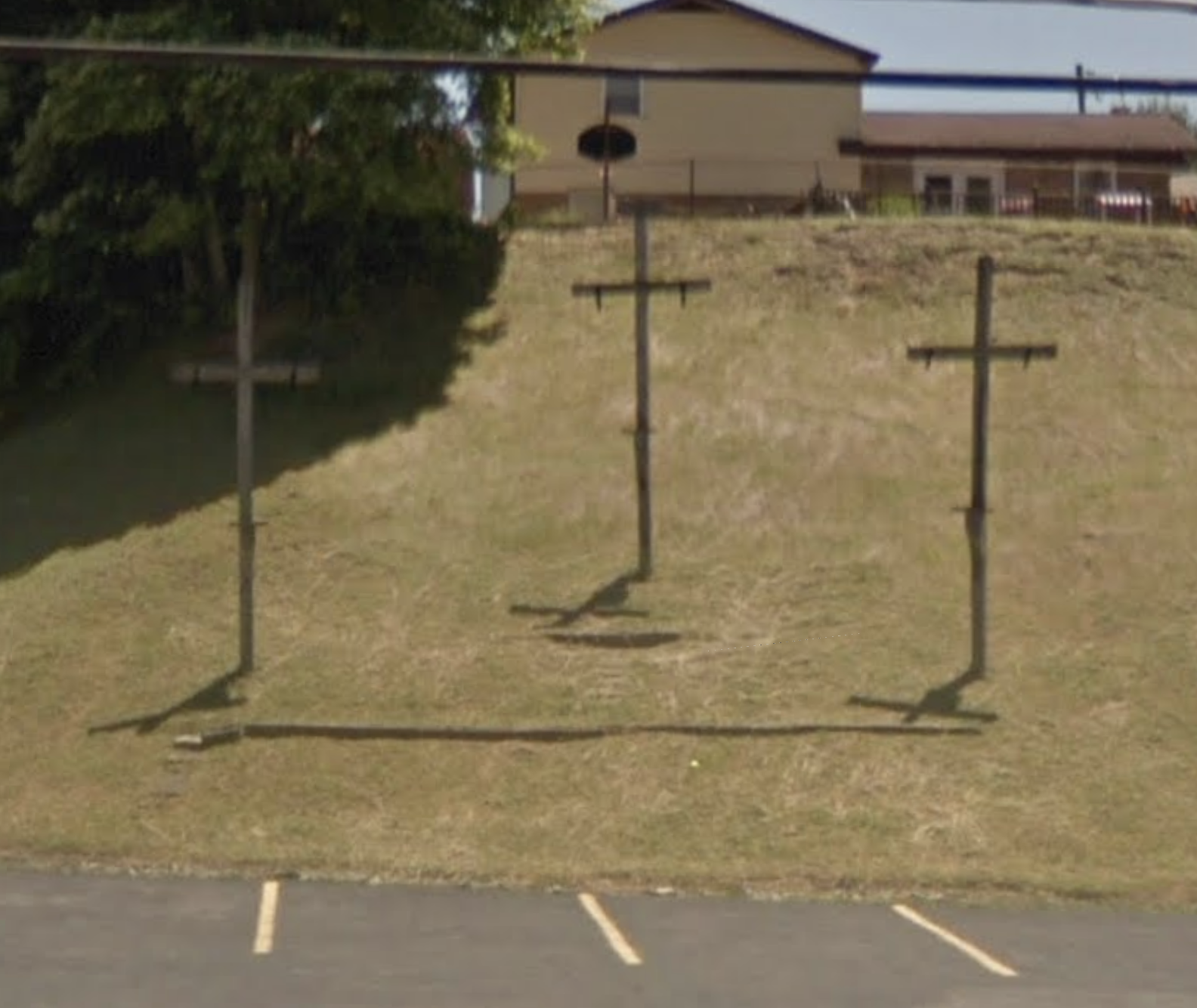
Crosses used for mock crucifixions during Holy Week at Calvary Baptist Church, in Oak Hill, WV

In some cases, a crucifixion is simulated within a passion play, as in the ceremonial re-enactment that has been performed yearly in the town of Iztapalapa, on the outskirts of Mexico City, since 1833, and in the famous Oberammergau Passion Play. Also, since at least the mid-19th century, a group of flagellants in New Mexico, called Hermanos de Luz ("Brothers of Light"), have annually conducted reenactments of Christ's crucifixion during Holy Week, in which a penitent is tied—but not nailed—to a cross. This tradition is sometimes practiced in other regions of the United States, such as Appalachia, where members of Protestant churches stage mock crucifixions in which worshippers hang from straps on the crosses during Good Friday re-enactments.

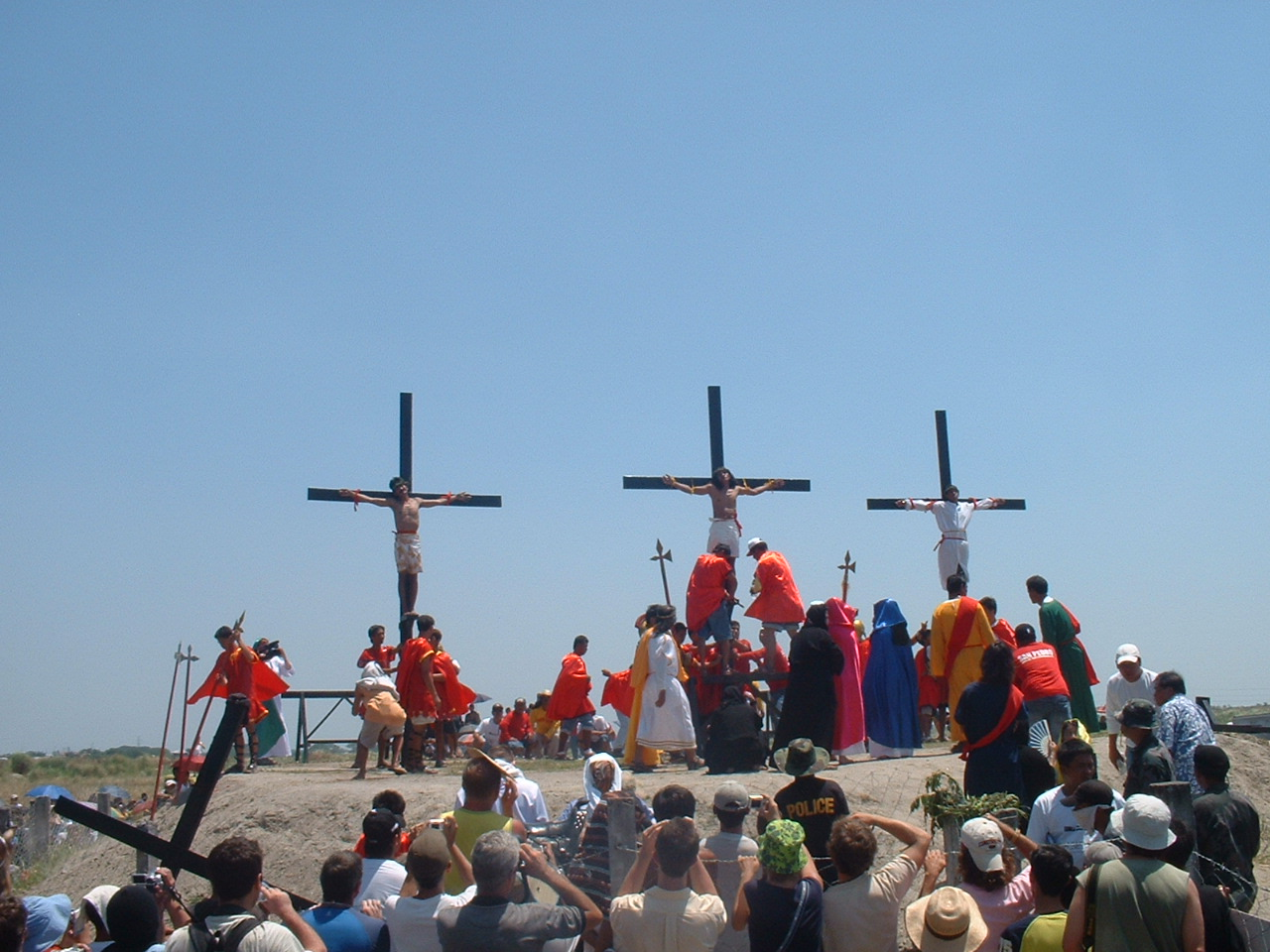
Devotional crucifixion in San Fernando, Pampanga, Philippines, Easter 2006

The Catholic Church frowns upon self-crucifixion as a form of devotion: "Penitential practices leading to self-crucifixion with nails are not to be encouraged." Despite this, the practice persists in the Philippines, where some Catholics are voluntarily, non-lethally crucified for a limited time on Good Friday to imitate the sufferings of Christ. Pre-sterilised nails are driven through the palm of the hand between the bones, while there is a footrest to which the feet are nailed. Rolando del Campo, a carpenter in Pampanga, vowed to be crucified every Good Friday for 15 years if God would carry his wife through a difficult childbirth, while in San Pedro Cutud, Ruben Enaje has been crucified 37 times. The Filipino Catholic Church has repeatedly voiced disapproval of crucifixions and self-flagellation, while the government has noted that it cannot deter devotees. The Department of Health recommends that participants in the rites should have tetanus shots and that the nails used should be sterilized.

In 2009, Australian radio personality/satirist/documentarian John Safran took part in a devotional crucifixion in the Philippines, depicted in episode 8 of his documentary series John Safran's Race Relations (2009). Safran was crucified in Barangay Kapitangan, Paombong, Bulacan, just outside Manila, along with three other men and one woman. He had nails driven through his hands and feet and hung on the cross for five minutes before being taken down and given medical treatment in a nearby tent set up for the purpose.

In 2011, a South Korean taxi driver named Kim Jun-bong committed suicide by crucifixion in imitation of the death of Jesus. An investigation by the National Forensic Service (NFS) determined that he had acted alone, and it also determined that the method by which he crucified himself was technically possible, but it was very difficult and painful.

== Notable crucifixions ==
This list includes stories from religious scripture and other stories that are told differently by different cultures or religions.

- The rebellious slaves who waged the Third Servile War: Between 73 and 71 BCE, a band of slaves, eventually numbering about 120,000, under the (at least partial) leadership of Spartacus openly revolted against the Roman republic. The rebellion was eventually crushed and while Spartacus most likely died during the final battle of the revolt, approximately 6,000 of his followers were crucified along the 200-km Appian Way between Capua and Rome as a warning to other would-be rebels.
- Jehohanan: a Jewish man who was crucified around the time that Jesus was crucified; it is widely believed that his ankles were nailed to the side of the stipes of the cross.
- Jesus: His death by crucifixion under Pontius Pilate (c. 30 or 33 CE), recounted in the four 1st-century canonical Gospels, is repeatedly referred to as an event which is well known in the earlier letters of Saint Paul, for instance, five times in his First Letter to the Corinthians, written in 57 CE (1:13, 1:18, 1:23, 2:2, 2:8). Pilate, the Roman governor of Judaea province at the time, is explicitly linked to the condemnation of Jesus by the Gospels, and subsequently, by Tacitus. According to the Gospels, he acquitted Jesus of claiming to be King of the Jews, but, to prevent a riot, authorised his execution on conviction by the Sanhedrin of blasphemy.
- Saint Peter: a Christian apostle, who, according to tradition, was crucified upside-down at his own request (hence, the Cross of Saint Peter), because he did not feel worthy enough to die in the way that Jesus died.
- Saint Andrew: a Christian apostle and Saint Peter's brother, who is traditionally believed to have been crucified on an X-shaped cross (hence the Saint Andrew's Cross).
- Simeon of Jerusalem: second Bishop of Jerusalem, crucified in either 106 or 107 CE.
- Mani: the founder of Manicheanism; he was depicted by followers as having died by crucifixion in 274 CE.
- Eulalia of Barcelona was venerated as a saint. According to her hagiography, she was stripped naked, tortured, and ultimately crucified on an X-shaped cross.
- Wilgefortis was venerated as a saint and she was represented as a crucified woman; however, her legend resulted from a misinterpretation of a full-clothed crucifix which is known as the Volto Santo of Lucca.
- The 26 Martyrs of Japan were crucified and impaled with spears.
- Kim Jun-bong, the subject of the 2011 Mungyeong crucifixion case in South Korea.
- In 1974, performance artist Chris Burden crucified himself non-lethally to a Volkswagen Beetle for his performance Trans-Fixed.

== See also ==
- Outline of capital punishment
- Bibliography of the history of capital punishment
- Breaking wheel
- Crucifixion darkness
- List of methods of capital punishment
- Positional asphyxia
- Shroud of Turin
- Tropaion
- True Cross
