= Ruben Enaje =

Filipino carpenter

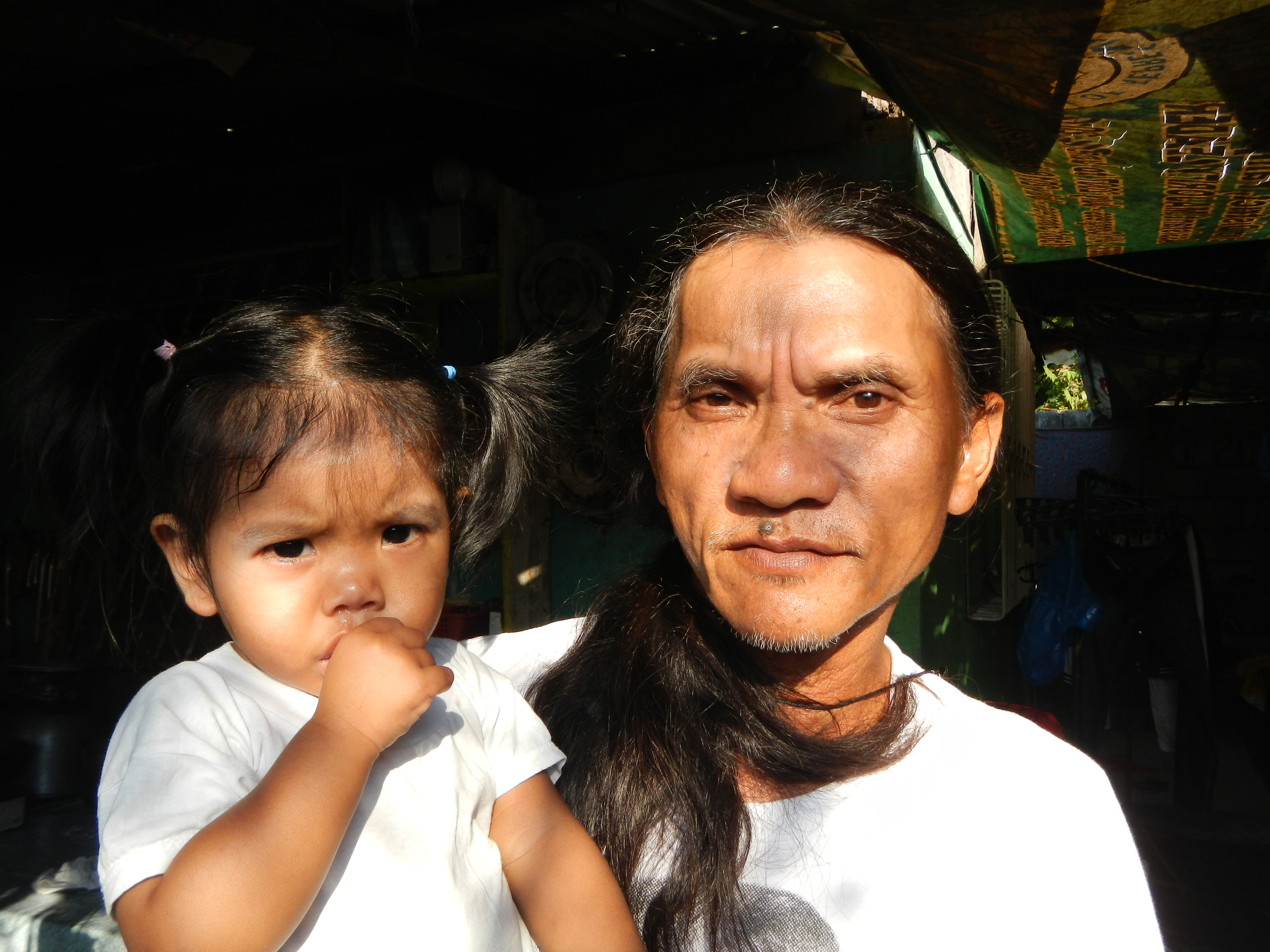
- Enaje (right) in 2014
- Born: 1960 or 1961 (age 65–66); San Fernando, Pampanga, Philippines
- Occupations: Carpenter, Construction worker
- Known for: Being voluntarily crucified annually on Good Friday

Ruben Enaje (born 1960 or 1961) is a Filipino carpenter, sign painter, and former construction worker. He was noted for being a participant of the San Pedro Cutud Lenten Rites, being crucified 37 times as of 2026. He had been crucified every Good Friday since 1986, except from 2020 to 2022 due to the COVID-19 pandemic, and his last crucifixion took place in 2026.

== Background ==
Enaje, who was once a construction worker in the Philippines, fell down from an unfinished building in Tarlac, and unexpectedly survived. After the incident, saying that it was to thank the Lord for saving him, Enaje started participating in crucifixions, of his own free will, in a ritual done on Good Friday every year. Initially done only for nine years since the incident, he continued with another set of nine years as a petition for the healing of his daughter from asthma and another nine years for the good health of his wife.

== Crucifixions ==
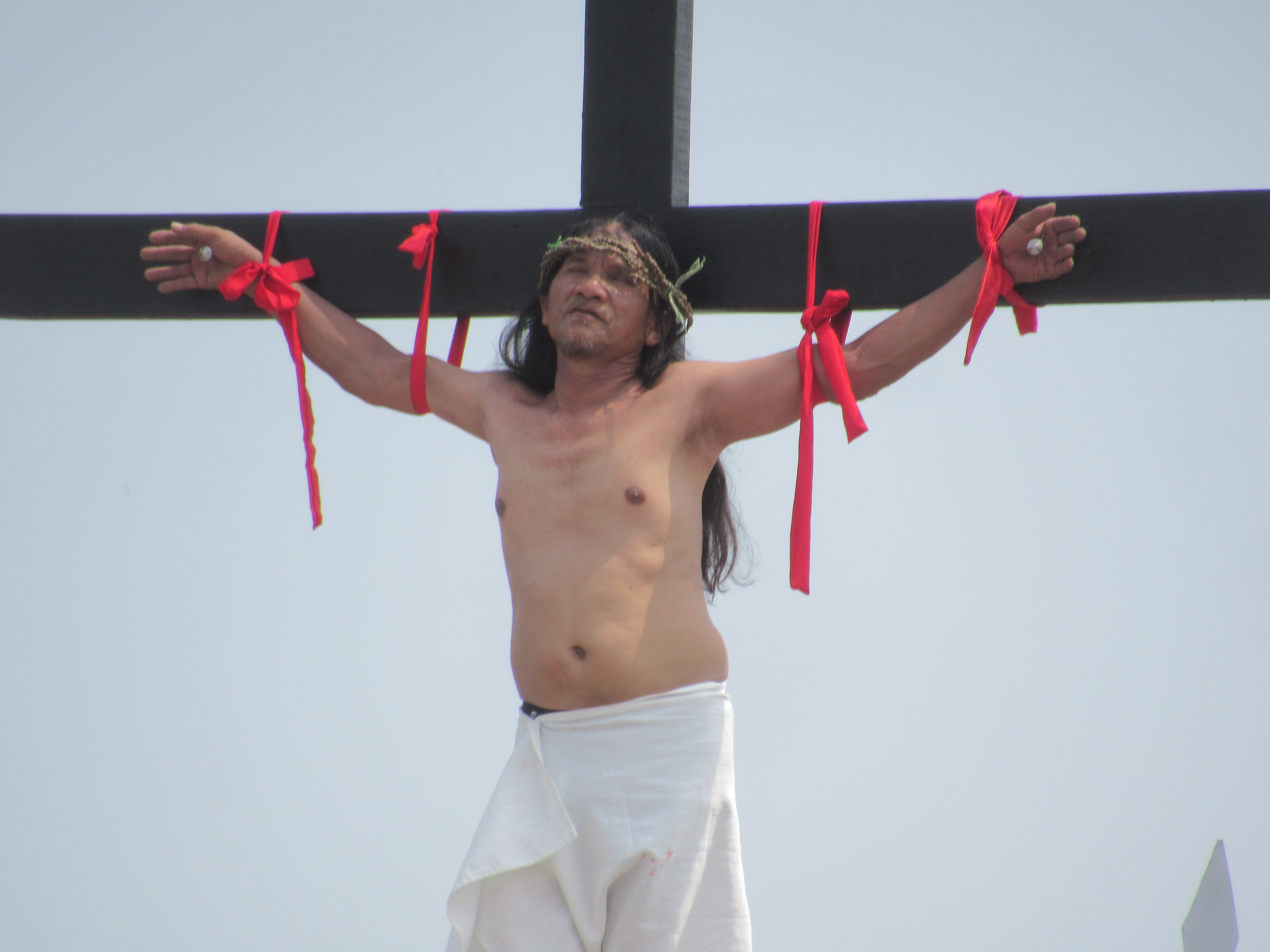
Enaje's 34th reenactment of the crucifixion in 2023

Enaje was crucified for his first time in 1986. He had promised God that he would be crucified 27 times, which came to pass in 2013. He continued thereafter as there were no replacements found. He offered his 30th crucifixion, in 2016, to the people of Belgium, who had recently suffered from a terrorist attack, and prayed for a more peaceful outcome of the 2016 Philippine general election.

In 2019, Enaje re-iterated his hopes to finally find a replacement, having been crucified once a year for 33 years (which, according to the Bible, is the same number of years that Jesus was alive). He was crucified for the 34th time in 2023, resuming his participation in the crucifixion after it was halted from 2020 to 2022 due to the COVID-19 pandemic. He initially said that this enactment would be his last. However, he was crucified once again in his 35th reenactment on the following Good Friday for world peace, especially for the war in Ukraine, Gaza, and the territorial disputes in the South China Sea. In 2025, he was crucified for the 36th time and told the media that it would be his last time portraying Jesus in a crucifixion reenactment. Despite that initial announcement, he was crucified again for the 37th time on April 3, 2026 since no one has been found as his successor to continue his role as Jesus in the rites, but he says this will truly be his last.

== See also ==
- San Pedro Cutud Lenten Rites
- Crucifixion in the Philippines
