= Dundeoksan =

Mountain in South Korea

Coordinates: 36°39′N 127°58′E

Highest point
- Elevation: 969 m (3,179 ft)

Geography
- Location: North Gyeongsang Province, South Korea

Dundeoksan (Korean: 둔덕산) is a mountain of North Gyeongsang Province, eastern South Korea. It has an elevation of 969 metres.

== Incidents and accidents ==
The Mungyeong crucifixion case occurred here.

== See also ==
- List of mountains of Korea
