= Self-crucifixion of Mattio Lovat =

Public self-crucifixion in 1805

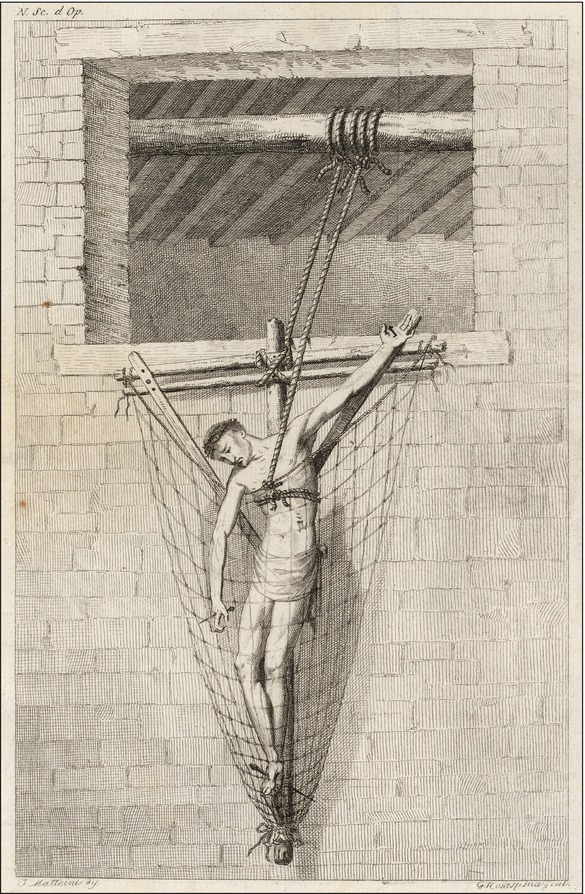
- Mattio Lovat hanging from a window during his second self-crucifixion attempt
- Date: July 1805
- Location: Venice, Italy
- Type: Self-crucifixion
- Participants: Mattio Lovat
- Casualties: Survived (Mattio died in April 1806)

Between 1803 and 1805, an Italian shoemaker named Mattio Lovat made two attempts to crucify himself in public settings, including outside the third-floor window of his Venice, Italy home. Both times, he was prevented from doing so and rescued by passersby, where he recovered. Lovat later died in 1806 at a mental hospital on the island of San Servolo.

== Background ==
Mattio Lovat was born in 1761 to a poor family in Casal, in the territory of Belluno, Italy. Lovat worked as a shoemaker, and in November 1802, he moved to Venice. His younger brother Angelo helped him find lodging at the house of a widow, and he stayed there until the first of his two attempts at self-crucifixion.

== Self-crucifixion attempts ==
In 1803, in the middle of the street called Cross of Biri, Lovat made an attempt at self-crucifixion upon a frame that he had constructed using the timber of his bed. He was prevented from succeeding by several people who came upon him as he was driving a nail into his left foot. When interrogated about the motive for his self-crucifixion, he was silent. He once said to his brother that that day was the festival of St. Matthew and that he could give no further explanation. Days after the incident, Lovat set out for his homeland in the Belluno region, where he remained for some time before returning to Venice. In July 1805, he lodged in a room on the third floor of a house in the street Delle Monache.

On July 19, 1805, Lovat again attempted to crucify himself in a public street. He constructed a wooden cross, inflicted a wound on his side, and put a crown of thorns on his head in order to re-enact the crucifixion of Jesus Christ; he then fixed himself to the cross with nails. Using a net that tied his body to the wooden beam, he finally hung himself and the cross out of the window of his room. With his left arm nailed to the cross and his right hanging down, Lovat was found alive in the early morning by a passer-by who took him down from the cross and put him to bed.

== Aftermath ==
Venetian physician Cesare Ruggieri came to see Lovat out of curiosity and made sure that he was immediately admitted to the Clinical School of Venice, where he himself was a professor of surgery. For several weeks, Ruggieri treated and observed Lovat at his bedside until he had physically recovered from his self-crucifixion attempt. Due to Ruggieri's diagnosis of a persistent mental disorder, Lovat was then transferred to the asylum of San Servolo, an early mental asylum situated on an island of the same name in the Venetian lagoon, where Lovat died in April 1806 from an unspecified chest disease.

Soon after, Ruggieri wrote down the medical case history of his patient. In his case narrative, titled "Storia della crocifissione di Mattio Lovat da se stesso eseguita (The Story of the Crucifixion of Mattio Lovat Executed by Himself)," Ruggieri suggested that Lovat suffered from a kind of mental disorder that was connected to religion. Between 1806 and 1814, Ruggieri published the illustrated case report telling the story of his patient, one version in French and two in Italian, after which the narrative of Lovat's self-crucifixion was read, commented on, rewritten, and reproduced by editors and authors in Europe throughout the nineteenth century.

A case report about Lovat's self-crucifixion was published in 2013, and a book, The Man Who Crucified Himself: Readings of a Medical Case in Nineteenth-Century Europe, was published in November 2018.
