= Mungyeong crucifixion case =

2011 death in South Korea

The Mungyeong crucifixion case was a 2011 death investigation in South Korea. On May 1, 2011, the body of Kim Jun-bong, a 58-year-old taxi driver, was discovered crucified in an abandoned stone quarry on Mount Dundeok in Gaeun, Mungyeong, North Gyeongsang Province. After extensive investigation, the death was ruled a suicide.

== Background ==
The discovery occurred on May 1, 2011, in an abandoned quarry on Mount Dundeok, located in Gaeun, North Gyeongsang Province. The victim was identified as Kim Jun-bong, a 58-year-old taxi driver from Changwon, South Gyeongsang. Kim was found crucified in a manner apparently mimicking the crucifixion of Jesus. Kim was found nailed to a wooden cross measuring 187 centimeters high and 180 centimeters wide. He was wearing only white underwear and a crown of thorns on his head. The scene included several symbolic references to the Biblical account of the passion of Jesus.

Kim was attached to the cross by nails through his hands and feet. Two smaller wooden crosses were positioned on either side, representing the thieves crucified alongside Jesus according to Christian scripture. A black mirror was placed in front of the body, while mirrors were also attached to the smaller crosses to reflect the crucified body from multiple angles. He also displayed a 10-centimeter stab wound on the lower right abdomen, apparently mimicking the spear wound inflicted on Jesus during his crucifixion. Investigators discovered paper in Kim's tent bearing the inscription "Jesus of Nazareth, King of the Jews" written in Hebrew, Greek, and Latin, replicating the biblical account. A rope wrapped with duct tape was also present, seemingly representing the whipping that Jesus endured before his crucifixion.

Kim had been a pastor at a church in Seoul approximately 30 years prior to his death, though he later became associated with non-mainstream Protestant denominations. In March 2011, Kim began making preparations that would later be understood as planning for his self-crucifixion. He sold his private taxi, which had been his source of income, and vacated his rented room in Changwon. In early April, he purchased an SUV and lumber from a mill in Gimhae. Phone records later revealed that he had been planning this event for an extended period.

== Investigation ==
The National Forensic Service (NFS) conducted extensive examinations to determine the exact cause of death and the circumstances surrounding the incident. Their analysis determined that Kim died from heavy bleeding caused by the abdominal wound combined with suffocation from neck compression. The suffocation resulted from nylon strings that had been tied tightly around his neck, while the blood loss from the deliberately inflicted side wound contributed significantly to his death. The forensic examination revealed that holes in both hands had been drilled using tools discovered at the scene. An electric drill was found in Kim's tent, located approximately 30 meters from the cross. Additionally, a manual hand drill was discovered directly beside the cross. Inside Kim's tent, investigators found detailed blueprints and step-by-step instructions for performing the self-crucifixion. Similar cross-construction drawings and measurements were also discovered at his residence.

The NFS conducted practical experiments to determine whether self-crucifixion was physically possible. Using Kim's written instructions as a guide, forensic experts performed two separate reconstructions of the crucifixion process. Their conclusion was that an adult male could theoretically perform self-crucifixion, though it would require extraordinary pain tolerance and determination. The step-by-step instructions found in Kim's notes were tested and deemed feasible, though extremely difficult.

Financial records showed that Kim had systematically closed his bank accounts and cancelled various subscriptions before the incident, suggesting he was preparing for his death. No DNA, fingerprints, or other evidence of an accomplice was discovered anywhere at the scene.

== Case closure ==
On May 17, 2011, the Gyeongbuk Provincial Police Agency officially closed the case, ruling Kim's death a suicide accomplished without outside assistance. The decision was based on comprehensive forensic analysis that found no concrete evidence of foul play. The reconstruction experiments demonstrated the theoretical feasibility of self-crucifixion, and all physical evidence collected from the scene pointed to Kim acting alone. Investigators found no traces of accomplice involvement.
