= San Pedro Cutud Lenten Rites =

Annual religious ritual event in the Philippines

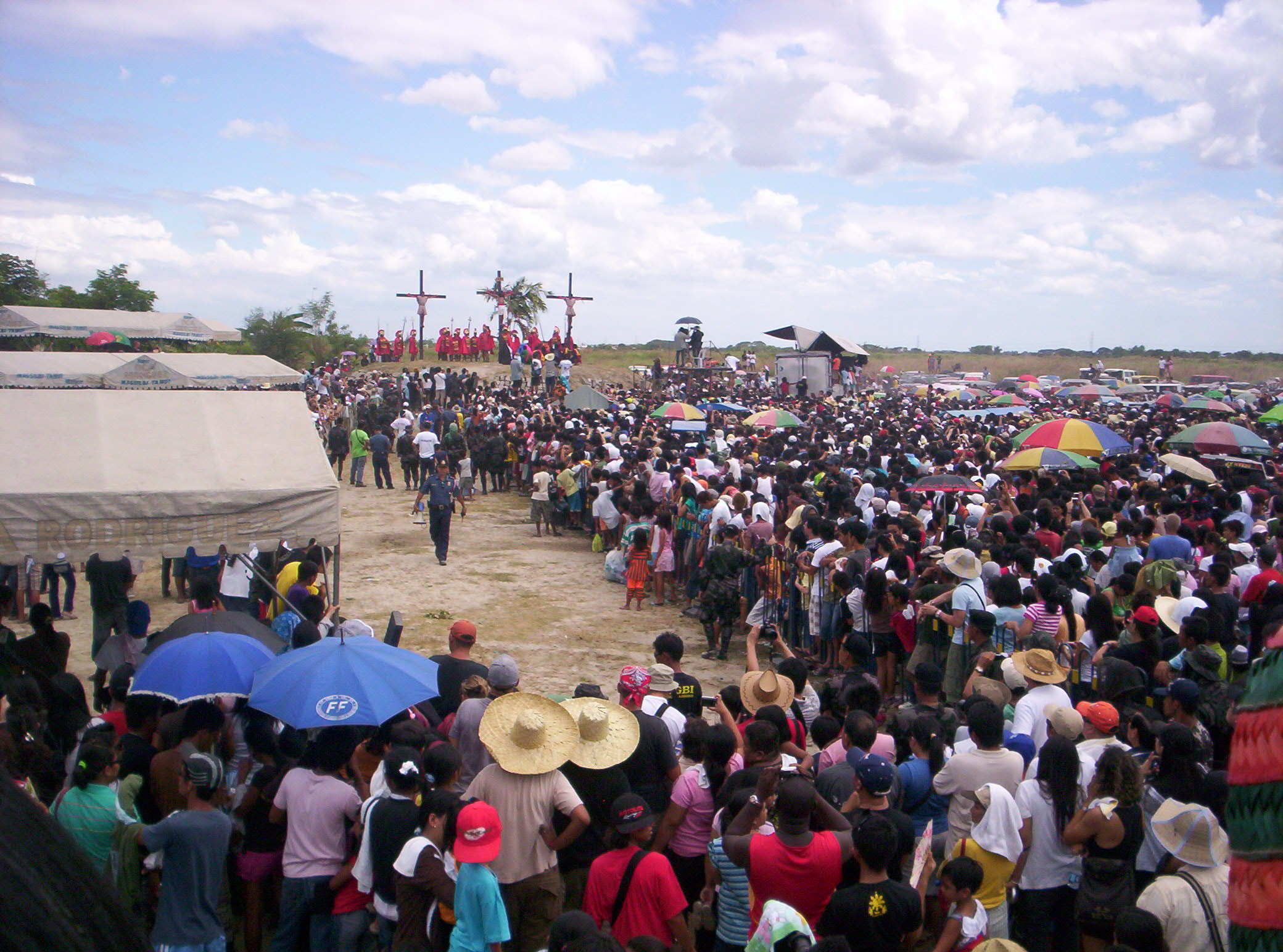
San Pedro Cutud Lenten Rites in San Fernando, Pampanga. There are three crosses with nailed men on the top of the hill with spectators, both local and foreigners, watching them.

The San Pedro Cutud Lenten Rites is a Holy Week re-enactment of Christ's Passion and Death which takes place in Barangay San Pedro Cutud, San Fernando, Pampanga, in the Philippines.

It includes a passion play culminating with the actual nailing of at least three penitents to a wooden cross atop the makeshift Calvary in imitation of the crucifixion of Jesus.

== Events ==
Every year on Good Friday or the Friday before Easter a dozen or so penitents—mostly men but with the occasional woman—are taken to a rice field in the barrio of San Pedro Cutud, 3 km (2 miles) from the proper of City of San Fernando, Pampanga, and nailed to a cross using two-inch (5 cm) stainless steel nails that have been soaked in alcohol to disinfect them. The penitents are taken down when they feel cleansed of their sin. Other penitents flagellate themselves using bamboo sticks tied to a rope.

== UNESCO Intangible Cultural Heritage ==
The "Cutud Lenten Rites" has been registered in the Intangible Cultural Heritage Inventory of the Philippines called 'Pinagmulan.' The move was initiated by the National Commission for Culture and the Arts, the main cultural agency of the Republic of the Philippines. The rites may be nominated for inclusion in the UNESCO Intangible Cultural Heritage Lists, where three other Philippine intangible heritages have already been inscribed.

== See also ==
- Ruben Enaje
- Moriones Festival
- Giant Lantern Festival
- San Fernando, Pampanga
