= Cerreto Sannita =

Comune in Campania, Italy

- Comune
- Comune di Cerreto Sannita
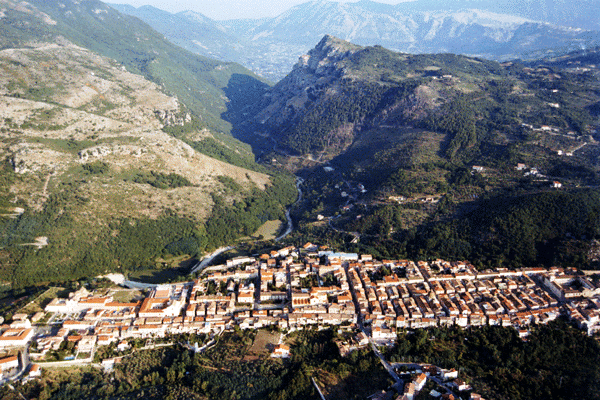

- Location within Italy Location within Campania
- Coordinates: 41°17′N 14°33′E
- Country: Italy
- Region: Campania
- Province: Benevento (BN)

Government
  - Mayor: Giovanni Parente

Area
  - Total: 33.35 km^{2} (12.88 sq mi)
- Elevation: 277 m (909 ft)

Population (30 November 2024)
  - Total: 3,539
  - Density: 106.1/km^{2} (274.8/sq mi)
- Demonym: Cerretesi
- Time zone: UTC+1 (CET)
  - Summer (DST): UTC+2 (CEST)
- Postal code: 82032
- Dialing code: 0824
- ISTAT code: 062023
- Patron saint: Anthony of Padua
- Saint day: 13 June
- Website: www.comune.cerretosannita.bn.it

Cerreto Sannita (IPA: [ʧerˈretosanˈnita], Cerrìte in the Cerretese dialect, IPA: [tʃə'rːitə]) is an Italian comune with a population of 3,539 inhabitants located in the Province of Benevento in the Campania region.

Originally a fief of the Sanframondo family from 1151 to 1460, it passed to the Carafa family in 1483. In the 17th century, it became the seat of the bishops of the Telese diocese, which in 1986 evolved into the Diocese of Cerreto Sannita-Telese-Sant'Agata de' Goti. In 1737, the town rebelled against the Carafa counts due to the oppressive police regime imposed on the people of Cerreto and the burdensome taxes that were crippling the local woolen cloth industry. The Carafa family dispatched 120 mercenaries to suppress the uprising, resulting in widespread violence and arbitrary imprisonments. It was only through the intervention of King Charles III of Spain that legality was restored, allowing the people of Cerreto to achieve initial judicial victories, though the once-prosperous wool industry, a source of wealth for centuries, had by then fallen into irreversible decline.

The town, renowned for its centuries-old tradition of ceramics, features a meticulously planned layout, having been entirely rebuilt following the devastating earthquake of 5 June 1688, which leveled the old Cerreto. The reconstruction was designed by Giovanni Battista Manni under the directive of Count Marzio Carafa and his brother Marino.

== Physical geography ==
=== Territory ===
The historic center of Cerreto Sannita is perched on a squat hill in the upper valley of the Titerno River, surrounded by the Turio and Cappuccino streams, near the gateway to the Matese Regional Park. The municipality spans an area of 33.3 km^{2} (12.9 sq mi). Before the Unification of Italy, its territory was significantly larger, encompassing the two casali (frazioni) of Civitella Licinio and San Lorenzello, the former now a hamlet of Cusano Mutri and the latter an independent municipality.

The municipal territory, predominantly hilly, is framed from west to east by several elevations at the foothills of the Matese massif. To the west lies Monte Erbano, reaching a maximum altitude of 1,385 meters, and to the northwest, Monte Cigno rises to 675 meters, separated by the course of the Titerno stream. To the north stands Mont'Alto, while to the northeast, Monte Coppe reaches approximately 1,200 meters.

==== Hydrography ====
The waterways traversing the municipality are primarily torrential in nature. Known locally as valloni (ravines), they include:

- The Titerno stream, originating in Pietraroja, flows through a narrow limestone gorge between Monte Erbano and Monte Cigno before reaching Cerreto Sannita. In the 18th century, clay extracted from its banks was used by local ceramists to craft their wares;
- The Turio stream, rising near the Madonna della Libera locality, briefly runs underground before washing the western edge of the town and merging with the Titerno;
- The Cappuccini stream, originating near Monte Coppe, is named for its proximity to the Sanctuary of the Madonna delle Grazie, maintained by the Capuchin Fathers;
- The Selvatico stream, so-called because in past centuries it frequently overflowed during heavy rainfall, flooding surrounding lands. In some 17th-century documents, it is referred to as the "Vagno stream".

=== Climate ===
Cerreto Sannita falls within climate zone D, permitting the operation of heating systems from November 1 to April 15 for up to 14 hours daily, per Presidential Decree No. 412 of 26 August 1993.

The climate is characteristically Mediterranean, with relatively harsh winters and hot, humid summers. The surrounding mountains shield the town from strong winds, but its proximity to the Matese massif results in snowfall during colder months. Historically, water rationing has been required during summer droughts.

- Climate classification of Cerreto Sannita
  - Climate zone: D
  - Degree days: 1574

== History ==
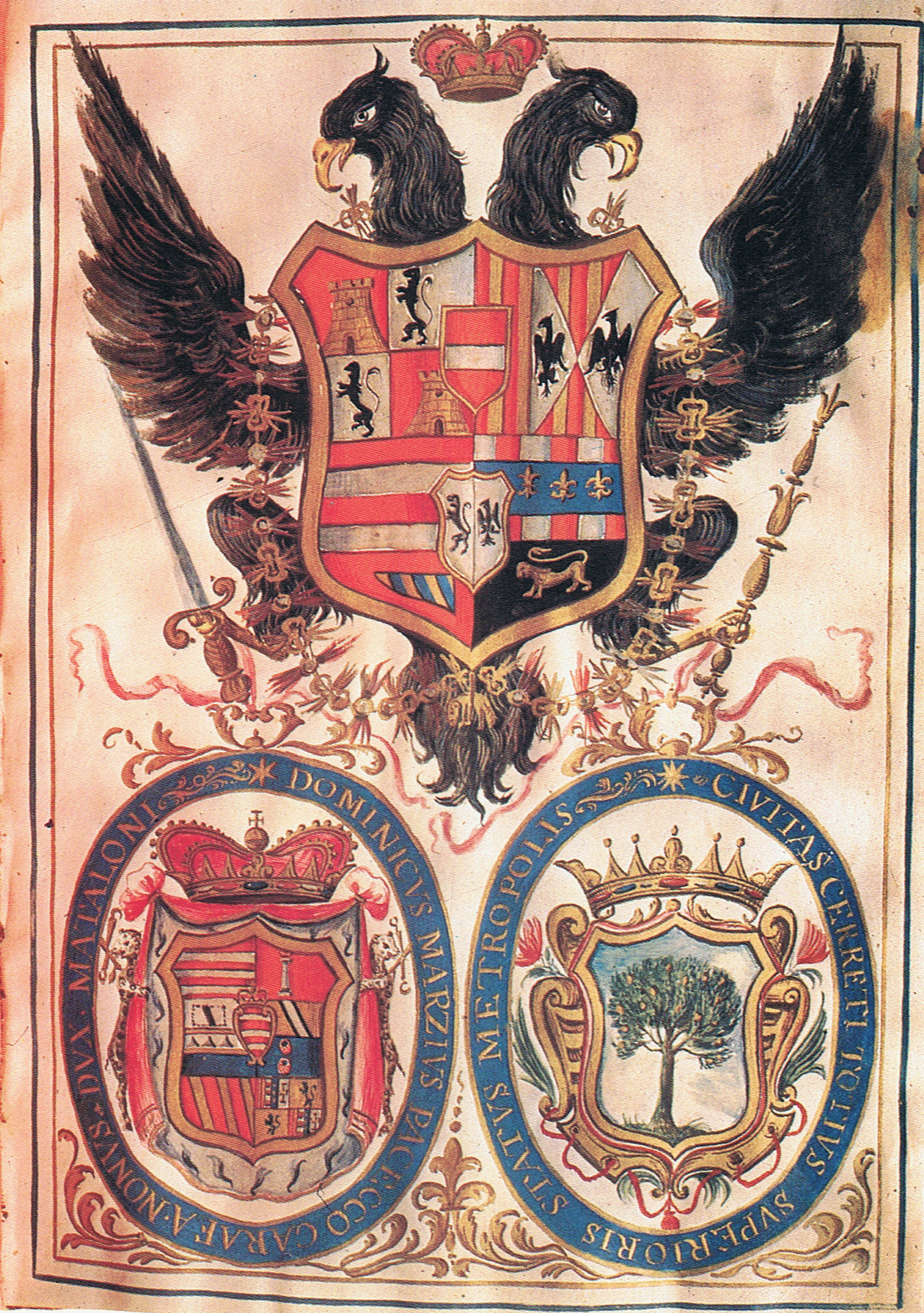
The Spanish coat of arms of Charles V, alongside those of the Carafa counts and the Universitas of Cerreto, from a copy of the 1541 Statutes

=== Antiquity ===
The territory of Cerreto Sannita has been inhabited since prehistory, as evidenced by late 19th-century archaeological excavations near the Morgia Sant'Angelo, also known as the "Leonessa". Near the "Leonessa", a Neolithic ceramic kiln was uncovered, attesting to the millennia-old tradition of clay manipulation in the region. During the Samnite-Roman period, a settlement named Cominium Cerritum (or Cominium Ocritum) is documented, potentially located near the present-day Church of the Madonna della Libera, where remnants of the Temple of Flora are visible.

=== The "Old" Cerreto ===
The earliest written mention of Cerreto appears in a 10th-century imperial diploma. In 972, Emperor Otto II confirmed the possession of the Church of San Martino in Cerreto to Abbot Gregorio of Santa Sofia in Benevento. This grant was later ratified by Emperors Henry II in 1022, Conrad II in 1038, and Pope Gregory VII in 1088.

The gradual decline of the nearby city of Telesia, particularly following the catastrophic earthquake of 1349, elevated Cerreto's economic, commercial, and demographic significance. The 1349 quake devastated the Telesian region, unleashing noxious mofette (sulfurous emissions). Survivors, fleeing malaria and other deadly diseases, relocated to nearby centers such as Cerreto, Solopaca, and San Salvatore Telesino. The bishops also abandoned Telesia, wandering the diocese until they settled in old Cerreto in the 16th century.

From the 15th century, Cerreto experienced significant economic growth driven by a flourishing wool "industry" and trade. Wealthy families and confraternities owned thousands of livestock, herded in winter via the transhumance routes to Puglia's milder climate. Wool processing took place in Cerreto, with weaving done in homes and fulling, carding, and dyeing conducted in specialized workshops. Historian Di Stefano estimated the total livestock owned by the people of Cerreto at 200,000 head.

=== The earthquake of June 5, 1688 and reconstruction ===
The earthquake of June 5, 1688 wiped out Old Cerreto and a large part of the Sannio region. Marino Carafa, brother of Count Marzio, arrived days later with physicians, food, and supplies. Digging through the rubble with his own hands, he consulted multiple engineering experts and resolved to rebuild the town further down the valley on more stable ground. The chosen site was a broad, squat hill flanked by the Turio and Cappuccini streams and bisected north to south by the ancient Via Telesina, linking old Cerreto to Telesia.

Reconstruction began immediately after the blocks were laid out, likely by the royal engineer Giovanni Battista Manni, who also assessed the value of requisitioned private lands. The rebuilding progressed swiftly; by 1696, just eight years after the quake, every resident had constructed a new home.

The reconstruction attracted numerous artisans, particularly from Naples, lured by tax exemptions for newcomers outlined in the 1541 municipal Statutes. Among them was master ceramist Nicolò Russo, regarded as the father of Cerreto ceramics. His workshop, soon a thriving "factory," trained the town's most prominent ceramists, including Antonio Giustiniani, father of the renowned Nicola.

=== A gradual decline ===
During the first half of the 18th century, major religious and civic structures were completed. Relations between the people of Cerreto and the Carafa counts soured again due to excessive abuses and heavy taxation. In 1737, following a civic petition against the Carafa, the town was occupied by militias for over a month.

The economic vitality spurred by reconstruction waned over decades. By the late 18th century, the wool industry had collapsed, and with the abolition of feudalism in the early 19th century, Cerreto lost its status as a county seat, becoming part of the expansive district of Piedimonte d'Alife within the Province of Terra di Lavoro. To make matters worse, the 1805 earthquake damaged the lower part of the city.

=== Unification and Cerreto's new role ===
Following Italy's unification, Cerreto native Michele Ungaro was elected the first president of the Provincial Council. Among his initiatives was restoring Cerreto's prominence by proposing and securing its designation as the capital of one of the province's three circondari. This move brought numerous public offices and educational institutions to the town.

Brigandage, which had long been present in the area, increased after the unification with the rise of various bands. The most notorious was led by Cerreto native Cosimo Giordano, responsible for numerous extortions, thefts, kidnappings, and murders. Bounties on brigand leaders, Giordano's frequent absences abroad to launder profits, and local collaboration eroded the band's cohesion. Giordano persisted in his crimes until his arrest in 1882, after which he was sentenced to life at hard labor.

After the brigandage era, Cerreto enjoyed a vibrant social and cultural flourishing akin to the Belle Époque, spanning the late 19th and early 20th centuries. In 1881, the Workers' Cooperative of Cerreto Sannita was founded to provide financial aid and education to local workers. The municipal aqueduct was rebuilt in 1891, the cemetery expanded in 1903, and the power grid completed in 1908, an event celebrated by poet Pietro Paolo Fusco with an ode in the Cerretese dialect. Three banks emerged: the Banca Circondariale del Sannio tied to Giuseppe D'Andrea; the Banca Popolare Cooperativa linked to Antonio Venditti; and the Banca popolare di Cerreto Sannita, backed by priests and Catholics. World War I and the ensuing economic downturn led to the collapse of all three banks, wiping out savings and ushering in a prolonged period of economic, social, and intellectual decline.

=== From Fascism to the present ===
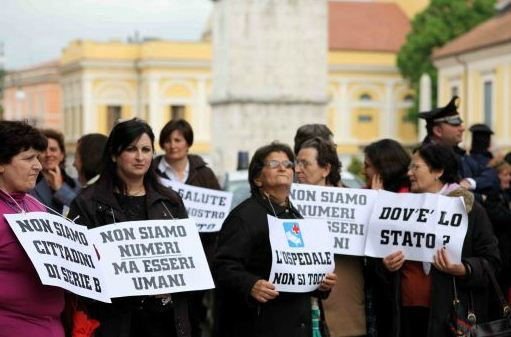
Detail of protests against the repurposing of the Cerreto Sannita hospital (April 2010)

Under the fascist dictatorship, Cerreto experienced relative social calm until 1926, when a mob stormed the municipal headquarters during a session of the democratically elected municipal council. Mayor and notary Domenico Pilella was forced to resign.

World War II left Cerreto with only one civilian casualty, killed in a German reprisal. Far more numerous were the young soldiers who died on the various fronts and whose names are inscribed on the war memorial in Piazza Luigi Sodo. Retreating Germans in 1943 committed thefts, looting, and requisitions, destroying all bridges connecting Cerreto to neighboring towns to hinder the Allied advance.

Post-war, the first provisional administration under engineer Antonio Biondi faced daunting challenges: rampant unemployment, soaring food prices, and severed connections due to demolished bridges. With great effort, bridges like the "Lavello" were rebuilt, completed swiftly in 1946. Over time, Cerreto lost its role as a service hub, established after unification as a circondario capital. The closure or downsizing of institutions (subprefecture, prisons, finance guard, court, hospital, justice of the peace, teaching institute, and linguistic high school) dealt a severe blow to the local economy and demographics. Efforts to promote local handicrafts, especially ceramics, and tourism have not always been able to stem the general crisis that has afflicted much of Sannio's hinterland.

Since 2007, the town has seen numerous protests against the repurposing of the Ospedale Maria delle Grazie, mandated by Regional Law No. 24/2006. Despite demonstrations and appeals, the hospital’s medicine, orthopedics, surgery, and cardiology departments were shuttered and dismantled. By August 2011, the facility was being converted into a "community hospital," hosting only an emergency room and social assistance offices.

== Monuments and places of interest ==
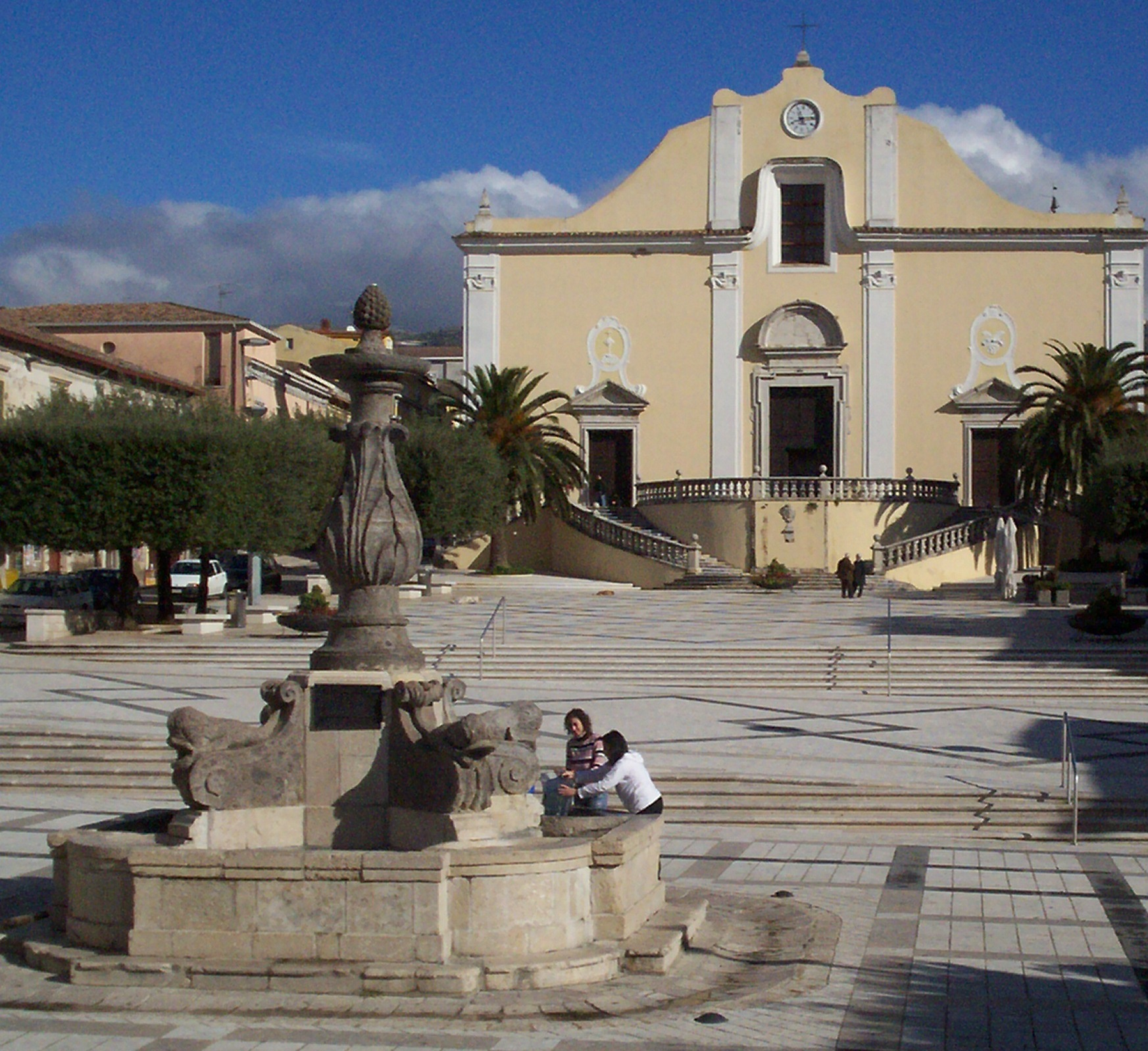
The Collegiate Church of San Martino with the adjacent Fountain of the Dolphins

[...] The 18th century, which elsewhere transformed cities by adding a church here or a palace there, created in Cerreto a complete masterpiece capable of surprising even the most demanding visitor.

— Guido Piovene

=== Religious architecture ===
Cathedral Church
Constructed between 1689 and 1736, the cathedral boasts a facade of finely worked local stone adorned with stucco embellishments, multicolored stained glass windows, and two sturdy bell towers topped with yellow and green majolica tiles. Its interior, designed in a Latin cross layout, features exquisite stucco work by Benedetto Silva and Giacomo Caldarisi. The cathedral houses numerous paintings by Neapolitan and local artists. The presbytery walls display two neoclassical frescoes depicting Jesus Tempted and Jesus Consoled, while the main altar is crowned by a mid-18th-century painting of the Holy Trinity and the Coronation of the Virgin. In the Chapel of the Immaculate Virgin, two 18th-century wooden busts portray Saint Joseph with the Child and Saint Anne with the Virgin. The Chapel of the Sacrament serves as the burial site of the Servant of God Monsignor Luigi Sodo.
Collegiate Church of San Martino Vescovo
Established in 1544 through the merger of six parishes, the collegiate church was rebuilt between 1689 and 1733 based on a design by Giovanni Battista Manni. Its facade features four stone access staircases (two curved and two straight) leading to a semicircular forecourt embedded with a Roman-era sundial. The spacious, luminous interior comprises three naves, adorned with polychrome marble works by the Pagano brothers (1736), numerous 18th-century paintings, ancient Cerreto ceramic floor tiles (in the last chapels on the left), and fine wooden sculptures. The organ, commissioned from Neapolitan master Felice Cimmino in the late 17th century, is richly carved and gilded, facing a walnut pulpit crafted in 1762. Above the main altar hangs the Glory of Saint Martin, a large painting completed by Paolo de Falco in 1714. The Chapel of the Sacrament contains three canvases by Lucantonio D'Onofrio: The Last Supper (1738), The Miracle of Manna in the Desert (1741), and Christ with the Adulteress (1758).
Church of Sant'Antonio di Padova
Attached to the former Convent of the Conventual Friars, this church was halved in size after the earthquake of 26 July 1806 destroyed its transept, dome, and presbytery, which were never rebuilt. In the first chapel on the left, a remarkable 17th-century painted and gilded wooden altarpiece depicts Our Lady of Tears. The painting above the main altar, by Francesco Celebrano from the mid-18th century, includes the Universitas of Cerreto’s coat of arms (the work’s commissioner) and a depiction of the church as it appeared before the 1806 quake. The church also preserves remains of ancient Cerreto ceramic flooring and a remarkable wooden statue of Saint Caratisa, salvaged from the earthquake of June 5, 1688.
Church of Santa Maria di Costantinopoli
Commissioned in 1616 by Capuchin friar Ruffino of Naples, this church was home to one of Cerreto’s wealthiest and most influential confraternities, which also owned the Mount of Piety. A recurring motif is an angel dousing flames over Constantinople, depicted in a stucco medallion on the facade, at the base of Silvestro Jacobelli’s Madonna statue, and in a painting within the nave’s vault. Traces of ancient Cerreto ceramic flooring remain beneath the intricately carved wooden choir. The typically 18th-century stucco wall decorations once framed oval paintings of fine craftsmanship, now lost.

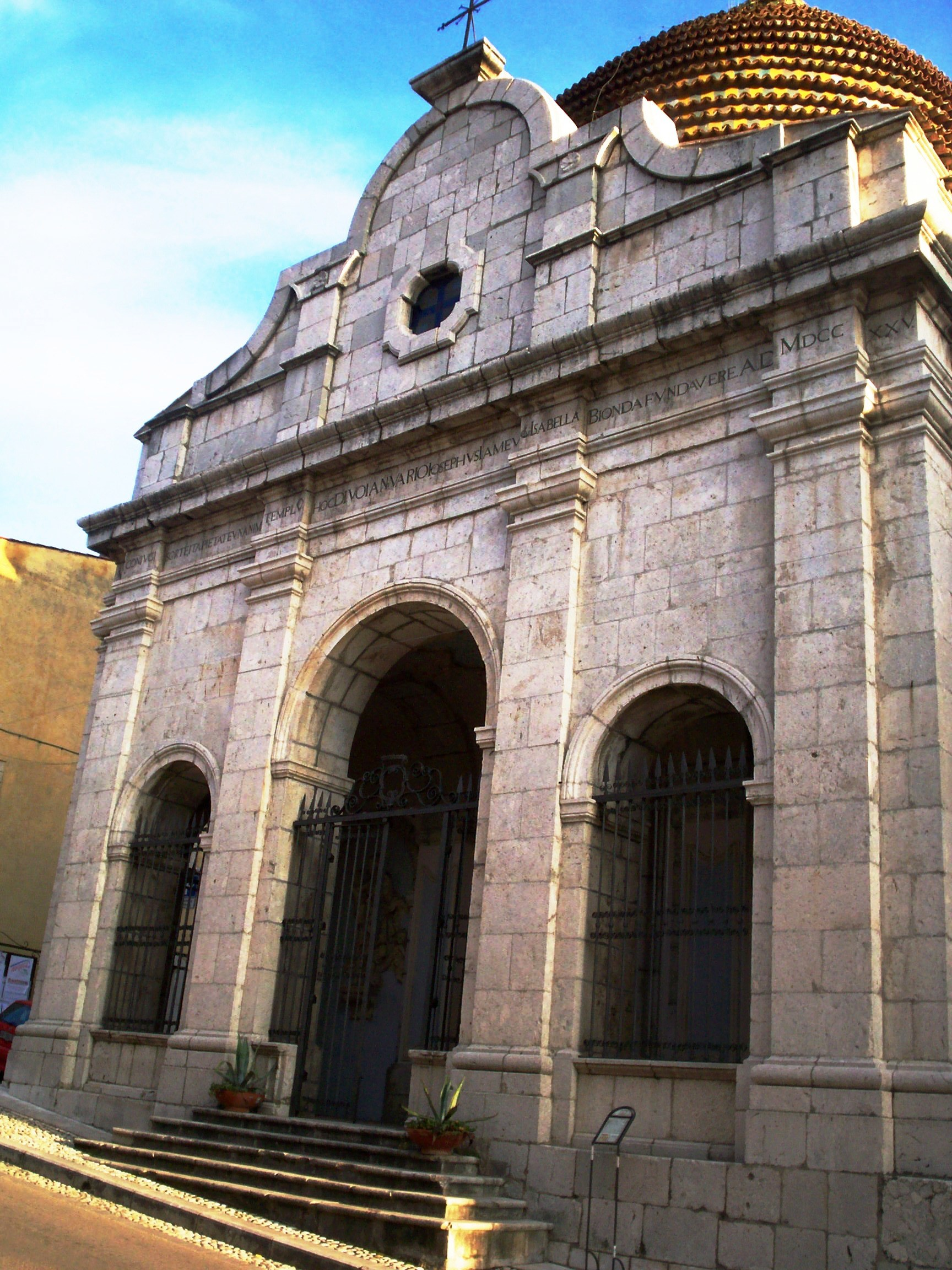
The Church of San Gennaro

Church of Santa Maria del Monte dei Morti
This church features a large local stone portal adorned with a skull, reflecting its unusual name ("Mount of the Dead"). Inside, altars crafted from local marble and patches of ancient Cerreto ceramic flooring are preserved. The presbytery walls bear two 1761 tempera paintings by Mozzilli depicting the Birth of the Virgin and the Presentation at the Temple. Above the main altar stands a wooden statue of the Assumption of the Virgin, venerated on 15 August. The bell tower, clad in yellow and green majolica tiles, incorporates stones repurposed from Old Cerreto.
Church of San Gennaro Vescovo
Built in 1722 at the behest of the Giamei and Biondi families, this temple is distinguished by its tall, stepped dome covered in yellow and green majolica tiles and a pristine facade of local stone. Its elliptical interior houses the Civic Museum of Sacred Art, showcasing valuable religious artifacts, including a finely crafted reliquary-calendar. The original Cerreto ceramic floor beneath the main altar’s predella, created by Nicolò Russo around 1730, features rich floral and ornithological designs. The 18th-century stucco work is by Caldarisi and Borrelli, complemented by four intricately carved walnut doors.
Church of San Rocco
Expanded after the 1656 plague and again in the mid-18th century, it houses several wooden sculptures, notably Our Lady of Providence by Silvestro Jacobelli from the mid-18th century. The sacristy preserves two fine 18th-century paintings. A door in the nave leads to a crypt-burial site, reflecting the historical practice of interring the dead within churches. The crypt’s chambers feature "chair" and "bed" burial styles, some "connole" (coffins), and a vat used to prepare quicklime for the treatment of the deceased.
Former Monastery of the Poor Clares
Founded in 1369 by Francesca Sanframondi, this monastery has been home to the Sisters of the Good and Perpetual Help since the 20th century. The entrance hall contains the tomb of the first abbess, Caterina Sanframondi, adorned with the Angevin and Sanframondi family crests. The well-preserved church features 18th-century paintings framed by rich stucco work by Calise (1705). Gilded wooden grilles above the cornice allowed the cloistered nuns to attend services unseen. The expansive inner pronaos houses one of the largest and best-preserved examples of ancient Cerreto ceramic flooring.
Confraternity of Our Lady of Tears
Originally attached to the church of Sant'Antonio, it has a single nave ending in a presbytery surmounted by a dome frescoed in the 18th century. The building is used for cultural events.
Church of San Giuseppe
Built by wool merchant Giuseppe Ciaburro, it has served as a carpentry workshop since 1970. Its unique Cerreto ceramic floor, distinguished by its colors and shapes, and its stucco decorations are key attractions. Paintings once housed here have been relocated to the Civic Museum of Sacred Art.

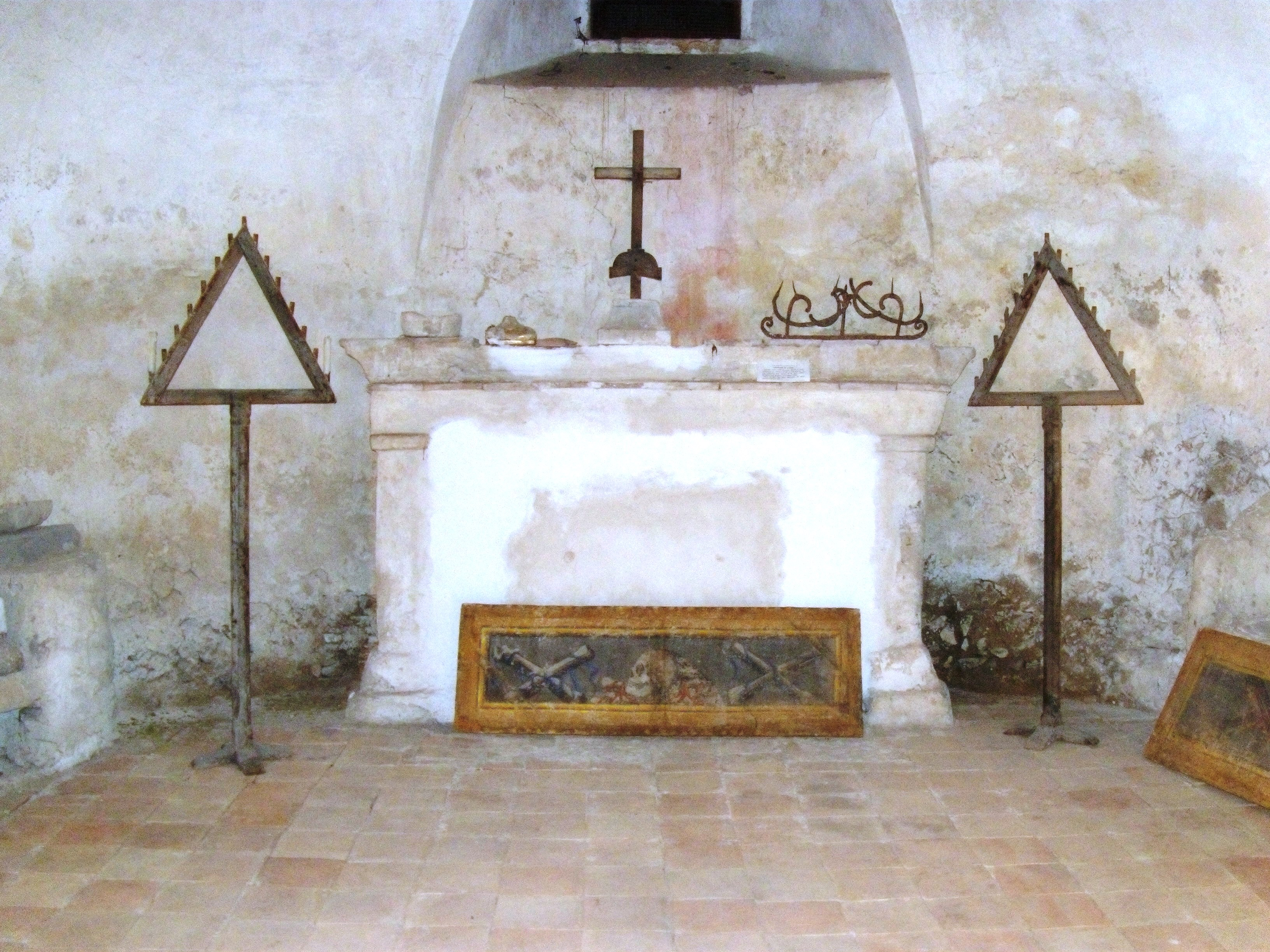
A chamber in the crypt-burial site beneath the Church of San Rocco

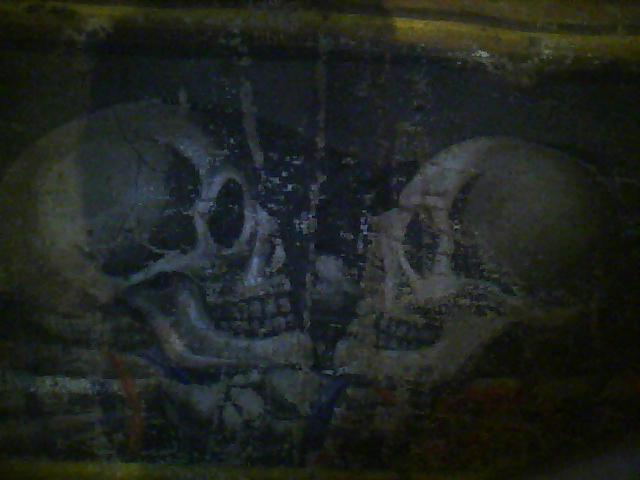
A detail of an 18th-century painted panel in the same crypt

Sanctuary of the Madonna delle Grazie
Completed in 1588 and expanded over the centuries, its neo-Gothic chapel houses a Madonna statue commissioned in Naples by the guardian friar at the request of survivors of the 1730 famine. Behind the main altar is a 17th-century wooden panel crafted by the friars. Several 18th-century works attributed to Francesco Celebrano are also on display.
Church of the Madonna del Carmine
Begun in 1610 and restored in 2003 after decades of neglect, its interior features a steeply sloped nave and several tombstones with Latin inscriptions. The central chapel retains traces of ancient frescoes.
Church of the Madonna della Libera
Erected on the ruins of a Samnite temple and rebuilt multiple times, it contains various wooden sculptures. The statue of Our Lady of Liberty is a focal point of veneration in July.
Church of San Giovanni Battista
A small religious structure perched on a rock overlooking the Turio stream, it survived the 1688 earthquake and houses an ancient painting. The church and its adjacent bridge are tied to the legend of "'Nzilla".
Church of Sant'Anna
Located in the namesake district, 17th-century records indicate it was originally dedicated to Our Lady of Loreto due to an effigy of the "B.M.V. di Loreto" on its sole altar. The main altar now holds a wooden statue of Saint Anne with the Virgin, depicting Saint Anne gazing into the eyes of the young Virgin Mary, shown with hands clasped in prayer.
Church of the Madonna del Soccorso
Built along the route from old Cerreto to Puglia, it was frequented by shepherds and wool merchants. Local tradition holds that a wealthy merchant, surviving a fall from his horse after invoking "Virgin, help me," founded the church. A 17th-18th-century wooden altarpiece, once in the rear wall, is now in the Collegiate Church of San Martino. Declared unusable after damage caused by earthquakes on December 29, 2013 and January 20, 2014.

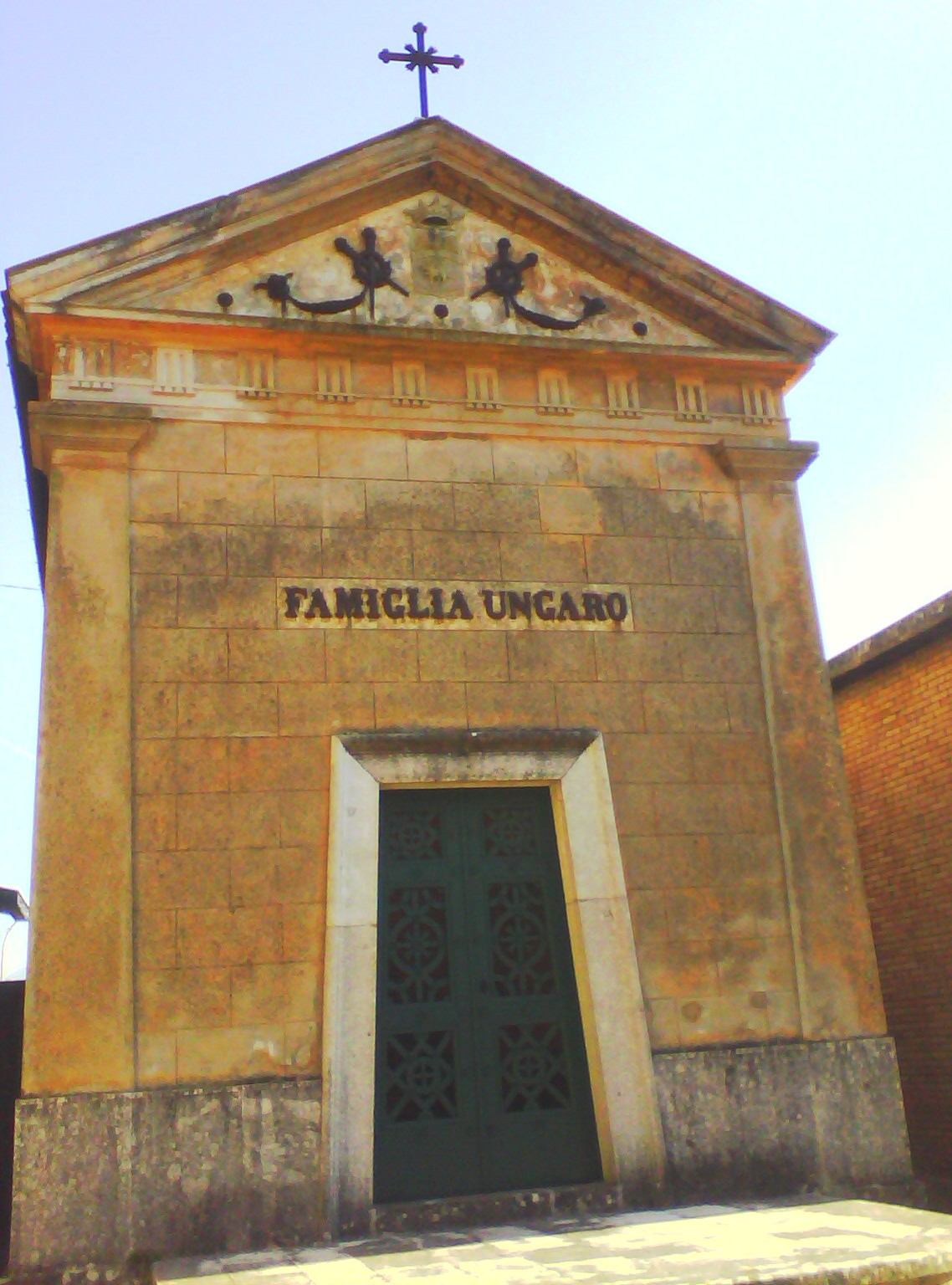
The Ungaro family cemetery chapel, where Bishop Luigi Sodo’s remains were kept from 1895 to 1910.

Church of Sant'Onofrio
Founded around 1530 by Antonio Magnati in the "Campo chiaro" locality on his land along the ancient Via Telesina connecting Old Cerreto to Telesia. It originally featured a single altar with a painting of Saint Onuphrius, flanked by Saint Mary and Saint James on the left, and Saint Francis and Saint Leonard on the right.

==== Municipal Cemetery ====
The earliest record of Cerreto Sannita’s cemetery dates to 1833, when the intendant of Terra di Lavoro urged the local decurionate to resume construction of the "Campo Santo." The letter recommended inhumation over entombment for cost efficiency. The municipal administration replied that work, begun in 1830, had stalled due to funding shortages, and they favored entombment because the chosen site’s "irregular, clayey, and rocky" soil was unsuitable for burials. The site was near the ruins of Old Cerreto.

Despite this correspondence, construction did not proceed, and the deceased continued to be buried in churches. In 1851, the burial area beneath the Church of Santa Maria required expansion. Only in 1852, spurred by public outcry, did the decurionate begin the construction of a cemetery after purchasing land near the border with San Lorenzello. Progress was slow, hampered by San Lorenzello’s jurisdictional objections.

In 1868, the cemetery was divided into eight equal sections for the confraternities of Santa Maria, San Rocco, Sant’Antonio, and the Madonna di Costantinopoli, the chapters of the Cathedral and Collegiate Church of San Martino, with two sections reserved for "poor non-members" and the unbaptized.

Located along the Telese Terme-Cerreto Sannita provincial road, the cemetery preserves several 19th-century family chapels. Damage from the 2013 and 2014 earthquakes rendered some chapels unusable.

=== Civic architecture ===
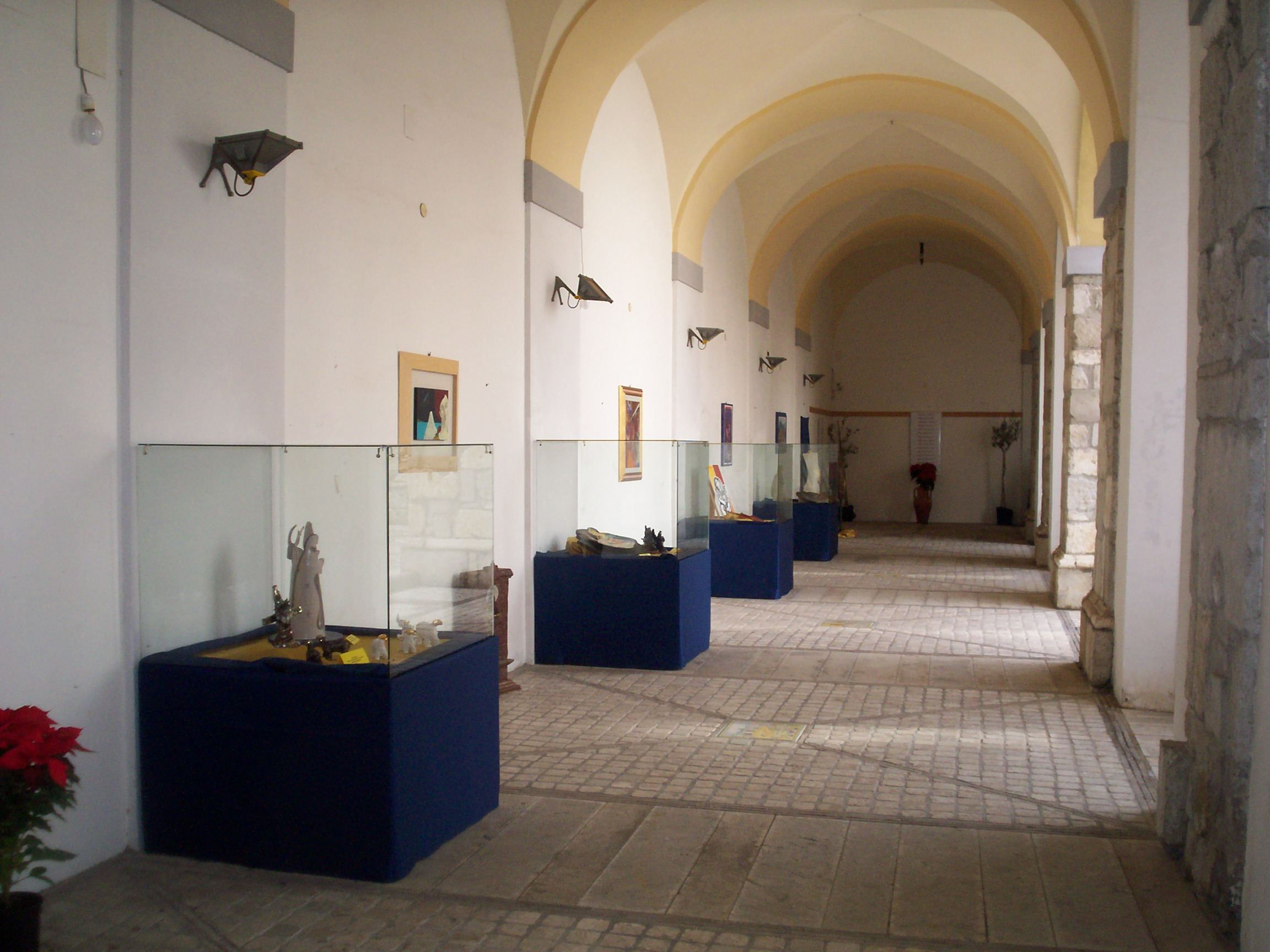
Detail of the cloister of Palazzo Sant'Antonio.

Palazzo Sant'Antonio
Formerly a Franciscan convent, it now houses municipal offices and the Civic Museum and Ceramics Museum of Cerreto. The cloister’s pavement features 23 majolica panels illustrating Cerreto’s history, traditions, and landmarks.
Palazzo del Genio
Originally the seat of the Universitas, it earned its name from a theater dedicated to the Italic Genius once located within. It currently hosts the municipal library and cultural events.
Feudal Prisons
Completed in 1711 and operational until 1960, this building now hosts the contemporary ceramic art section of the Civic Museum, displaying works by leading Italian ceramists since 1998. A cell below the stairs contains inscriptions by prisoners.
Ducal Tavern
Built around 1720 to lodge and refresh travelers, its main portal bears the coat of arms of Carlotta Colonna, wife of Count Carlo Carafa. After Carlo’s death in 1717, Carlotta governed the fief until 1724, overseeing the tavern’s construction. The crest combines the Carafa and Colonna family emblems.
Episcopal Palace
Completed in 1696, it is an example of the typical palace architecture of Cerreto, with an entrance hall, a courtyard and a back garden. The upper floor, residence of the Bishop of Cerreto, Telese, and Sant’Agata, features a painting attributed to Luca Giordano in the hall of coats of arms.
Mount of Piety
A neoclassical building, it served as a charitable pawn institution until the early 20th century. The first floor houses a wall safe with 18th-century stucco decorations. After hosting a rural culture exhibition, it now serves as a hub for local associations.

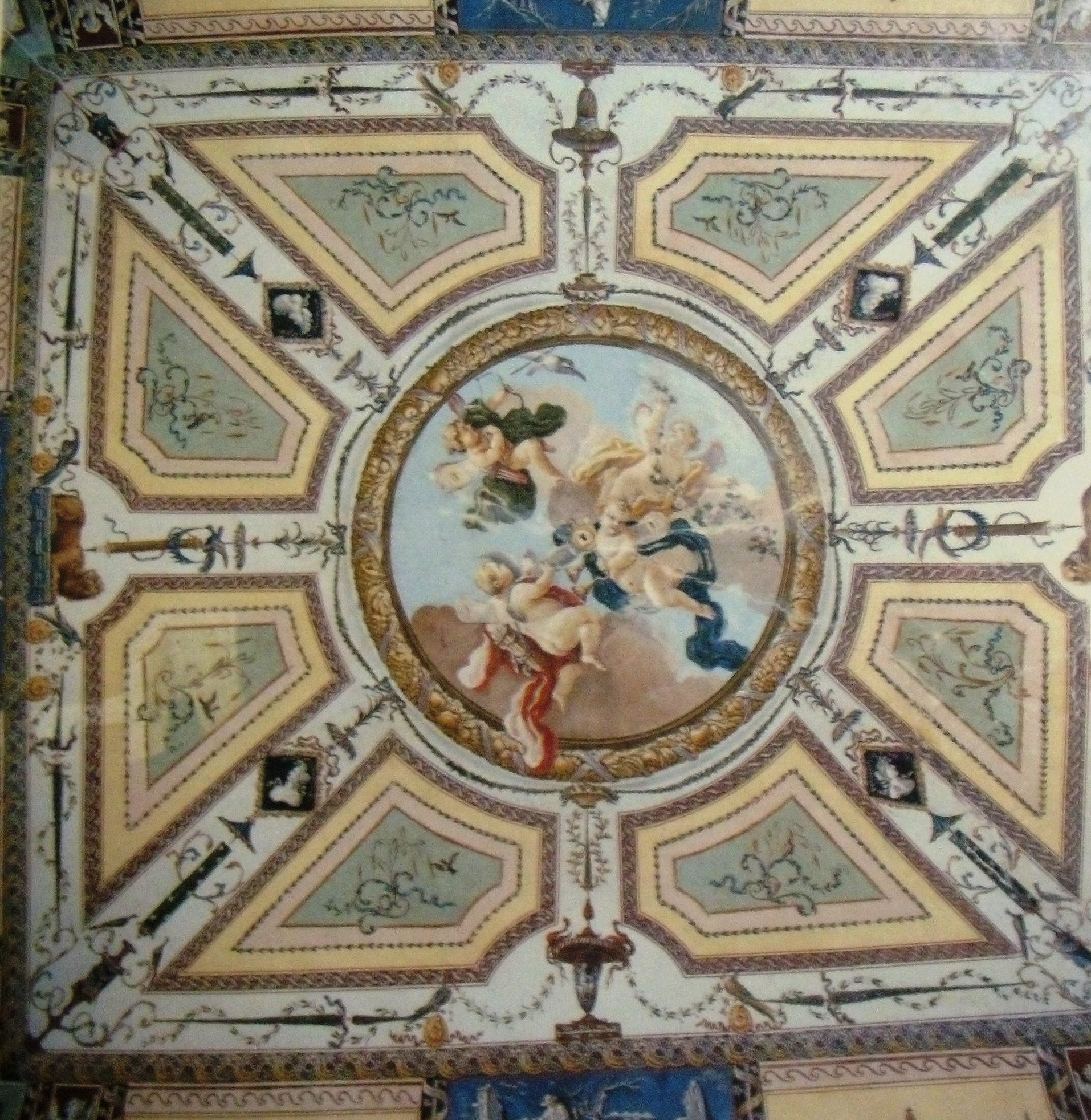
Frescoed room by Francesco Celebrano in Palazzo Ungaro

Palazzo Giuseppe Ciaburro
Erected by wealthy wool merchants, it has housed the Titerno Mountain Community since 1995. It has an ornate stone portal with alternating pillared bosses. The remains of a loggia facing the garden are notable remnants of the original design.
Palazzo Ungaro
Divided among multiple owners since 1960, this palace was the longtime residence of the prominent Ungaro family. The noble floor features rooms frescoed with grotesques, cherubs, and Rococo motifs by Neapolitan artist Francesco Celebrano.
Palazzo del Viceconte
Named because it briefly housed the vicecount or governor, an official appointed by Carafa to administer the fief from Naples. Its exterior features a portal with diamond-shaped bosses and a roughcast facade.
Palazzo Magnati
Owned by the Altieri family, it was used for filming in the 1950s. A double staircase leads from the courtyard to a spacious frescoed loggia overlooking a large rear garden.
Palazzo Nardella
Distinctive for the gray tuff monograms that line the cornice of the part of the facade spared by the 1970s renovations. It was also used as a filming location in the 1950s.
Diocesan Seminary of Cerreto Sannita
Expanded over the centuries, it houses a library of over 10,000 volumes, including many 16th century texts. Since 1938 it has housed the Parochial Classical Lyceum "Luigi Sodo".
Palazzo Giordani
Characterized by its elegant 18th-century facade, curved iron balcony railings with torch holders, pillared stone portal, and roughcast decoration.

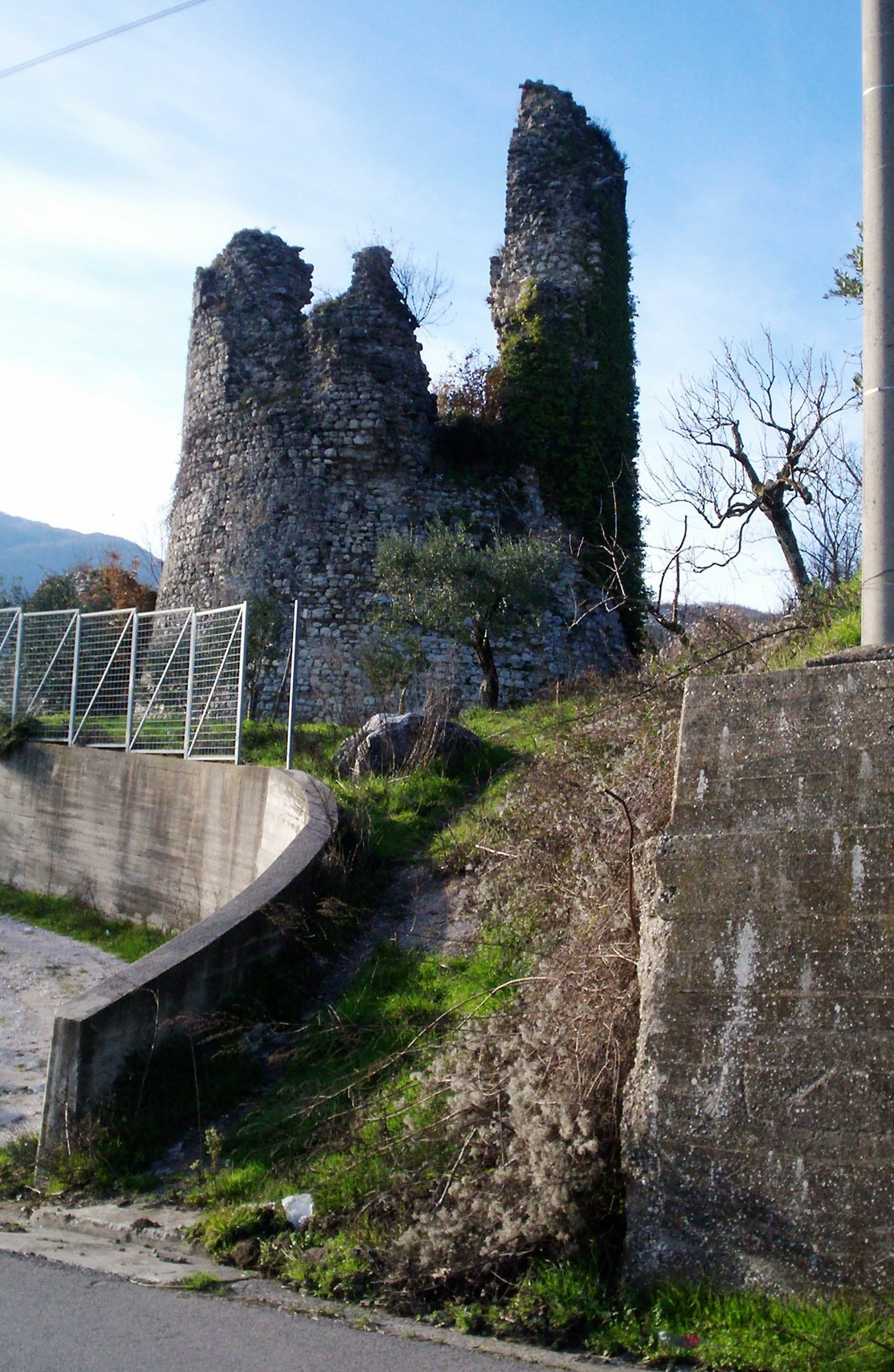
Tower of Old Cerreto

Palazzo Carizza
Its highlight is a portal with pillow bosses framing an intricately carved wooden grille with a cherub with branching floral motifs, typical of the 18th century.
Palazzo Ciaburro
Since 2005, it has housed the B3 Social District offices. It retains 18th-century stucco work, a molded stone portal, and traces of interior wall decorations.
Villa Langer
Originally a rural farmhouse on the southern outskirts, it was expanded in the 18th century by wool merchant Andrea Salvatore. In 1823, his nephew, poet and patriot Andrea Mazzarella, died there.

=== Other ===
==== Fountains ====
The territory features several fountains. In Piazza San Martino, the Fountain of the Dolphins, purchased in Naples in 1812, is said to be the famous fountain from which Masaniello addressed crowds in Naples’ Piazza Mercato. In the Coste locality, the Monsignore Fountain was rebuilt in the 1940s using worked stones from Palazzo Ungaro. The Tintoria Ducale Fountain in Tinta features two carved stone masks spouting water. Additional fountains with stone masks are located in Sant’Anna, Madonna delle Grazie, and Madonna della Libera.

==== Monuments ====
In Piazza Luigi Sodo stands the monument to the fallen of all wars, remade in its current form in 1960 after the original was melted down to make ammunition during the Second World War. Nearby is a mobile cannon used by the Italian Army in the last conflict. Until summer 2009, Piazza Roma hosted the Madonna delle Grazie monument, erected post-war. In front of the Carabinieri barracks, a monument to the Carabinieri is carved into local stone by master ceramist Francesco Grillo.

=== Archaeological sites ===
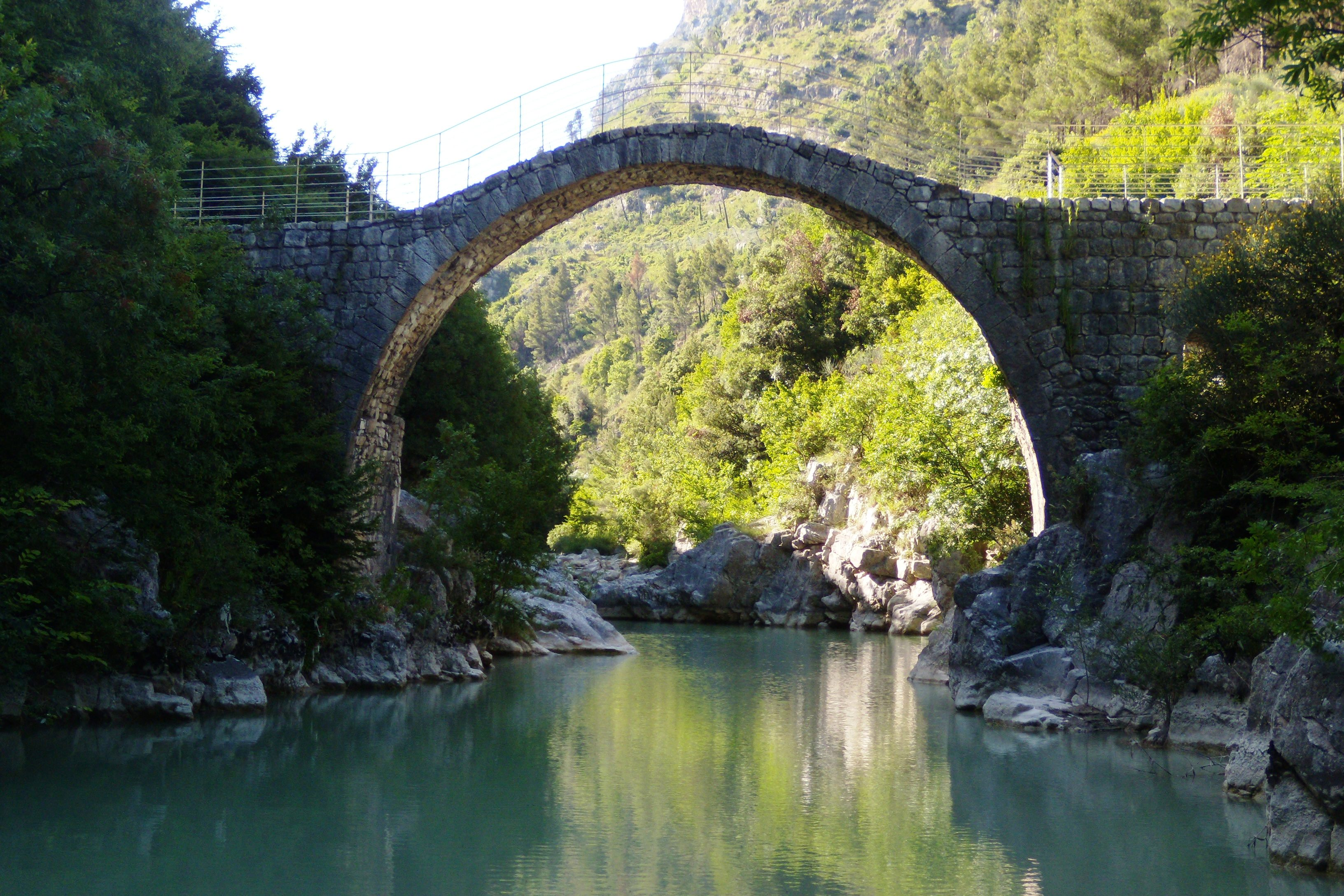
View of the Hannibal’s Bridge

Old Cerreto
Of old Cerreto (destroyed in the 1688 earthquake), few ruins remain, including the Torrione, a former prison tower. Other traces are in the San Giovanni locality. In 2010, the municipality acquired the Torrione to establish an archaeological park and excavate further remnants.
Hannibal’s Bridge
Legend claims this ancient bridge, built entirely of local stone with a single round arch over the Titerno River, was crossed by the Carthaginian general during the Second Punic War. Accessible via the Cerreto-Cusano provincial road, it is marked by an iron elephant monument.
Temple of Flora
Only the base and scattered stone elements, like columns and capitals, remain of this Samnite-Roman temple dedicated to Flora. Some base blocks were reused in the 18th century for a nearby fountain.
Tintoria Ducale
One of many wool-processing workshops, this dye house, comprising multiple rooms, underwent restoration in 2011 after decades of neglect and thefts of stone materials. Another industrial archaeology site is the "Molino Di Paola," accessible from Via Molino off Via Michele Ungaro.

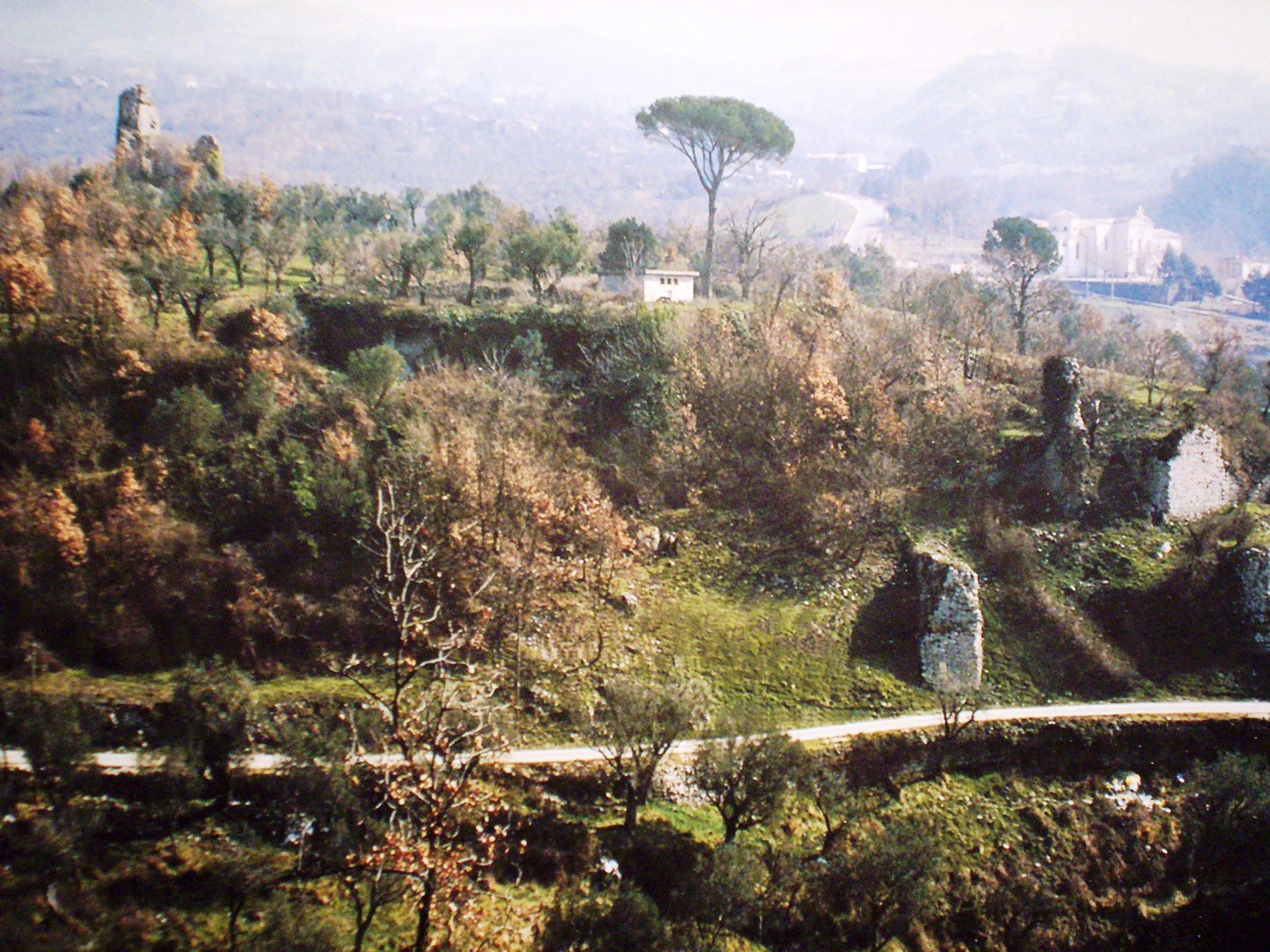
Hill with the ruins of old Cerreto, destroyed by the 1688 earthquake

Cartoniera Ducale
This carding workshop operated in both old and new Cerreto during the county’s prosperous pastoral economy.

=== Natural areas ===
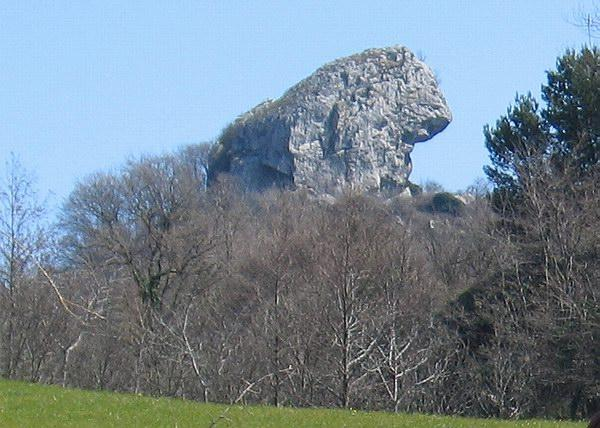
The Morgia Sant'Angelo or "Leonessa"

Morgia Sant'Angelo or "Leonessa"
A limestone block resembling a feline, the Leonessa contains a cave inhabited during the Neolithic period and later converted into a church by the Longobards. Its striking cat-like form, visible from afar, results from millennia of physical, chemical, and mechanical erosion. In the "Cese" district, unusual erosion patterns in limestone are common, as seen in the nearby "Ripe del Corvo" rock complex.
Forre del Titerno
These small canyons, carved by millennia of water erosion, reach depths of up to 30 meters and widths of about 15 meters.
Grotta Chiusa or Brigands’ Cave
Also known as the "closed cave," it was explored on 6 August 1935 by speleologists led by Professors Umberto Franco and Silvestro Mastrobuoni. Its challenging entrance leads to chambers rich with stalactites and stalagmites, culminating in the "cathedral," a majestic 20-meter-high space.
Cascata Vallantica and Grotta Cupa
In the Raone locality, north of Madonna della Libera, a trail leads to the Vallantica bridge and waterfall, approximately 50 meters high. Upstream near Monte Alto’s summit lies the Grotta Cupa, a narrow cave several meters long and 1.5 meters wide, formed by the tilt of two large rocks.

== Society ==
=== Demographic evolution ===
Historical population development prior to 1861
| Year | Population |
|---|---|
| 1597 | 7,000 |
| 1611 | 8,000 |
| 1655 | 9,000 |
| 1663 | 8,000 |
| 1741 | 4,077 |
| 1792 | 4,481 |

The demographic evolution of Cerreto Sannita from 1861 to 2001 is as follows:

Historical population

| Year | Pop. | ±% |
|---|---|---|
| 1861 | 4,922 | — |
| 1871 | 6,159 | +25.1% |
| 1881 | 5,265 | −14.5% |
| 1901 | 5,593 | +6.2% |
| 1911 | 5,018 | −10.3% |
| 1921 | 5,123 | +2.1% |
| 1931 | 5,119 | −0.1% |
| 1936 | 5,332 | +4.2% |

| Year | Pop. | ±% |
|---|---|---|
| 1951 | 5,675 | +6.4% |
| 1961 | 5,362 | −5.5% |
| 1971 | 4,697 | −12.4% |
| 1981 | 4,339 | −7.6% |
| 1991 | 4,468 | +3.0% |
| 2001 | 4,197 | −6.1% |
| 2011 | 4,083 | −2.7% |
| 2021 | 3,630 | −11.1% |

Source: ISTAT

In the early 17th century, the population peaked at around 9,100, dropping to 8,000 after the plague of 1656 and to 4,000 after the earthquake of June 5, 1688.

As of 31 December 2009, the population stood at 4,209 across 1,590 families and 4 cohabitations, with an average household size of 2.63.

The average age is 43.4 years, with a birth rate of 6.6%.

=== Ethnicities and foreign minorities ===
Regular foreign residents constitute 1.9% of the total population. As of 31 December 2009, 82 foreign nationals (33 males, 49 females) resided in the municipality, with the largest group being Romanians (46 individuals), followed by Ukrainians (13 individuals).

=== Languages and dialects ===
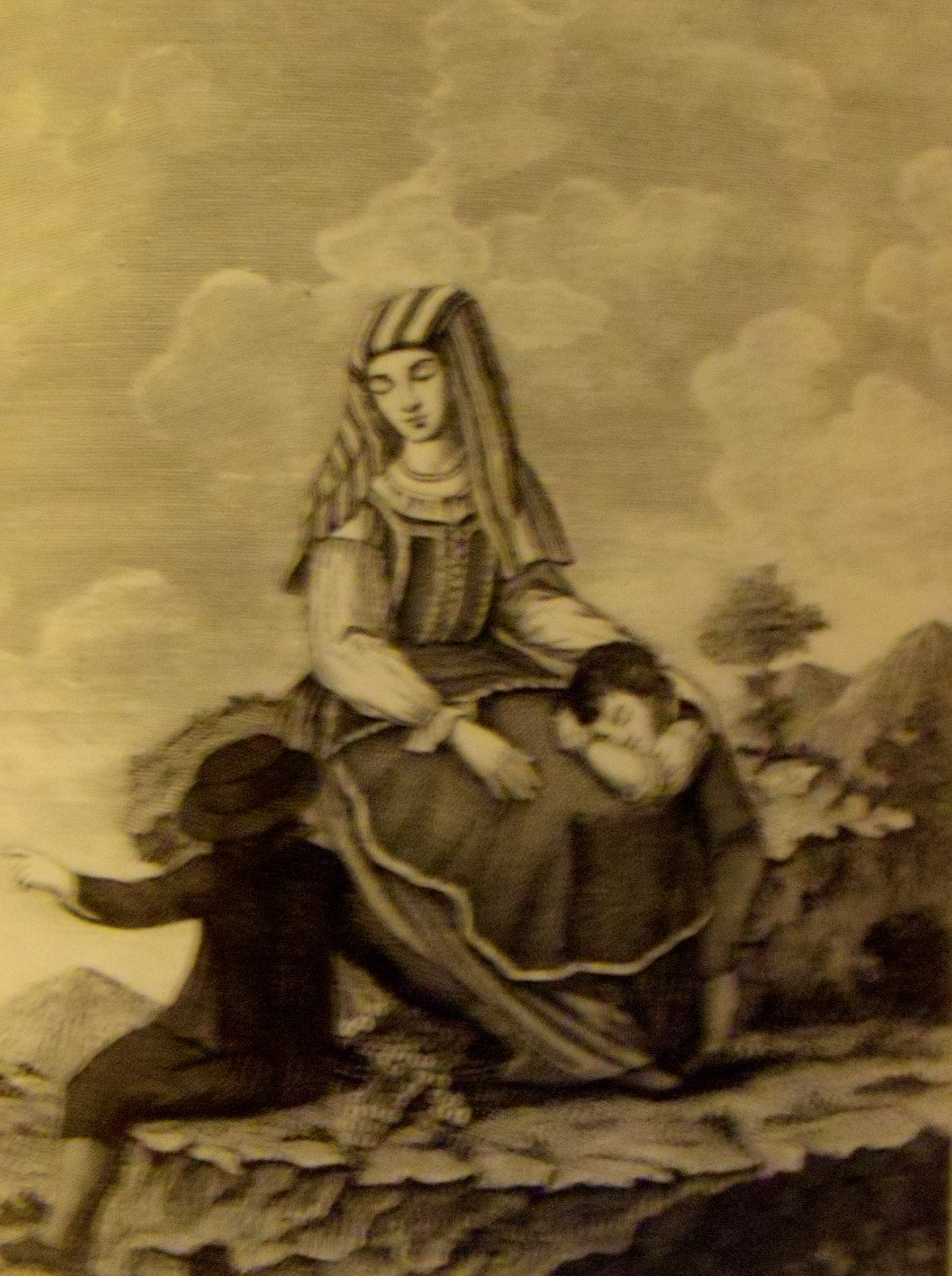
Traditional costume of a Cerreto Sannita woman

The Cerretese dialect (termed the "Cerretese speech" by writer Elena Cofrancesco) reflects late Latin influences, incorporating Spanish, French, Germanic, Greek, and even Turkish and Arabic terms. It differs from neighboring dialects, particularly in accentuation. A 1960s poem in Cerretese by Lucia Ciarleglio Brunelli, "Il mio Paese" ("My Town"), became a local "hymn" after Nicola Giuseppe Giordano’s 1980s musical arrangement. The following are excerpts with an English translation:

It is Cerreto, my city: here I was born, thank God!
It seems so beautiful to me, as if it had been painted with a brush, and I can boast: there is no finer one.
It is surrounded by three mountains and a lot of countryside.
Monte Coppe and Monte Erbano seem to shake hands with Monte Cigno: they are rich and beautiful mountains that stand as our sentinels.
It is also situated between three ravines that do not cause floods: the city slopes and water flows every moment.
The engineer who designed it added "salt and pepper", that is, skill and mastery, and made it symmetrical with perfect geometry.
Every father has told his son that Cerreto is a little Turin - this city is the truth, I can prove it: it has three large, beautiful squares, four straight, narrow streets, and the main street is flanked on both sides by alleys...
È Cerrit i puaiés miu: ccà agge nèta, grazia a Diu!
A me pèr tropp béglie, pèr fatt cu i pnnégl,
e m n pozz avantà: n’at megl n nc po sctà.
Tén atturn tre muntagn e n munn d campagn.
Munt Coppa e Muntrvèn a i Cign dann a mèn: so muntagn ricch e bèll, fann a nua a sntnèll.
Po ’ sctà mméz a tre vallun che n nportn alluviun: i puai és sctà mpnnènt, sc-corr l’acqua ogni mumènt.
I ngegner ca i facéu sèl e pèp c mttéu e cu tutta a giumtria, i facéu a smmtria.
Ogn patr ha ditt a i fuigl ca è Turin piccerigl sctu paiés, e iè vrddà, t l pozz addmusctrà: ha tre chiazz rann e bèll, uatt vie dritte e scnèll, e i Corz è fianchggèt ccà e llà da i ucenèt...

=== Traditions and folklore ===
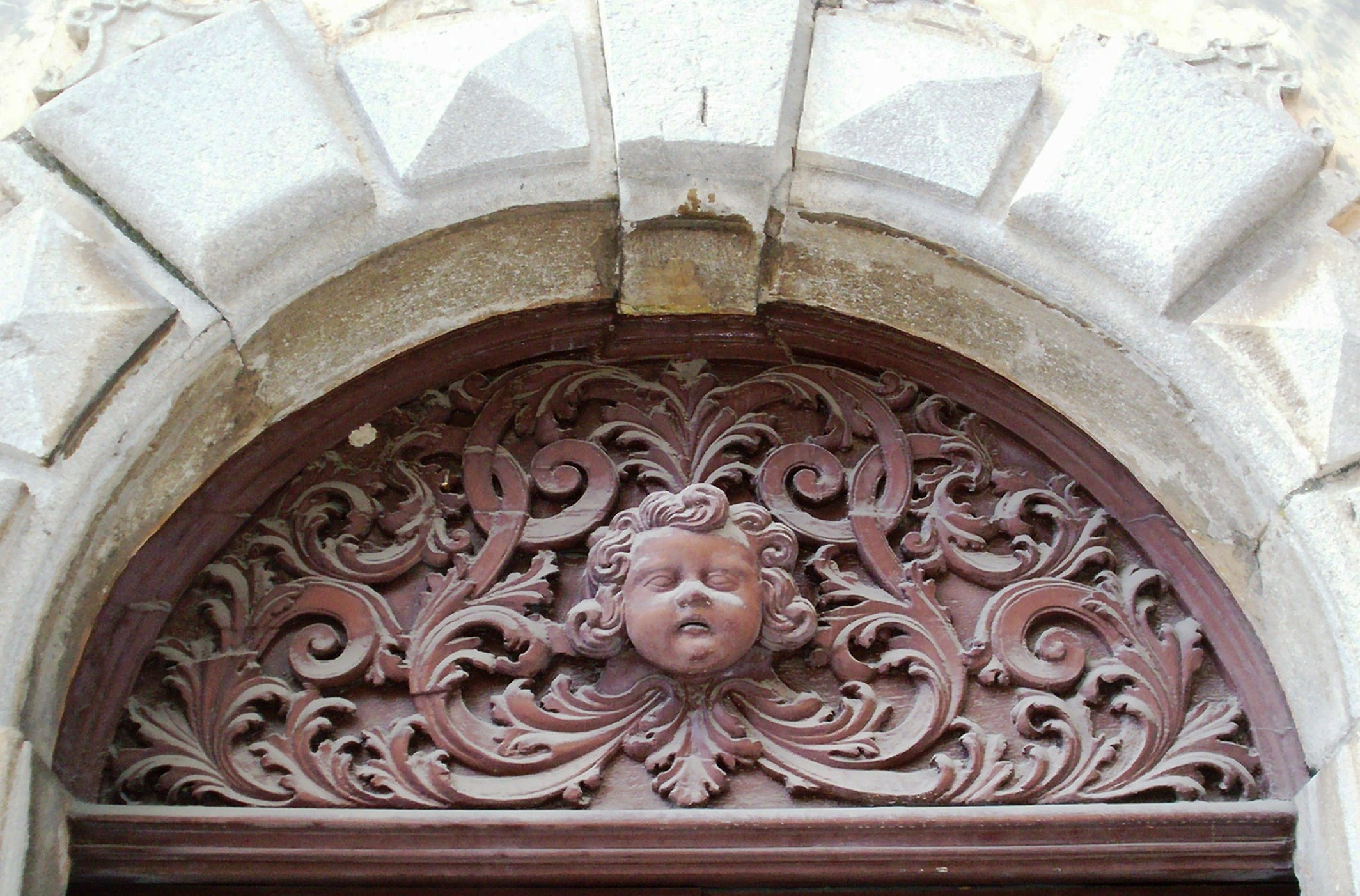
Grate with cherub (Palazzo Carizza)

The traditional female costume, depicted in a late 18th to early 19th-century print for the King of Naples, shows a seated woman with two children, one pointing to the valley where Cerreto lies. Later replicated on ceramic items such as a bottle cooler and tray, it features a light shirt, often woolen dress, a folded shawl on the back, wool stockings, leather shoes, a light-colored "mappa" (headscarf), and an apron or "mantesino".

=== Institutions, entities, and associations ===
Cerreto Sannita hosts decentralized public administration offices, schools, and various entities and associations. It is home to district offices of the Agenzia delle Entrate, the Carabinieri Command Post, the B3 Social District coordination, the Episcopal Curia, and the Mountain Community of Titerno and Alto Tammaro.

The town’s oldest association is the Society of Mutual Aid, founded by Michele Ungaro on 3 March 1881. Next is the "Circolo d’Arte," originally established as a farmers’ society in the late 19th century. The Maria delle Grazie Hospital is also located here.

== Culture ==
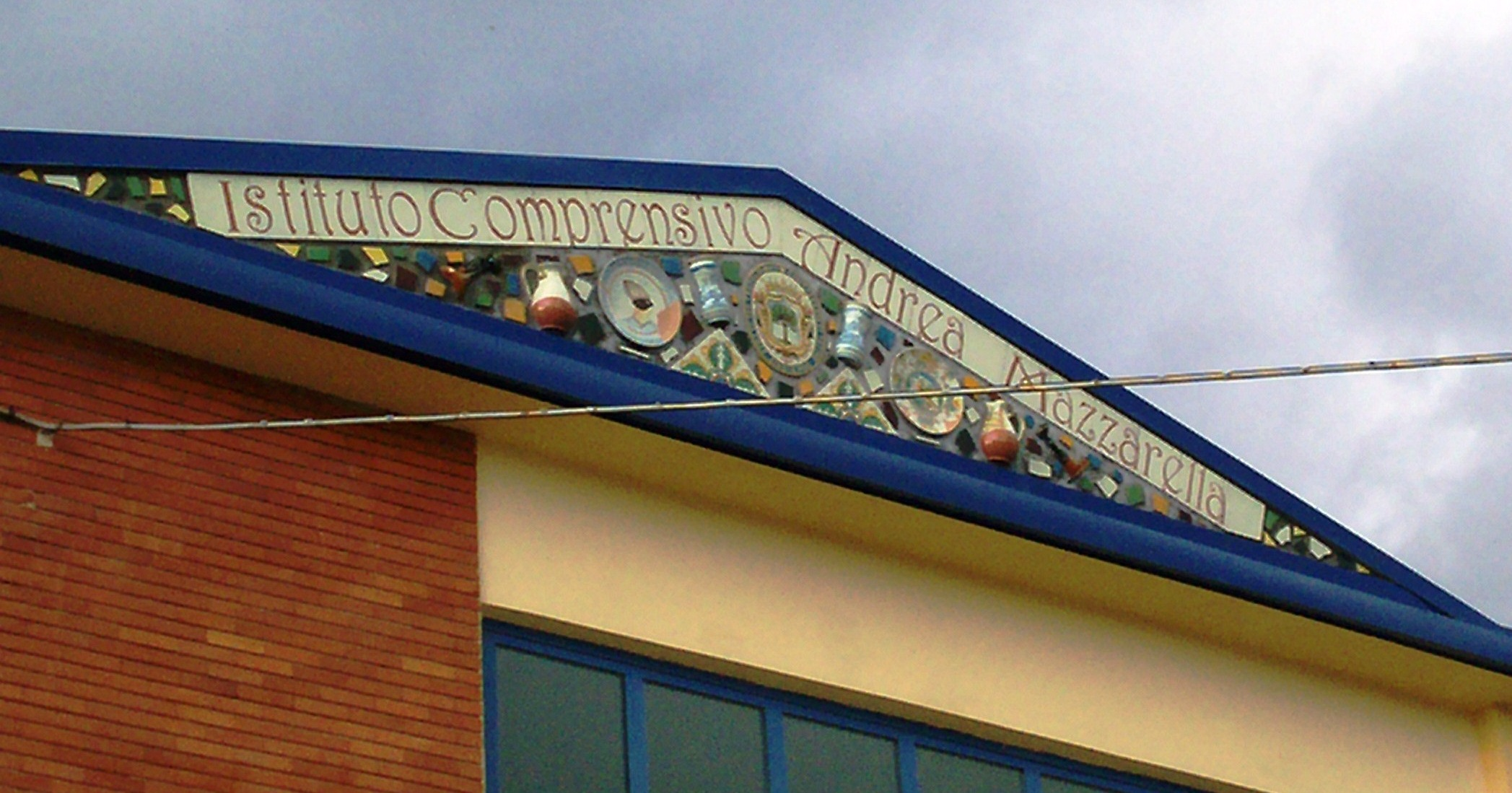
Detail of the elementary school building

=== Education ===
==== Libraries ====
The Diocesan Seminary of Cerreto Sannita’s library holds 10,000 volumes, including many 16th-century texts. Other libraries include those of the Workers' Society and the Carafa-Giustiniani High School.

On 17 December 2011, the "Biblioteca del Sannio" (BIBLOS) opened in the Palazzo del Genio, with the aim of centralizing texts written about or by Samnites in celebration of the local heritage.

==== Schools ====
The oldest educational institution is the Diocesan Seminar, founded in 1593 by Monsignor Cesare Bellocchi. Since 1938, it has included the Episcopal High School "Luigi Sodo," which became a parochial classical high school in 2002. The Higher Institute of Religious Sciences was added in 1973.

The “Nicola Giustiniani” State Art Institute for Ceramics, established in 1957, became an art high school in the 2010/2011 school year. The “Marzio Carafa” Technical Commercial and Surveyor's Institute, founded in 1962, is housed in the former ducal palace in Piazza Luigi Sodo. These merged in 2009 to form the “Carafa Giustiniani” Higher Education Institution.

Primary and lower secondary education is provided by the Mazzacane and Tinta campuses of the “Andrea Mazzarella” Comprehensive Institute.

==== Museums ====
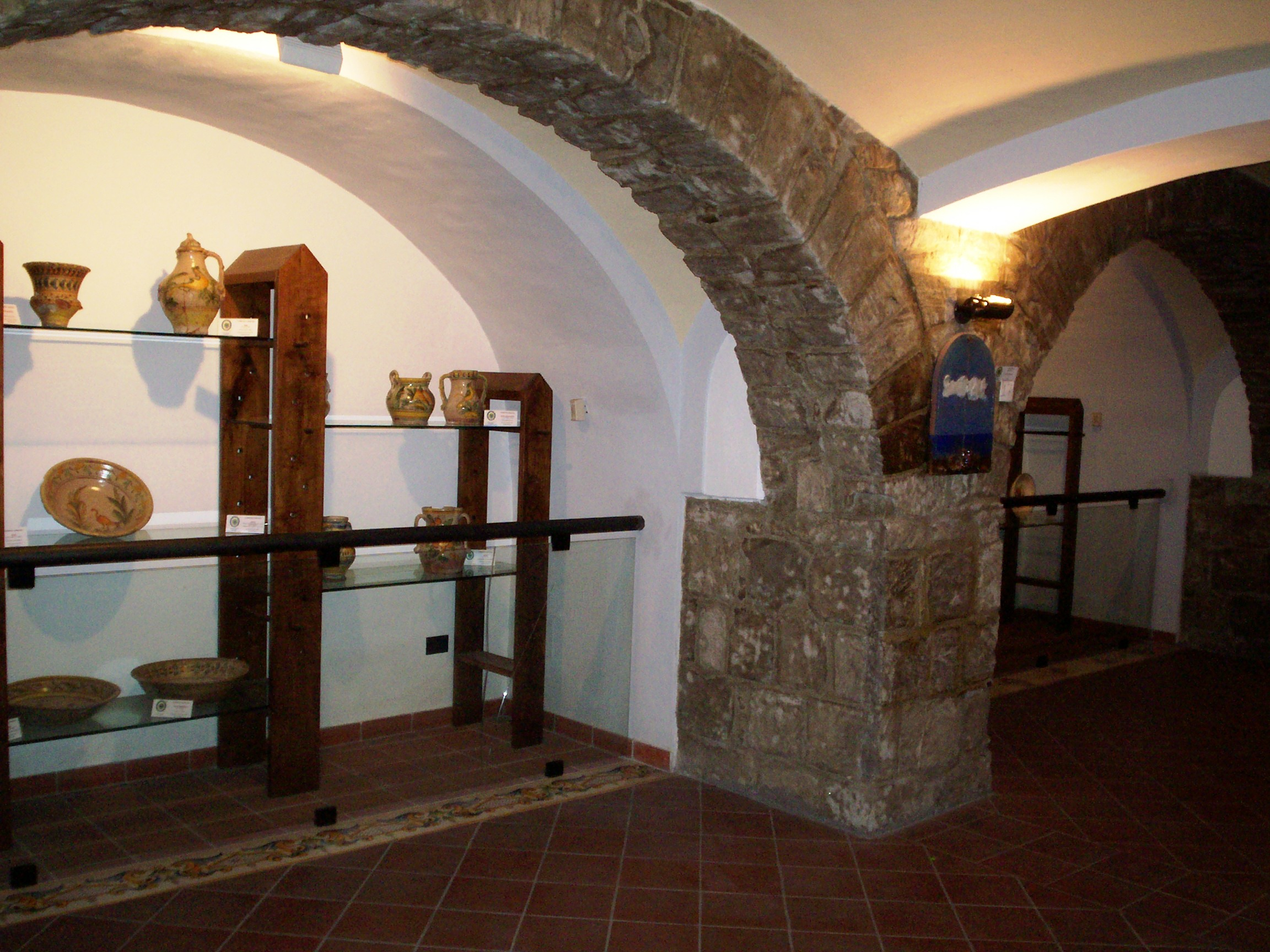
View of the Civic and Ceramics Museum of Cerreto

Cerreto Sannita hosts two municipal museums:

- The Civic and Ceramics Museum of Cerreto, divided into historical and contemporary ceramic sections, recently acquired about 200 pieces from the "Mazzacane Collection."
- The Civic Museum of Sacred Art, displaying valuable religious art objects.

With municipal council resolutions No. 137 and 138 of 5 July 2011, two new permanent exhibits were established: a brigandage museum and an archaeological section within the Civic Museum.

The "Regions of Italy" exhibition, curated by the Giustiniani Association at the Carafa-Giustiniani School headquarters, features ceramic artifacts from Italy's most important ceramic cities.

Smaller permanent displays include a collection of Cerreto ceramic "riggiole" (tiles) near the Collegiate Church of San Martino and a collection of objects and vestments that belonged to the Poor Clare Sisters of Cerreto, housed near the sacristy of the Church of Santa Maria Mater Christi.

=== Art ===
==== Cerreto pottery ====
Cerreto ceramics trace back to ancient times, though their peak production followed the 1688 earthquake. The town’s reconstruction drew many Neapolitan "faenzari" (ceramists), sparking a lavish, Baroque-influenced ceramic tradition.

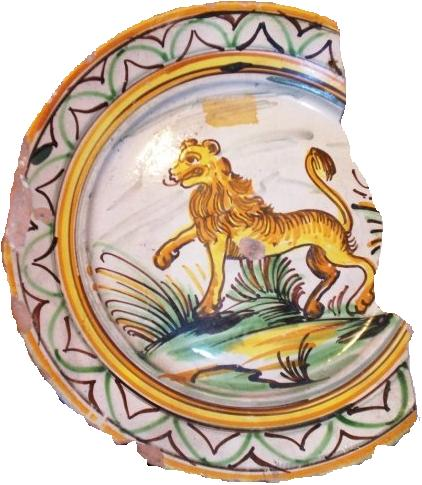
18th-century Cerreto ceramic plate at the Civic and Ceramics Museum of Cerreto

Scholar Salvatore Biondi identifies the oldest Cerreto ceramic as an Ecce Homo statuette owned by Caterina Sanframondi, first abbess of the Monastery of the Poor Clares in old Cerreto.

After 1688, several Neapolitan masters settled in the town, including the Giustiniano, Festa, Scarano and Marchitto families. Through their work, Cerreto ceramics became so sought after and admired that the Neapolitan rulers often commissioned Cerreto artisans to make the figurines for the nativity scene in the Royal Palace of Caserta.

In addition to the real potters (the "faenzari"), there were lesser potters such as the "pignatari", the "cocciolari" and the "canalari", all linked to the working of clay. In the 18th century, Cerreto had a real potters' quarter near the Cathedral. During the restoration of many houses in this area, the remains of kilns for firing terracotta and ceramics have been found.

The ceramics of Cerreto and San Lorenzello (a former hamlet of Cerreto until 1860), after a revival in the middle of the 20th century, promoted by the State Art Institute of Cerreto Sannita, were awarded in 1997 by the Ministry of Industry, Commerce and Handicrafts. They were one of only 33 Italian towns to receive this recognition.

Since 2001, production has been in accordance with a regulation approved by the National Ceramics Council on November 21, 2001.

Typical Cerreto pieces include ceremonial plates, apothecary jars, lobed jugs, stoups, and "riggiole" (tiles) with wind rose or garland motifs, often with religious, naturalistic, or landscape designs. Traditional 17th and 18th century colors are yellow, green, blue, and orange.

=== Theater ===
From the mid-18th century, the former Teatro Comunale (renamed Palazzo del Genio in 2007) hosted performances often acted by Cerreto’s bourgeoisie. Clerical and governmental censorship frequently banned plays, such as Oronzo Cerri’s 1769 satire "Cerreto Modernata," targeting the local clergy.

=== Cinema ===
Three films have been shot in Cerreto Sannita: Maddalena (1954) with Märta Torén and Gino Cervi; The Miller's Beautiful Wife (1955) with Sophia Loren, Marcello Mastroianni, and Vittorio De Sica; and The Italian Brigands (1962) with Ernest Borgnine, Vittorio Gassman, and Rosanna Schiaffino.

=== Cuisine ===
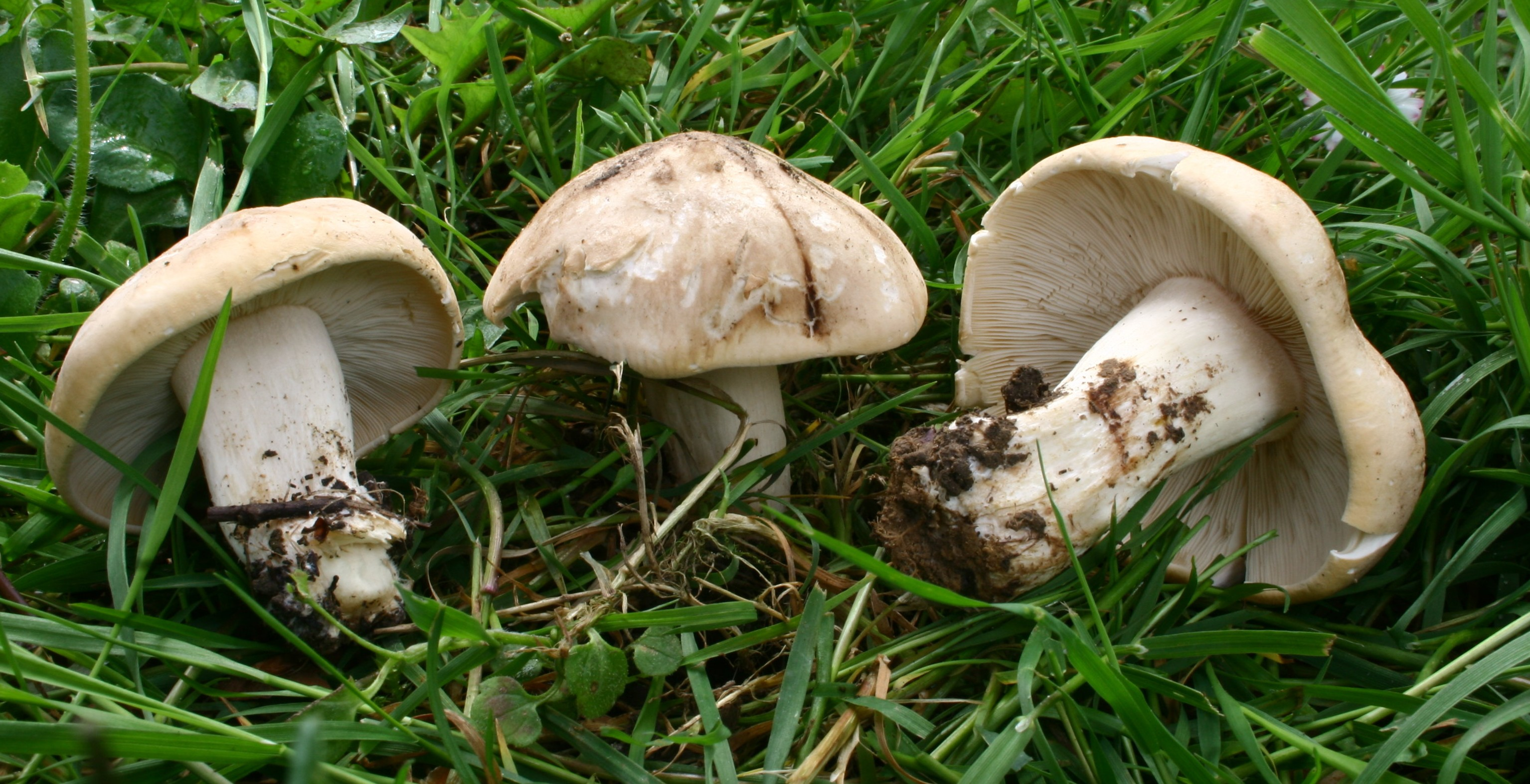
Saint George’s Mushroom

Cerreto's cuisine is rooted in local peasant traditions, with an emphasis on cured meats, sausages and cheeses. Meals may begin with "scagnuzzell," bruschetta topped with diced tomatoes, garlic, olive oil and oregano. First courses favor meat dishes such as ragù, often with ricotta. "Abbuoti", boiled lamb offal, is a typical second course. The Saint George's mushroom (Calocybe gambosa), a spring delicacy from the high pastures of Monte Coppe, enhances dishes such as tagliatelle, omelets, scaloppine and bruschetta.

== Anthropic geography ==
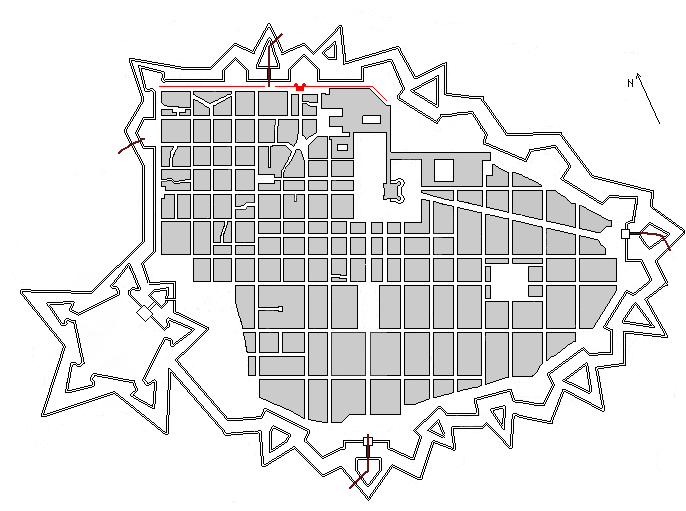
Map of Turin in 1673. Giovanni Battista Manni drew inspiration from a Turin district for Cerreto Sannita’s historic center, earning it the nickname "little Turin."

=== Urban planning ===
The historic center of Cerreto Sannita, in late Baroque style, follows a Roman grid of cardines and decumani. This layout stems from its reconstruction after the earthquake of 1688, which earned it the title of "planned city". A Bourbon official visiting in 1842 called it "Little Turin" because of its street system's resemblance to the Piedmontese capital.

Count Marzio Carafa, supported by his brother Marino and Bishop Giambattista De Bellis, decided to rebuild the city on a new, lower site, despite the objections of some residents. The identity of the designer is debated; Renato Pescitelli attributes it to the royal engineer Giovanni Battista Manni, designer of important buildings such as the feudal prisons and the Collegiate Church of San Martino. Nicola Ciaburri disputes this. Citing contemporary accounts, he argues that Marino Carafa was the mastermind of the urban plan.

Cerreto's ex novo reconstruction differs from that of Sicily's Val di Noto towns after the 1693 earthquake, although both reflect feudal influence, comprehensive planning, and socioeconomic dynamics. In Cerreto, power struggles between Count Marzio Carafa, the Church, and the merchant classes shaped the outcome.

Manni’s design included three block types:

- "Courtyard" blocks for noble palaces;
- "Spine" blocks, long and narrow, for artisans and lower classes;
- "Block" blocks for religious and clerical buildings.

==== The seismic safety of Cerreto Sannita ====
Cerreto has been called "earthquake-proof" in the media, including by geologist Mario Tozzi, who praised its three centuries of resilience on Rai 1's Fuori Luogo (August 22, 2016), but it has not since been hit by an earthquake as severe as that of 1688. The 1805 Molise earthquake caused significant damage, collapsing houses, church towers and domes and killing seven people. Il Foglio criticized Tozzi's claim, noting that Cerreto was 75 km from the epicenter of the 1980 Irpinia earthquake.

Architect Nicola Ciaburri calls Cerreto "attentive to seismic risk" rather than earthquake-proof, noting that its 1688 plan reduced exposure, not seismic force, with features such as wide escape routes, "square systems" for safe zones, and height limits - innovative "civil protection measures." Later 20th century additions and reinforcements have compromised this original resistance.

=== Historical subdivisions ===
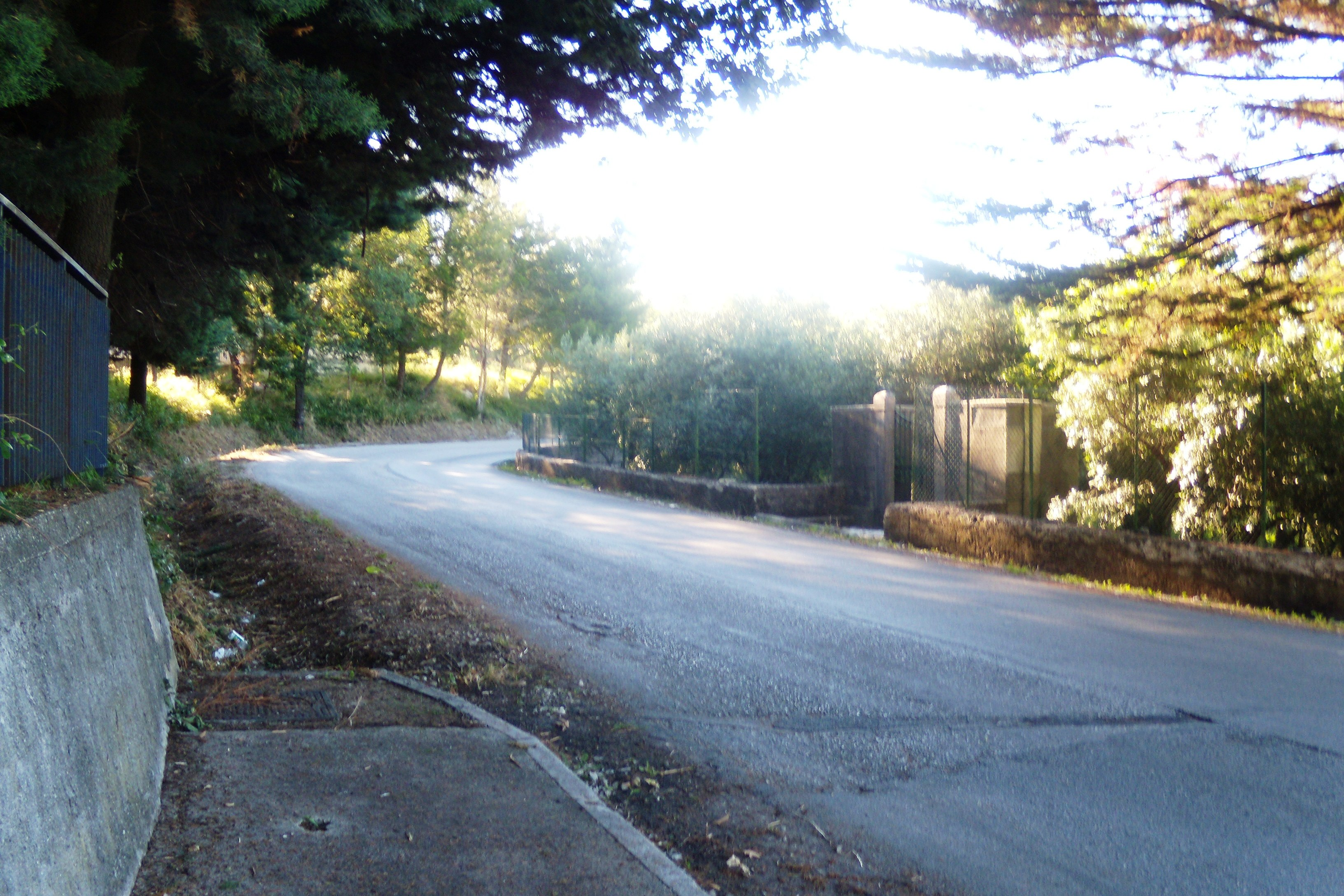
The Cerreto Sannita–Guardia Sanframondi provincial road marks the boundary between "Cesine di Sopra" and "Cesine di Sotto," two of the five district councils in the municipal statute

The traditional subdivisions of the historic center are the following districts:

1. La Cartoniera (Via Nicotera);
2. La Cattedrale;
3. La Costa di San Vito (Via Coste);
4. Dietro dai Caprai (Via Belle Donne);
5. Dietro alle Vigne (Via Massarelli);
6. Dietro San Nicola (Piazza Mazzacane);
7. La Quinta Armata (Via Chiaie);
8. La Tinta (Via Tinta);
9. Capo da fuori (Via Mazzarella);
10. Spineto (Via Fabbri);
11. San Martino (Piazza Vittorio Emanuele);
12. Sopra dalle Monache (Piazza Roma);
13. Sulla Villa (Piazza Luigi Sodo);
14. San Gennaro;
15. Santa Maria;
16. San Rocco.

=== Administrative subdivisions ===
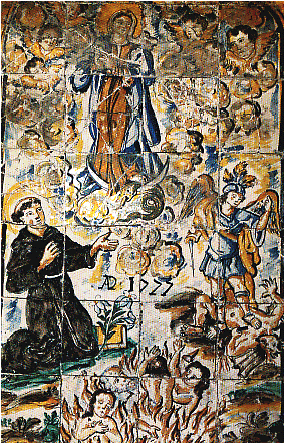
18th-century Cerreto ceramic shrine

Article 48 of the Municipal Statute of 2005 divides the territory into five district councils:

1. Madonna della Libera – Raone – Trocchia – Madonna del Carmine – San Giovanni;
2. Sant’Anna – Pontecolonna – Madonna del Soccorso;
3. Montrino – Cerquelle – Madonna delle Grazie – Pezzalonga;
4. Cesine di Sopra;
5. Cesine di Sotto – Dodici Angeli – Acquara.

These councils, outlined in the 1990 and 2005 statutes, remain inactive due to unapproved implementing regulations.

== Economy ==
For centuries, Cerreto Sannita’s economy thrived on wool trade and processing, creating an industry with specialized workshops: fulling mills, carding houses, and dye works for fulling, pressing, and dyeing wool. In 1625, the Universitas owned 14 fulling mills leased to locals. This important and profitable sector began to decline after the unification of Italy due to strong competition from industries in the north.

Since the 1970s, the economy has shifted to services and tourism, though agriculture remains vital with olive groves, vineyards, and orchards.

The production of extra virgin olive oil (Cerreto Sannita is also known as the city of oil) takes place in four oil mills that can be visited in November during the event "Le domeniche dell'Olio" (Oil Sundays).

Numerous workshops produce traditional Cerreto and San Lorenzello ceramics.

In 2009, 1,440 residents (34.2% of the population) filed IRPEF returns for a total of €29,055,244. In 2010, this number decreased to 1,436 (34.5%) with €29,223,554 and increased to €30,507,350 in 2011.

Per capita income was €6,903 in 2009 and €7,505 in 2011, below the national average.

Cerreto Sannita has the Bandiera Arancione designation.

== Infrastructure and transport ==
Cerreto Sannita is crossed by the State Road 76, which connects it to Guardia Sanframondi and to the former State Road 87 Sannitica, as well as to Cusano Mutri and Pietraroja. The provincial road 79 connects it to the state road 372 Telesina.

Interurban transport is managed by Autoservizi Irpini SpA for Naples and Benevento, and Ferrazza bus lines for Telese Terme.

The nearest train station is Telese-Cerreto on the Caserta-Benevento section of the Naples-Foggia line.

== Administration ==
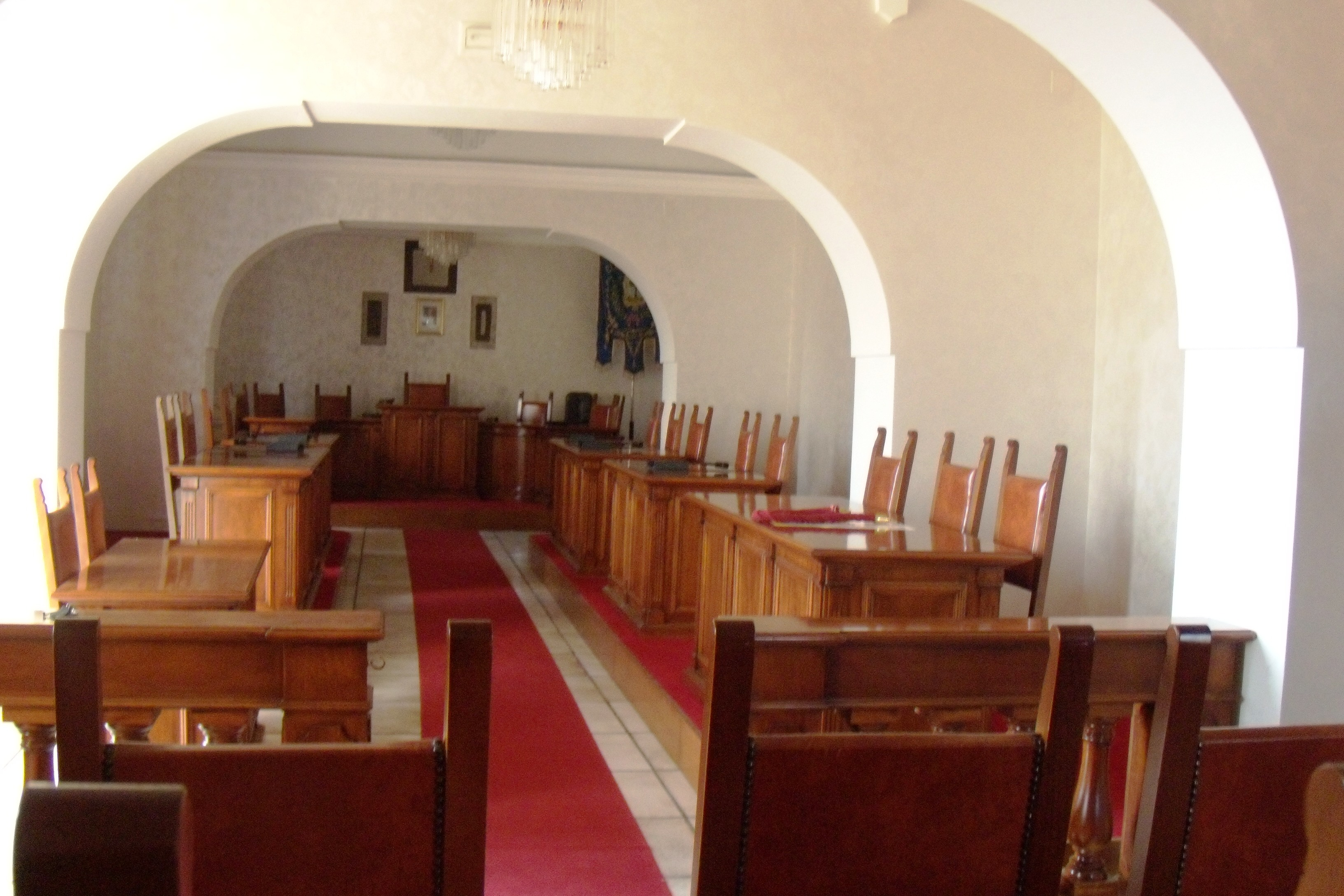
View of the municipal council chamber in Palazzo Sant'Antonio

Municipal offices are located in Palazzo Sant'Antonio.

=== Twin towns ===
- Cuenca (since January 5, 2017)

=== Other administrative information ===
Cerreto Sannita has been a regional and national leader in recycling, winning the "Comuni Ricicloni" award in 2009 and 2010. Since 2008, it has implemented door-to-door waste sorting. Yearly data is available.

In 2004, the Touring Club Italiano awarded it the Bandiera Arancione for the quality of inland tourism, stating: "The town has developed a distinct tourist identity based on local handicrafts and food products, and actively organizes related events. Known as a "planned city" for its regular layout, it was rebuilt after the earthquake of 1688, designed by the "Royal Engineer" Giovanni Battista Manni. Cerreto Sannita is clean and well maintained".

The municipality is a founding member of the Italian Association of Ceramic Cities (AICC), which unites the most important ceramic production centers in Italy.

It is part of the Mountain Community of Titerno and Alto Tammaro.

== Sports ==
Until 2008, Cerreto had two football teams: Cerretese and Real Cerreto. By 2014, two amateur clubs existed: A.S.D. Libertas Cerreto, founded in 2009, and the now-defunct Real Cominium.

Libertas Cerreto plays in the Serie D futsal league.

The women's futsal team, Polisportiva Cerreto Sannita, reached Serie A in 2011.

The municipality has two public sports facilities: a municipal stadium and a covered multipurpose sports hall.

== See also ==
- Roman Catholic Diocese of Cerreto Sannita-Telese-Sant'Agata de' Goti
- Samnium

== Bibliography ==
- AA. VV. (1991). Cerreto Sannita: Testimonianze d'arte tra Sette e Ottocento [Cerreto Sannita: Testimonies of Art between the 18th and 19th Centuries] (in Italian). Napoli: Edizioni Scientifiche Italiane.
- AA. VV. (2010). Cerreto Sannita [Cerreto Sannita] (in Italian). Cerreto Sannita: Società Operaia di Cerreto Sannita.
- AA. VV. (1995). Guida di Cerreto Sannita [Guide to Cerreto Sannita] (in Italian). Cerreto Sannita: Pubblitaf.
- AA. VV. (2007). La Ceramica di Cerreto Sannita e San Lorenzello [The Ceramics of Cerreto Sannita and San Lorenzello] (in Italian). San Lorenzello: E.C.S.C.S.L.M.
- AA. VV. (1998). La Chiesa di San Gennaro Vescovo in Cerreto Sannita [The Church of San Gennaro Vescovo in Cerreto Sannita] (in Italian). estratto dalla rivista "Samnium".
- AA. VV. (2017). Un'Antologia per Cerreto [An Anthology for Cerreto] (in Italian). Cerreto Sannita: Istituto Comprensivo Mazzarella e Società Operaia di Cerreto Sannita.
- Biondi, Adam (2017). Cenni storici su Cerreto Sannita (estratto da Un'Antologia per Cerreto) [Historical Notes on Cerreto Sannita (excerpt from An Anthology for Cerreto)] (in Italian). Cerreto Sannita: Istituto Comprensivo Mazzarella e Società Operaia di Cerreto Sannita.
- Biondi, Adam (2019). La Cerreto degli anni di Michele Ungaro in Michele Ungaro: scritti per il bicentenario della nascita [Cerreto in the Years of Michele Ungaro in Michele Ungaro: Writings for the Bicentenary of His Birth] (in Italian). Cerreto Sannita: Società Operaia di Mutuo Soccorso di Cerreto Sannita. ISBN 9788894485011.
- Biondi (a cura di), Adam (2016). Progetto SchedaCerreto: Storia di Cerreto Sannita [SchedaCerreto Project: History of Cerreto Sannita] (in Italian). Cerreto Sannita: Società Operaia di Mutuo Soccorso di Cerreto Sannita.
- Biondi, Salvatore (1970). Storia delle antichissime ceramiche di Cerreto Sannita [History of the Very Ancient Ceramics of Cerreto Sannita] (in Italian). Benevento.
- Ciaburri, Nicola (1989). Di Città cadute per tremuoti... in: Cerreto Sannita - Laboratorio di progettazione 1988 [Of Cities Fallen by Earthquakes... in: Cerreto Sannita - 1988 Design Laboratory] (in Italian). Roma: Kappa.
- Ciaburri, Nicola (2017). La forma come resistenza sismica: una città ricostruita dopo il terremoto del 1688 [Form as Seismic Resistance: A City Rebuilt After the 1688 Earthquake] (in Italian). Cerreto Sannita: TETAprint.
- Ciaburri, Nicola (1987). La ricostruzione di Cerreto Sannita dopo il terremoto del 1688 in: Illuminismo meridionale e Comunità locali [The Reconstruction of Cerreto Sannita After the 1688 Earthquake in: Southern Enlightenment and Local Communities] (in Italian). Napoli: Guida.
- Cofrancesco, Elena (1990). La Parlata Cerretese: "L C'rratèn" [The Cerretese Dialect: "L C'rratèn"] (in Italian) (1 ed.). Cerreto Sannita: A.S.C.C.
- Cofrancesco, Elena (2002). La Parlata Cerretese: "L C'rratèn" [The Cerretese Dialect: "L C'rratèn"] (in Italian) (2 ed.). Cerreto Sannita: A.S.C.C.
- De Nicola, Giuseppe (2019). Notizie storiche ed urbanistiche di Cerreto antica [Historical and Urbanistic Notes on Ancient Cerreto] (in Italian). Cerreto Sannita: Società Operaia di Mutuo Soccorso di Cerreto Sannita. ISBN 9788894485004.
- Mazzacane, Vincenzo (1990). Memorie storiche di Cerreto Sannita [Historical Memories of Cerreto Sannita] (in Italian). Napoli: Liguori. ISBN 8820719282.
- Pescitelli, Renato (2011). Cerreto Sacra: volume secondo [Sacred Cerreto: Volume Two] (in Italian). Cerreto Sannita: TetaPrint.
- Pescitelli, Renato (1977). Chiesa Telesina: luoghi di culto, di educazione e di assistenza nel XVI e XVII secolo [Telesina Church: Places of Worship, Education, and Assistance in the 16th and 17th Centuries] (in Italian). Benevento: Auxiliatrix.
- Pescitelli, Renato (1989). La Chiesa Cattedrale, il Seminario e l'Episcopio in Cerreto Sannita [The Cathedral Church, the Seminary, and the Bishop's Palace in Cerreto Sannita] (in Italian). Napoli: Laurenziana.
- Pescitelli, Renato (1990). La Chiesa Collegiata di San Martino Vescovo in Cerreto Sannita [The Collegiate Church of San Martino Bishop in Cerreto Sannita] (in Italian). Telese Terme: Don Bosco.
- Pescitelli, Renato (2001). Palazzi, Case e famiglie cerretesi del XVIII secolo: la rinascita, l'urbanistica e la società di Cerreto Sannita dopo il sisma del 1688 [Palaces, Houses, and Cerretese Families of the 18th Century: The Rebirth, Urban Planning, and Society of Cerreto Sannita After the 1688 Earthquake] (in Italian). Telese Terme: Don Bosco.
- Pescitelli, Renato (2004). La Chiesa di San Rocco in Cerreto Sannita [The Church of San Rocco in Cerreto Sannita] (in Italian). Cerreto Sannita: Di Lauro.
- Pescitelli, Renato (2002). I Francescani Conventuali a Cerreto Sannita [The Conventual Franciscans in Cerreto Sannita] (in Italian). Cerreto Sannita: Diocesi di Cerreto, Telese, Sant'Agata de Goti.
- Pescitelli, Renato (1969). Pietro Paolo Fusco nella Cerreto del primo '900 [Pietro Paolo Fusco in the Cerreto of the Early 20th Century] (in Italian). Benevento: A.B.E.T.E.
- Pro Loco (2003). "Una passeggiata nella storia". Cerreto Sannita [A Walk Through History] (in Italian). Cerreto Sannita: Di Lauro.
- Rotili, Mario (1952). L'Arte nel Sannio [Art in Sannio] (in Italian). Benevento: Ente Provinciale per il Turismo.
- Rotondi, Nicola (1870). Memorie storiche di Cerreto Sannita [Historical Memories of Cerreto Sannita] (in Italian). Cerreto Sannita: manoscritto inedito conservato nell'Archivio comunale.
- Vigliotti, Nicola (1970). I Giustiniani e la ceramica cerretese [The Giustiniani and Cerretese Ceramics] (in Italian). Napoli: LER.
- Vigliotti, Nicola (2007). L'epitaffio dimenticato: rilevanze storiche [The Forgotten Epitaph: Historical Significance] (in Italian). Cerreto Sannita: A. Di leone & C.
- Vigliotti, Nicola (2000). Il Culto Micaelico nella Grotta della Leonessa [The Michaelic Cult in the Leonessa Cave] (in Italian). Cerreto Sannita: Comunità Montana del Titerno.
- Zazo, Alfredo (1973). Dizionario Bio-Bibliografico del Sannio [Bio-Bibliographical Dictionary of Sannio] (in Italian). Napoli: Fausto Fiorentino.
