= Cusano Mutri =

- Comune
- Comune di Cusano Mutri
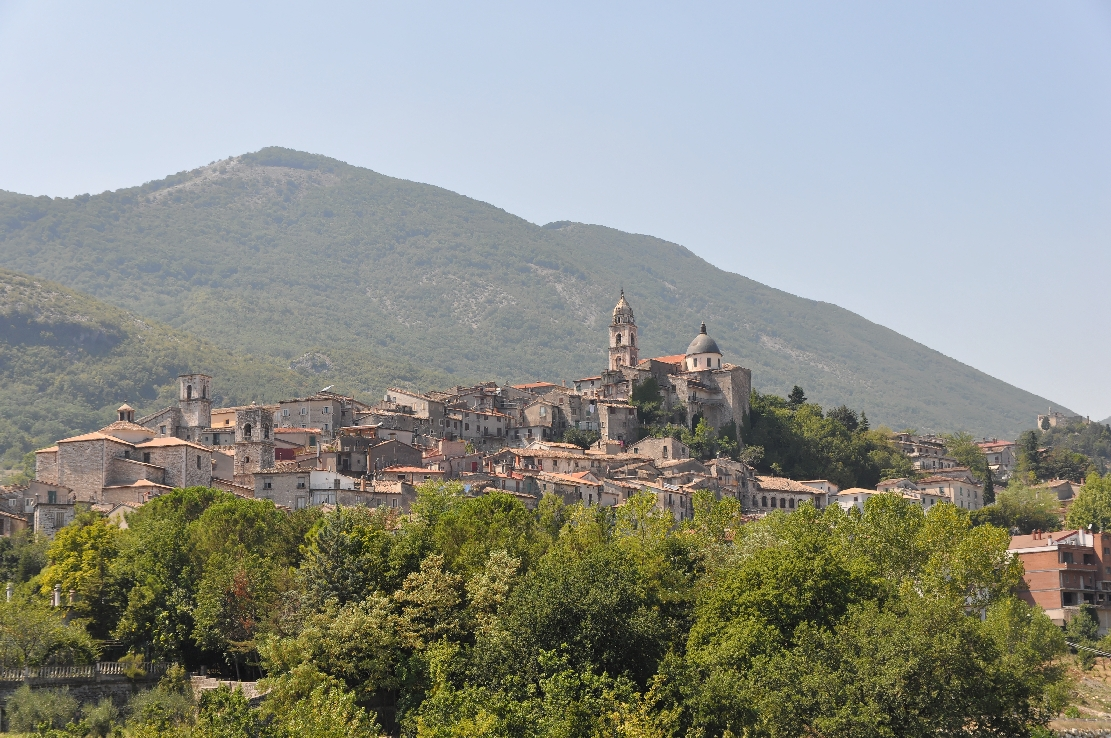
- View of the historic centre of Cusano Mutri

- Location within Italy Location within Campania
- Coordinates: 41°21′N 14°30′E
- Country: Italy
- Region: Campania
- Province: Benevento (BN)
- Frazioni: Civitella Licinio, Bocca della Selva

Government
  - Mayor: Pietro Crocco (Uniti per Cusano)

Area
  - Total: 58.8 km^{2} (22.7 sq mi)
- Elevation: 450 m (1,480 ft)

Population (1 January 2020)
  - Total: 3,957
  - Density: 67.3/km^{2} (174/sq mi)
- Demonym: Cusanesi
- Time zone: UTC+1 (CET)
  - Summer (DST): UTC+2 (CEST)
- Postal code: 82033
- Dialing code: 0824
- ISTAT code: 062026
- Patron saint: Saint Nicholas
- Saint day: 6 December
- Website: Official website

Cusano Mutri is a comune (municipality) in the Province of Benevento in the Italian region Campania, located about 60 km (37 mi) northeast of Naples and about 35 km (22 mi) northwest of Benevento.

The municipality of Cusano Mutri contains the frazioni (subdivisions, mainly villages and hamlets) Civitella Licinio and Bocca della Selva.

Cusano Mutri borders the following municipalities: Cerreto Sannita, Faicchio, Gioia Sannitica, Guardiaregia, Piedimonte Matese, Pietraroja, San Lorenzello, San Potito Sannitico.
