= Temple of Flora (Cerreto Sannita) =

Coordinates: 41°18′20.72″N 14°33′45.80″E

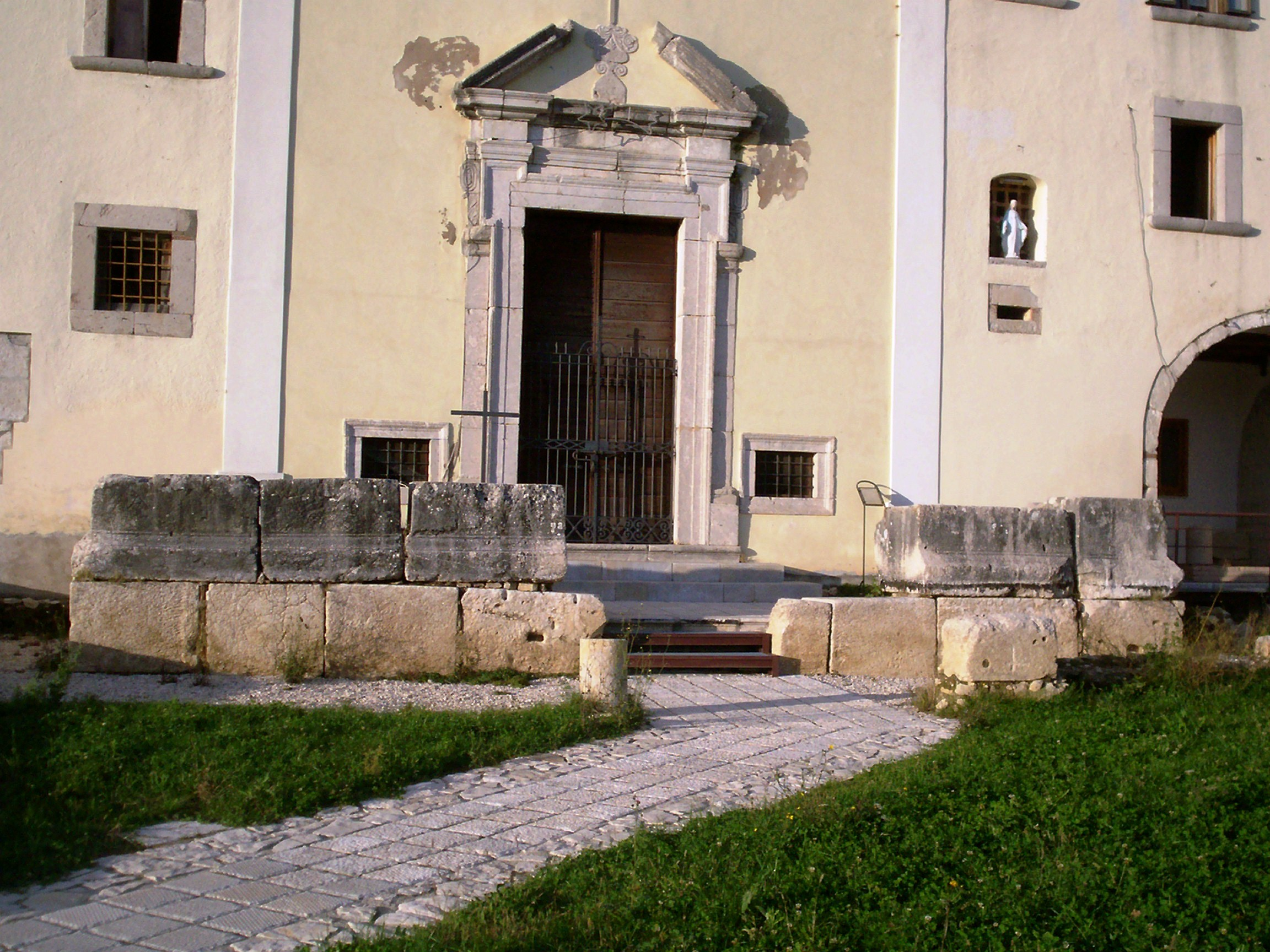
The remains of the temple's base located near the Church of Madonna della Libera.

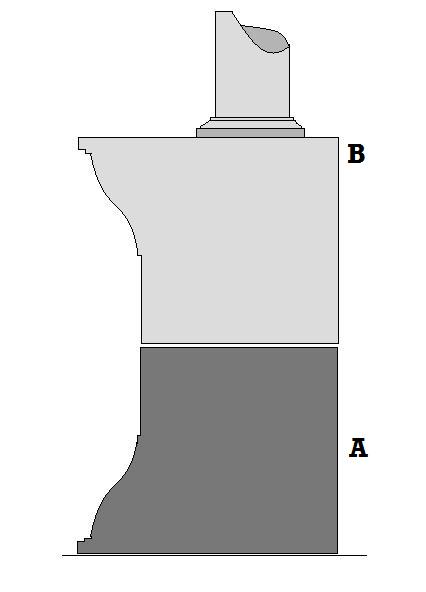
The temple's podium: A) existing part; B) reconstruction.

The Temple of Flora was an ancient Samnite temple located in Cerreto Sannita, Italy.

== History ==
The temple was located in a former Samnite settlement, likely "Cominium Ocritum," mentioned by Livy and reached by Hanno, a general of Hannibal, during the Second Punic War.

Few archaeological remains from this Samnite village exist, including dry stone walls on Monte Cigno and the remnants of the temple, dedicated to the goddess Flora, the goddess of harvest.

A written document supporting the presence of a Samnite settlement in the area, where the temple's remains are found, comes from a document by notary Mario Cappella dated 1593. It highlights the memory of a "village of Rocca del Cigno," corresponding to the Samnite-Roman village situated between the temple and the "Rocca" of Monte Cigno (the terminal part of the mountain).

In some 17th-century documents, the area where the temple was located was referred to as "Campo di fiore" or "Campo di fiori." According to some historians, the name "fiore" or "flore" derives from "Flora," the deity to whom the temple was dedicated.

Over the centuries, the Church of Madonna della Libera was built over the remains of the temple.

On 10 February 1951, a series of Roman-era silver coins were found in this area, supporting the theory of the existence of "Cominium" in the Monte Cigno-Madonna della Libera area.

In the 1930s, local historian Silvestro Mastrobuoni conducted a survey of the area, searching for archaeological remains. On Monte Cigno, he found and photographed "pieces of tuff that must have formed the vault of some rooms" and, on the northern side of the mountain, "where a kind of square can be seen, we noticed a cistern and traces of ancient walls."

Following some surveys conducted on Monte Cigno by the Historical Office of the Army General Staff, the presence of a mule track paved in Portuguese stone and numerous remains of Samnite stonework in polygonal masonry, very similar to those existing in Saepinum, were discovered. Dense reforestation made it impossible to visit the area explored by Mastrobuoni in the 1930s, likely the richest in archaeological remains.

== Description ==
Only a few polygonal blocks forming the base of the temple's podium remain, located near the Church of Madonna della Libera. Above these blocks, other square stone blocks were placed upside down in relation to the previous ones. Above these last blocks rested columns decorated with richly foliated stone capitals. Some of these capitals were found in some farmers' stables where, after being hollowed out in the middle, they were used as drinking troughs for chickens.

In the center of the base, a crack allowed access to the temple's sacellum via a staircase.

Some blocks from the temple were used in the 18th century to build the fountain located a few dozen meters from the Church of Madonna della Libera.

== See also ==
- Cerreto Sannita

== Bibliography ==
- Mazzacane, Vincenzo (1990). Memorie storiche di Cerreto Sannita. Liguori Editore.
- Rotondi, Nicola (1870). Memorie storiche di Cerreto Sannita. manuscript in the Municipal Archive.
- Pescitelli, Renato (1977). Chiesa Telesina: luoghi di culto, di educazione e di assistenza nel XVI e XVII secolo. Auxiliatrix.
- Pro Loco Cerreto Sannita (2003). Una passeggiata nella storia. Cerreto Sannita: Di Lauro.
- Russo, Flavio (1991). Dai Sanniti all'Esercito Italiano: La Regione Fortificata del Matese. Ufficio Storico Stato Maggiore Esercito.
