= San Lorenzello =

- Comune
- Comune di San Lorenzello
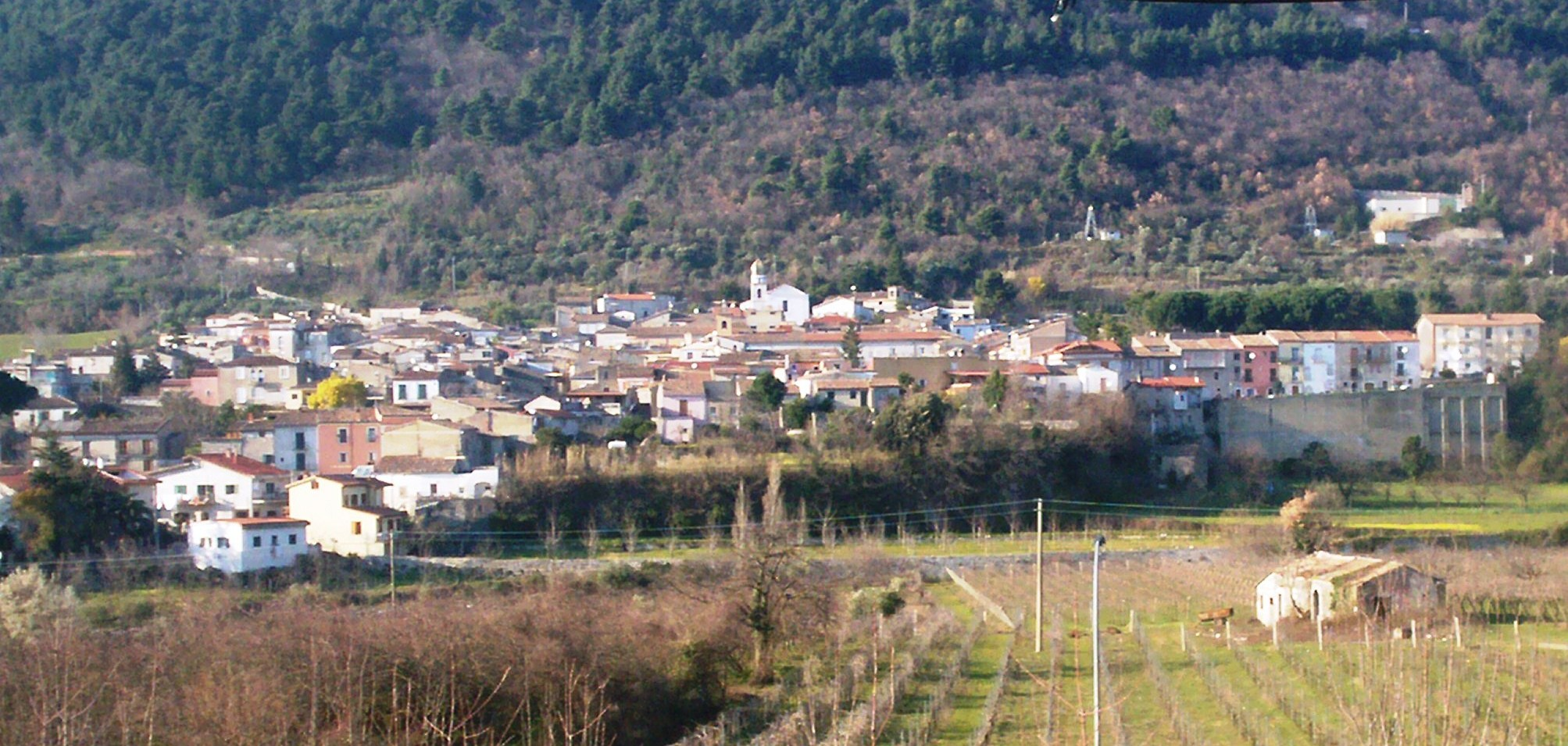

- Coat of arms

- Location within Italy Location within Campania
- Coordinates: 41°16′N 14°33′E
- Country: Italy
- Region: Campania
- Province: Benevento (BN)

Government
  - Mayor: Antimo Lavorgna

Area
  - Total: 13.88 km^{2} (5.36 sq mi)
- Elevation: 250 m (820 ft)

Population (1 May 2009)
  - Total: 2,340
  - Density: 169/km^{2} (437/sq mi)
- Demonym: Laurentini
- Time zone: UTC+1 (CET)
  - Summer (DST): UTC+2 (CEST)
- Postal code: 82030
- Dialing code: 0824

San Lorenzello (Campanian: Sàntu Lurienzë) is a comune (municipality) in the Province of Benevento in the Italian region Campania, located northeast of Naples and about 25 kilometres (16 mi) northwest of Benevento.

San Lorenzello borders the following municipalities: Castelvenere, Cerreto Sannita, Cusano Mutri, Faicchio, Guardia Sanframondi, San Salvatore Telesino.

== Twin towns ==
- Amaseno, Italy
- Striano, Italy
