= Amaseno =

- Comune
- Comune di Amaseno
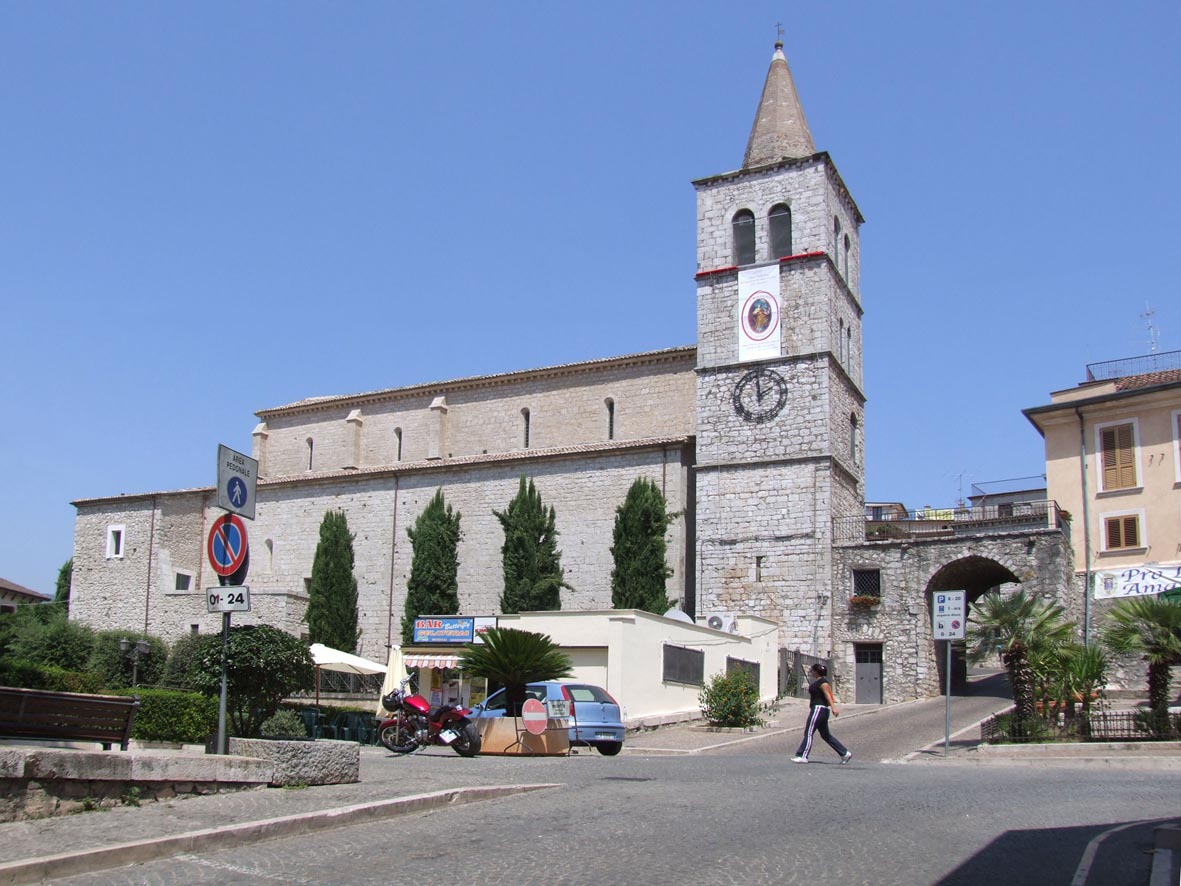
- Santa Maria Annunziata

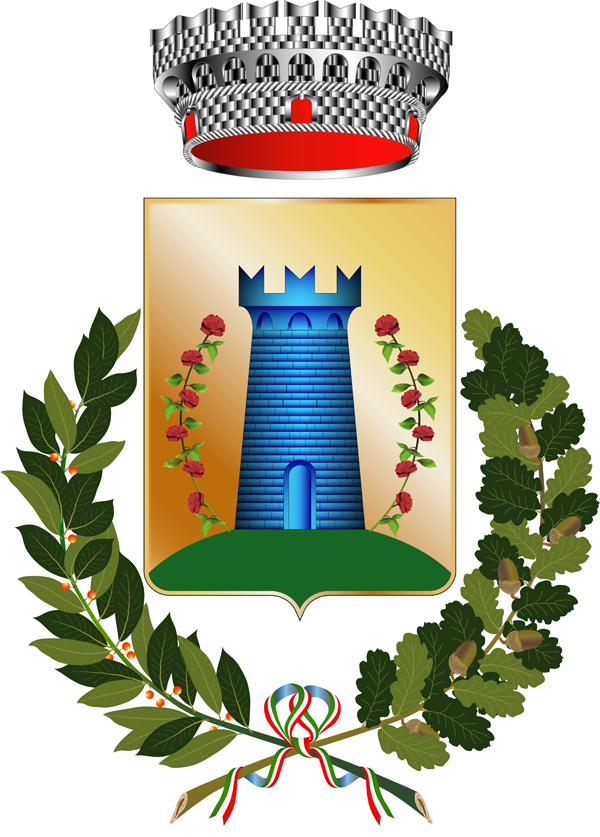
- Coat of arms

- Location of Amaseno in Italy Amaseno (Lazio)
- Coordinates: 41°28′N 13°20′E
- Country: Italy
- Region: Lazio
- Province: Frosinone (FR)

Government
  - Mayor: Antonio Como

Area
  - Total: 77.73 km^{2} (30.01 sq mi)
- Elevation: 112 m (367 ft)

Population (28 February 2017)
  - Total: 4,352
  - Density: 55.99/km^{2} (145.0/sq mi)
- Demonym: Amasenensi
- Time zone: UTC+1 (CET)
  - Summer (DST): UTC+2 (CEST)
- Postal code: 03021
- Dialing code: 0775
- Patron saint: St. Lawrence
- Saint day: August 10
- Website: Official website

Amaseno (local dialect: Masé) is a comune (municipality) in the Province of Frosinone in the Italian region Lazio, located about 100 kilometres (62 mi) southeast of Rome and about 30 kilometres (19 mi) south of Frosinone, located in the Monti Lepini mountain area. Its inhabitants are primarily farmers.

The village is very ancient and named in the Aeneid. Many of Amaseno's people have immigrated to the United States of America, in Canada and South America (especially in Brazil).

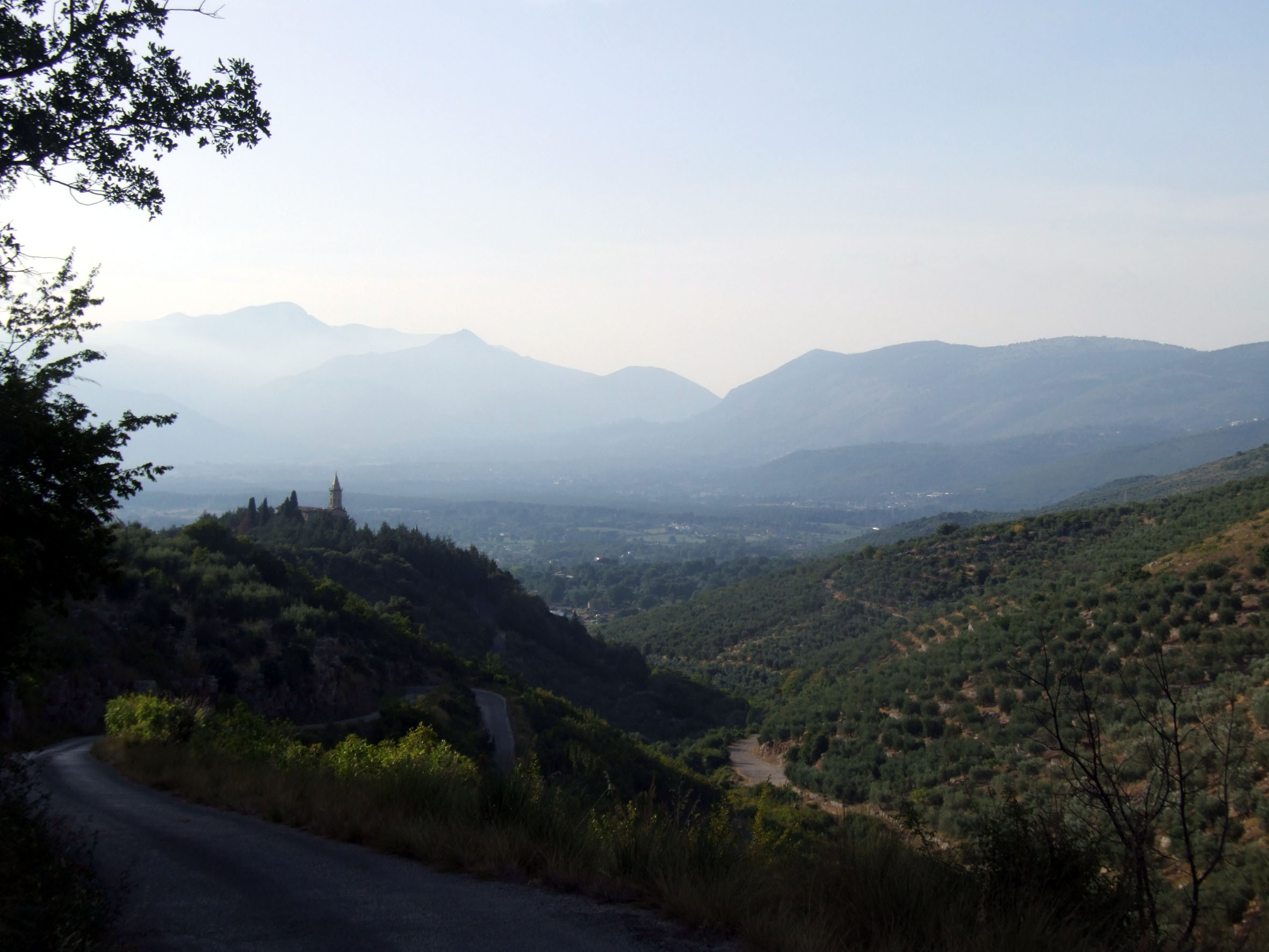
The Auricola

== Main sights ==
The Catholic Church situated at the village's center, St. Mary of Amaseno, houses a relic of St. Lawrence, the ancient Roman deacon martyred in the 3rd century. A vial of the martyr's blood is enshrined there, and every 10 August on his feast day, the day on which his martyrdom is commemorated, it liquifies. The reliquary vial has been verified by scientists to contain true blood, along with a piece of skin and some fat and ash. The cathedral was consecrated in 1165 and since then the village was popularly known as the "Valley of St. Lawrence", as the village is situated in an amphitheater-like valley.

== Economy ==
The principal food product is the water buffalo mozzarella; other important products include olive oil and marzolina, a special cheese made by milk of goat.

== Twin towns ==
- San Lorenzello, Italy
