= Bandiera arancione =

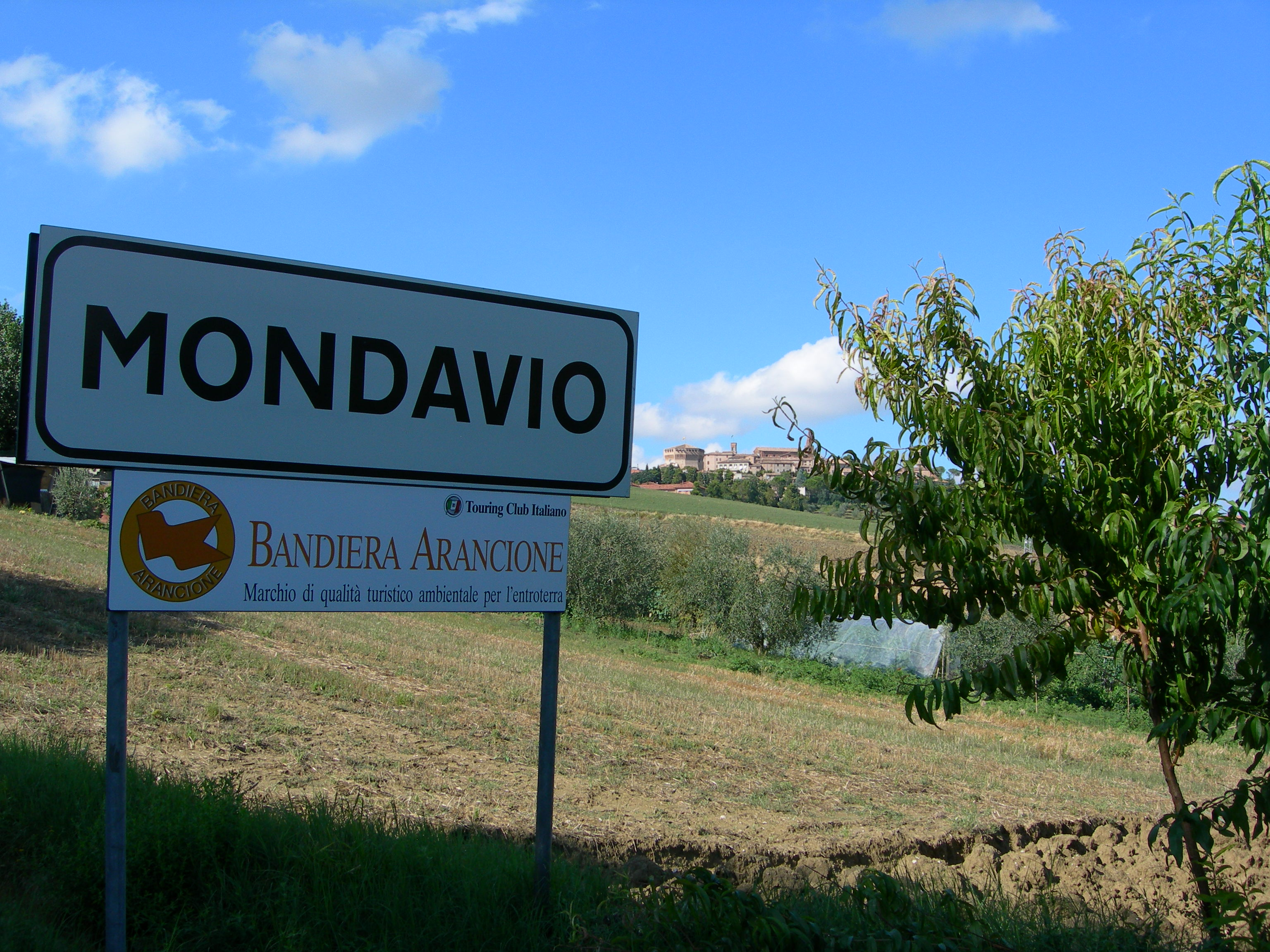
Bandiera arancione on a road sign to Mondavio

The Bandiera arancione (Italian pronunciation: [banˈdjɛːra aranˈtʃoːne]; "Orange Flag") is a recognition of quality awarded by the Touring Club Italiano to small towns (population 15,000 or less) in Italy for excellency in tourism, hospitality and the environment.

This recognition was established in 1998 in Liguria, in response to a regional institution's demand to foster and promote the Italian hinterland. The Touring Club Italiano (TCI) developed an analytical model to identify the first towns recognized with the Bandiera arancione. Later the recognition was adopted on nationwide scale to identify sites of excellence in all regions of Italy.

This is the only Italian project of its kind to be listed by the World Tourism Organization among successful programs for the sustainable development of tourism around the world.

== Goals ==
The main assessment criteria evaluated by the TCI for the award of the Bandiera arancione are:

- use of local resources
- culture of hospitality
- fostering of local crafting and products
- encouragement of local entrepreneurship
- strengthening of the territorial identity
