= Cerreto ceramics =

Ceramic production in Cerreto Sannita and San Lorenzello, Italy

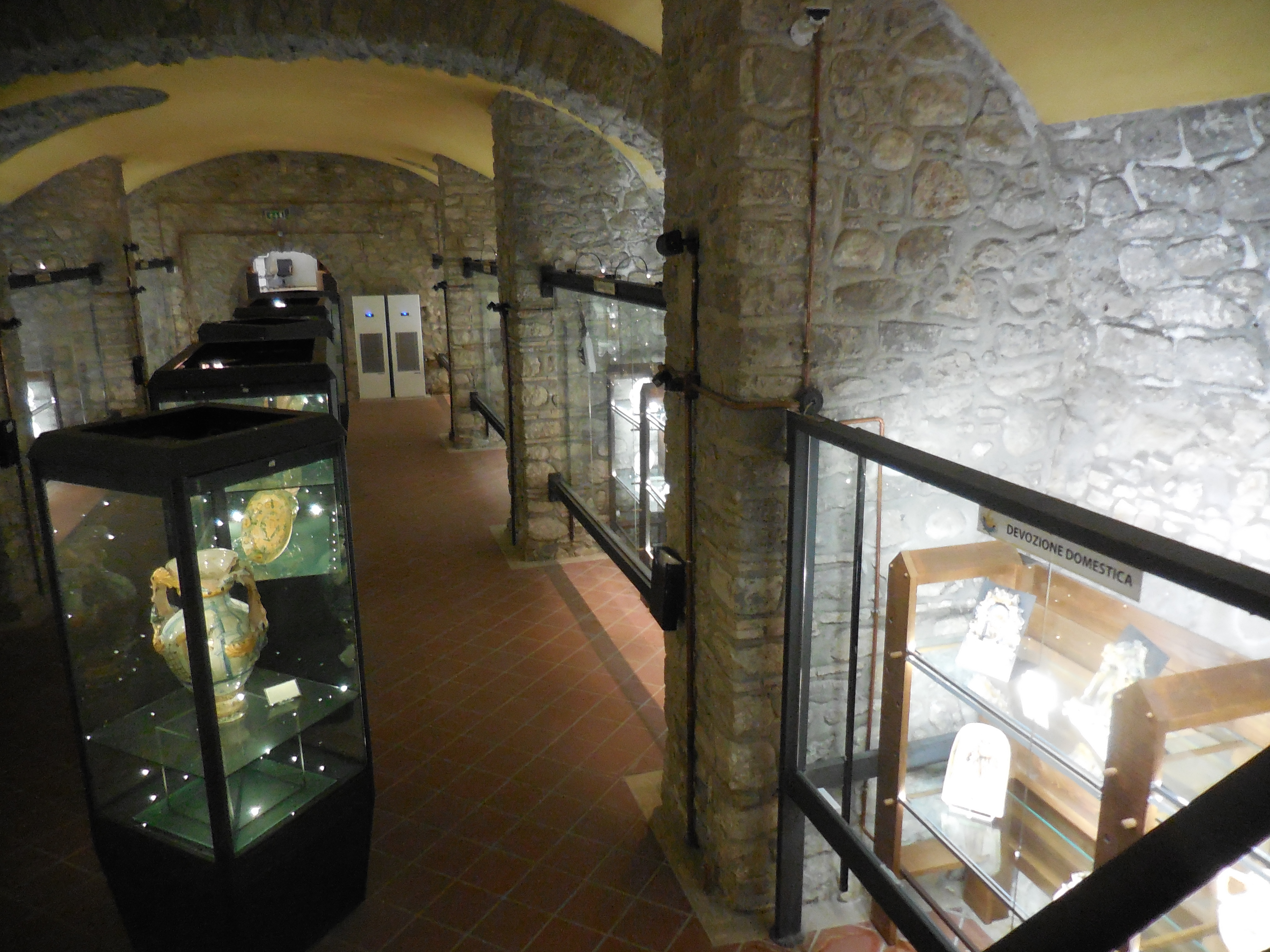
View of the Cerreto Sannita Civic and Ceramic Museum.

The term Cerreto ceramics refers to the ceramic production of the neighboring municipalities of Cerreto Sannita and San Lorenzello (Benevento). This designation combines the previous terms "Cerreto ceramics" and "Laurentina ceramics".

Cerreto ceramics, recognized by the Ministry of Industry, Commerce, and Crafts as "artistic and traditional ceramics", has ancient origins, although the most flourishing period of production was after the earthquake of 5 June 1688. The reconstruction of Cerreto Sannita attracted many foreign "faenzari" (ceramists), especially from Naples, who contributed to creating the eighteenth-century shapes and decorations that still characterize Cerreto ceramics today.

The father of Cerreto ceramics was the Neapolitan faenzaro (ceramist) Nicolò Russo, who moved to Cerreto Sannita in 1692. In his workshop, men were trained who gave rise to entire generations of Cerreto and Laurentina ceramists: Antonio Giustiniani, Domenico Marchitto, and Santi Festa. The decorator Lorenzo Salandra, one of the most important figures in Neapolitan majolica, also worked there.

== History ==
=== 14th century to the earthquake of 5 June 1688 ===
According to the scholar Salvatore Biondi, the oldest artifact of Cerreto-Laurentina ceramics would be a statuette depicting the Ecce Homo, owned by Caterina Sanframondi, the first abbess of the Monastery of the Poor Clares in Old Cerreto. The statuette, following the dispersal of Biondi’s ceramic collection, has been lost.

During excavations among the ruins of Old Cerreto, destroyed by the 1688 earthquake, numerous ceramic fragments were found, now preserved in the civic museum, testifying to the existence of ceramic production even before 1688.

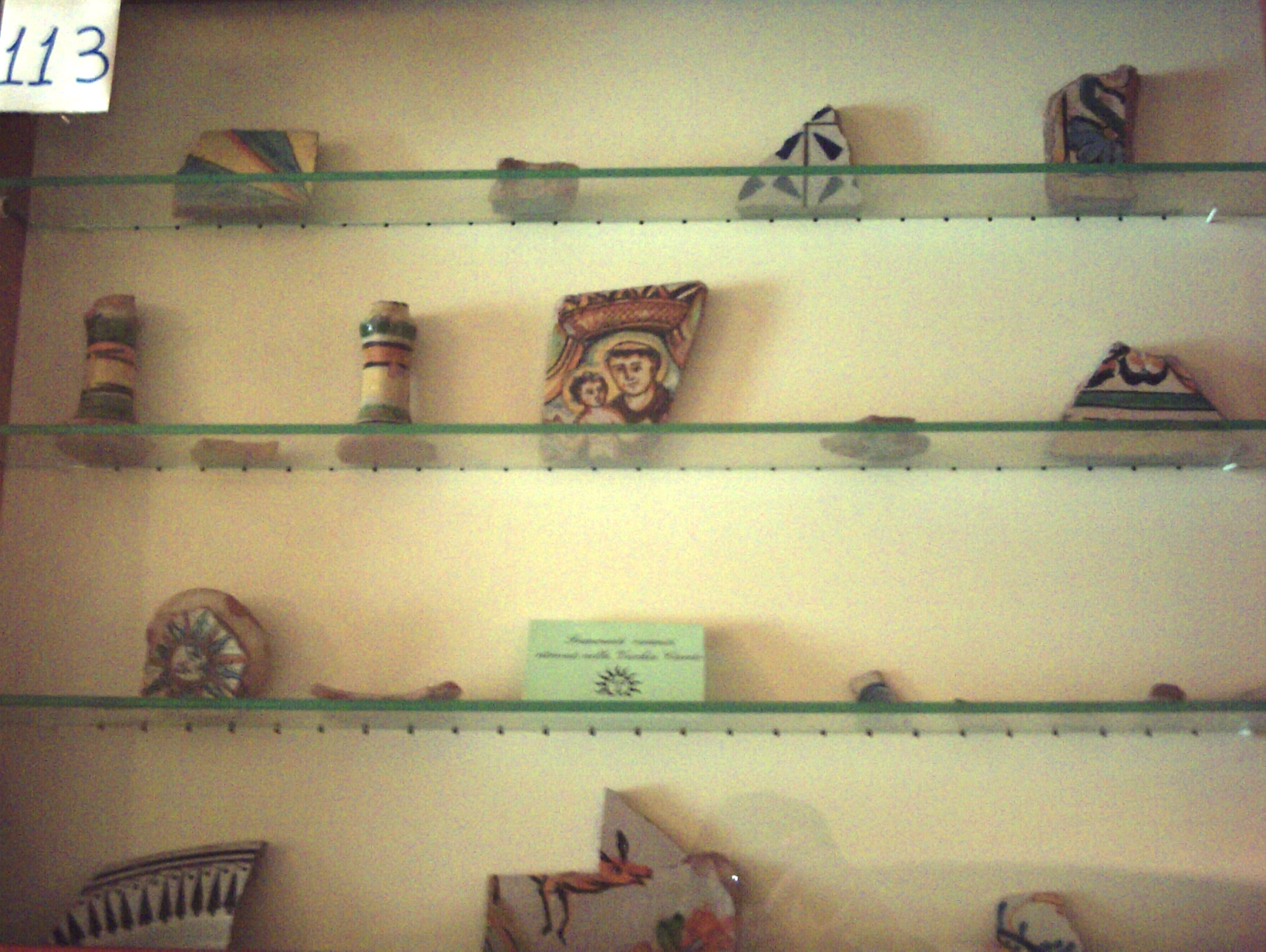
Display case in the Cerreto Sannita Civic and Ceramic Museum in Cerreto Sannita (Benevento) containing ceramic fragments found among the ruins of Old Cerreto, destroyed by the earthquake of 5 June 1688.

The local historian Nicola Rotondi, in a book written in the 19th century, noted that "in the new and old Cerreto, potters have always crafted vessels, even large ones, glazed and variously painted [...]" adding that "here (in Cerreto) this art, in the uncertainty of its rules and despite the many practitioners, only a few distinguished themselves for the delicacy of the colors and the shape [...]".

The local historian Dr. Renato Pescitelli argues that before 1688, only minor ceramists, not classifiable as "faenzari", were present in Cerreto Sannita. In support of this thesis, Pescitelli notes the lack of documents explicitly mentioning the presence of "faenzari" in Cerreto, although he acknowledges the presence of several vasai and pignatari workshops in the 17th century, as evidenced by two documents preserved in the Cerreto Sannita Diocesan Archive. The first document mentions the existence, near the Church of San Giovanni, of a street inhabited by several pignatari, while the second states that only "three small houses of a potter" survived the destruction of the earthquake of 5 June 1688. According to some historians, the absence of references to Cerreto "faenzari" in documents is because it was customary not to explicitly mention ceramic artifacts produced in Cerreto. This would explain why, in period inventories, some artifacts have their place of origin meticulously noted, while others, likely produced in Cerreto, lack such specification.

Other documents attesting to the presence in Cerreto of individuals working with ceramics before the 1688 earthquake include: a 1623 death certificate stating that "the two-year-old daughter of the potter’s brother" died; a 1634 baptismal record noting that Giovan Tommaso Papa, a "cretaro" by profession, had a son; a 1644 death certificate recording the death of Domenico di Rocco de Sania de Castello della Faenza; and a 1640 notarial deed listing various clay vessels, some fired and some unfired, among inventoried items. The oldest document dates back to 1591, when a contract was signed between the Universitas of Cerreto and the workshop of Cesare Iordanus, obligating the latter to supply 160 "clay tufoli" needed for the renovation of the public aqueduct.

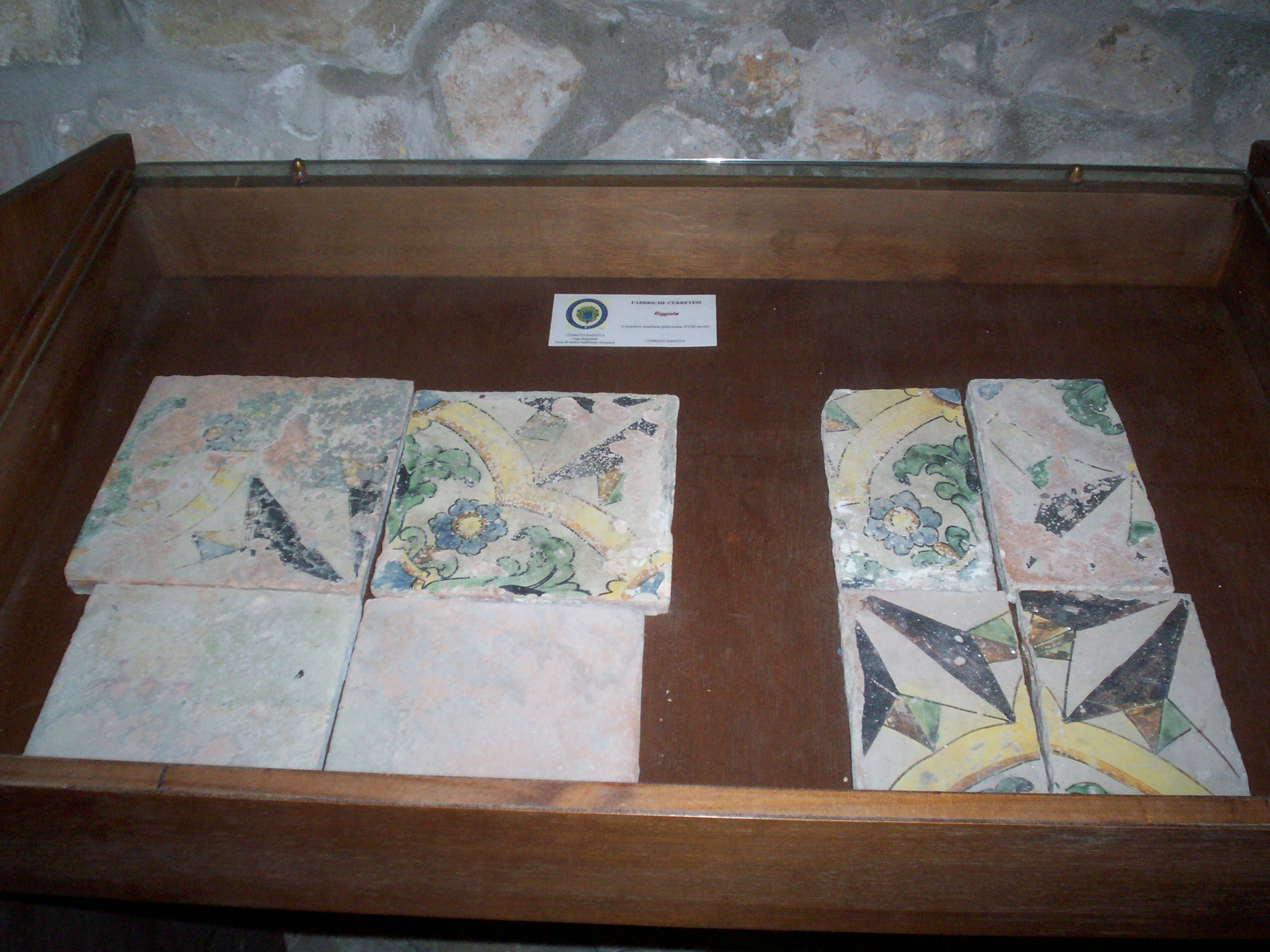
Ancient tiles in the Cerreto Sannita Civic and Ceramic Museum in Cerreto Sannita

Few Cerreto and Laurentina ceramic artifacts from the 15th–16th centuries survive today. In addition to the fragments found among the ruins of Old Cerreto and preserved in the civic museum (some dated to the medieval period), there were artifacts from Salvatore Biondi’s dispersed collection, dated by experts to the Renaissance period. During the restoration work on the Church of the Madonna del Carmine (2003), a Renaissance tile was discovered, described by Dr. Luigi Di Cosmo as follows: "[...] the tile can be dated to the second half of the 15th century due to the strong predominance of the 'cold' blue, typical of Iberian inspiration. Local ceramists were influenced by Iberian ceramics imported for royal commissions. The imports of Valencian Azulejos, commissioned by Alfonso the Magnanimous for the construction of Castel Nuovo, are well known." The tile, characterized by a Gothic-floral decorative motif (with a "crumpled leaf"), was likely part of the flooring of a representative hall in the medieval castle of Old Cerreto.

Two other surviving ceramic artifacts predating 1688 are: a majolica tile dated 1684 and a jug dated 1681, featuring the coat of arms of the Mazzacane family of Cerreto in its central part.

=== 1688 to the present ===
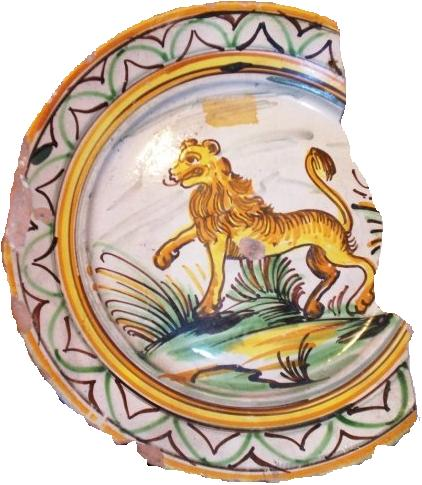
Eighteenth-century Cerreto ceramic plate preserved in the Cerreto Sannita Civic and Ceramic Museum.

The earthquake of 5 June 1688 devastated Cerreto Sannita and caused significant damage to San Lorenzello. The reconstruction of the two towns attracted numerous foreign artisans, particularly from Naples. Many ceramists settled in the two towns, contributing with their work to the creation of a new decorative repertoire more aligned with the artistic period of that era.

In the "new" Cerreto, there was a true ceramists’ quarter located near the Cerreto Sannita Cathedral. During the renovation of several buildings in that area, remains of kilns for firing terracotta and ceramics were found. In this "ceramists’ insula," there were the workshops of Francesco Iadomaso, a Cerreto native, and Carlo Coluccio from Campobasso. In the same area was the workshop of Nicolò Russo, a master faenzaro who moved from Naples in 1693. Many young apprentices worked in his workshop, becoming the main figures of Cerreto ceramics in the 18th century: Domenico Marchitto, Santi Festa, Melchiorre Cerri, Nicola and Crescenzo Petruccio, Nicola Marchitto, Salvatore Paduano, and Giuseppe Paolino. Russo created numerous works in Cerreto Sannita, including several floorings in religious buildings.

At the beginning of the 18th century, the governor of the county, Migliorini, described the ceramists’ area in Cerreto in a poem as follows:

Not far from there (the Cathedral) is the Faenza
That is, where white vessels are made
And painted with great care
You will see such fine and frank work
That if they were made of Savoy clay
They could stand beside any work.
Come, let us move on to the kilns
And their workshops, where clay is crafted
Which are truly worthy of all praise.
It is so true that if in Naples you want
A jug, for example, or a chamber pot,
Like those made here, you will not find.

In 1710, there is record of a certain Lorenzo Salandri, a Neapolitan painter, who assisted the ceramist Nicolò Russo in decorating ceramics. Other ceramists who moved to Cerreto included Nicola di Gemma, Domenico Scarano, Giuseppe Buonanotte, Giuseppe Giustiniani, and Antonio Gaudioso. In 1723, the workshop of Giuseppe Jacobelli, father of Silvestro Jacobelli, a sculptor, was mentioned. In 1735, there is record of a workshop with a kiln owned by Filippo and Giovan Camillo Petrucci, located near the current Via Fabbri.

Meanwhile, in 1706, Antonio Giustiniano (or Giustiniani), a Neapolitan and son of Simone and father of the more famous Nicola, settled in San Lorenzello. Antonio Giustiniani, from a family of floor decorators (Ignazio, a relative, created the splendid flooring of the Church of Sant'Andrea delle Dame in Naples), produced several works, including the majolica panel set in the tympanum of the portal of the Congregation of Health Church in San Lorenzello. This panel depicts the Madonna of Health, seated on clouds, holding the child. Floral decorations with tulips adorn the sacred scene. Antonio Giustiniani also created numerous ceramics preserved in the civic museum of Piedimonte Matese, including a Stations of the Cross.

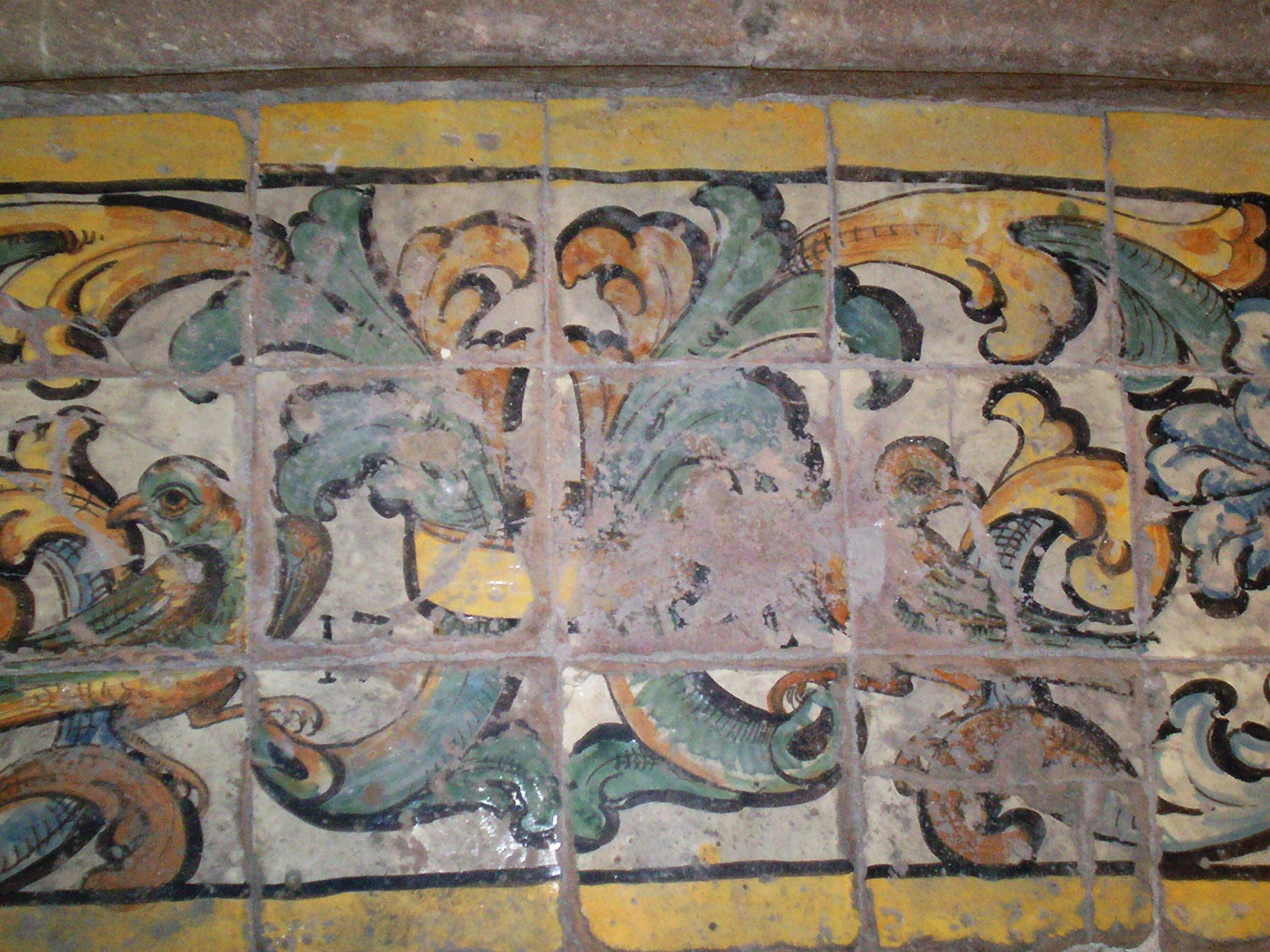
Ceramic flooring of the Church of San Gennaro created by Nicolò Russo around 1730.

Nicola Giustiniani, son of Antonio, moved to Naples in 1752, where he founded a ceramic factory in Via Marinella, where, in addition to the Giustiniani Manufacture, other Neapolitan ceramist dynasties such as the Massa, Del Vecchio, Grue, Porreca, and Chianese worked. They also produced Neapolitan nativity scene miniatures, i.e., small colored ceramic tableware to set the tables of the inn in the nativity scene.

In Cerreto Sannita, in the first half of the 18th century, Domenico Marchitto, a pupil of Nicolò Russo and progenitor of a dynasty of ceramists active in Cerreto until the 19th century, rose to prominence. Domenico Marchitto’s workshop was located near the Church of Santa Maria in Cerreto Sannita in a house whose facade still displays two majolica panels depicting the Assumption of the Virgin and the Marchitto coat of arms, created in 1758 and 1752, respectively. Carmelo and Giuseppe Marchitto were the authors of the majolica lunette above the entrance to the Church of San Donato in San Lorenzello (now preserved in the ceramic exhibition of the Giustiniano Association), while Tommaso was a skilled imitator of Etruscan ceramics. The latter, in partnership with the Duke of Pescolanciano, founded a renowned ceramic factory in Naples.

In 1742, thanks to the introduction by King Charles of Bourbon of the onciario cadastre, it was possible to discover that in Cerreto Sannita there were four faenzari, five pignatari, two rovagnari, and three canalari, all involved in clay processing and ceramic production.

From the 17th–18th centuries, the most flourishing period of ceramic production in Cerreto Sannita and San Lorenzello, numerous artifacts have survived (preserved in the Cerreto Sannita Civic and Ceramic Museum or in the permanent ceramic exhibition curated by the “Giustiniano” Association), along with some examples of floorings. The earliest, chronologically, is likely that of the pronaos of the Monastery of the Poor Clares in Cerreto. The large quadrangular hall features a majolica floor decorated with wind roses and garlands. This decoration is repeated in the flooring of the last chapel on the left in the Collegiate Church of San Martino, likely created by Nicolò Russo and Lorenzo Salandra. Also noteworthy in Cerreto Sannita are the flooring of the penultimate chapel on the left in the collegiate church, created by Domenico Marchitto in 1728, which anticipates the decorative theme used by Nicolò Russo in the flooring of the Church of San Gennaro, particularly in the predella of the main altar, where birds embellish naturalistic motifs. The floorings of the Rosary Chapel in the Church of Sant'Antonio in Cerreto Sannita and the Church of San Giuseppe stand out from traditional decorations, featuring less vibrant colors.

In San Lorenzello, the flooring of the Church of the Congregation of Health, created in the second half of the 18th century, features a rich decoration centered on the traditional "wind rose" motif. The presbytery flooring, dated 1798, was created by the Festa family, Laurentina ceramists.

In the 19th century, around forty ceramists worked in Cerreto Sannita, but their numbers gradually dwindled until only vasai or cocciolari remained.

In the mid-20th century, interest in this ancient art form was revived thanks to numerous exhibitions organized by Salvatore Biondi and the initiative of some young ceramists.

In 1957, the Cerreto Sannita State Art Institute was founded. In the following decades, numerous workshops were opened, competitions were held, museums were established, and various cultural initiatives took place.

== Ceramic production ==
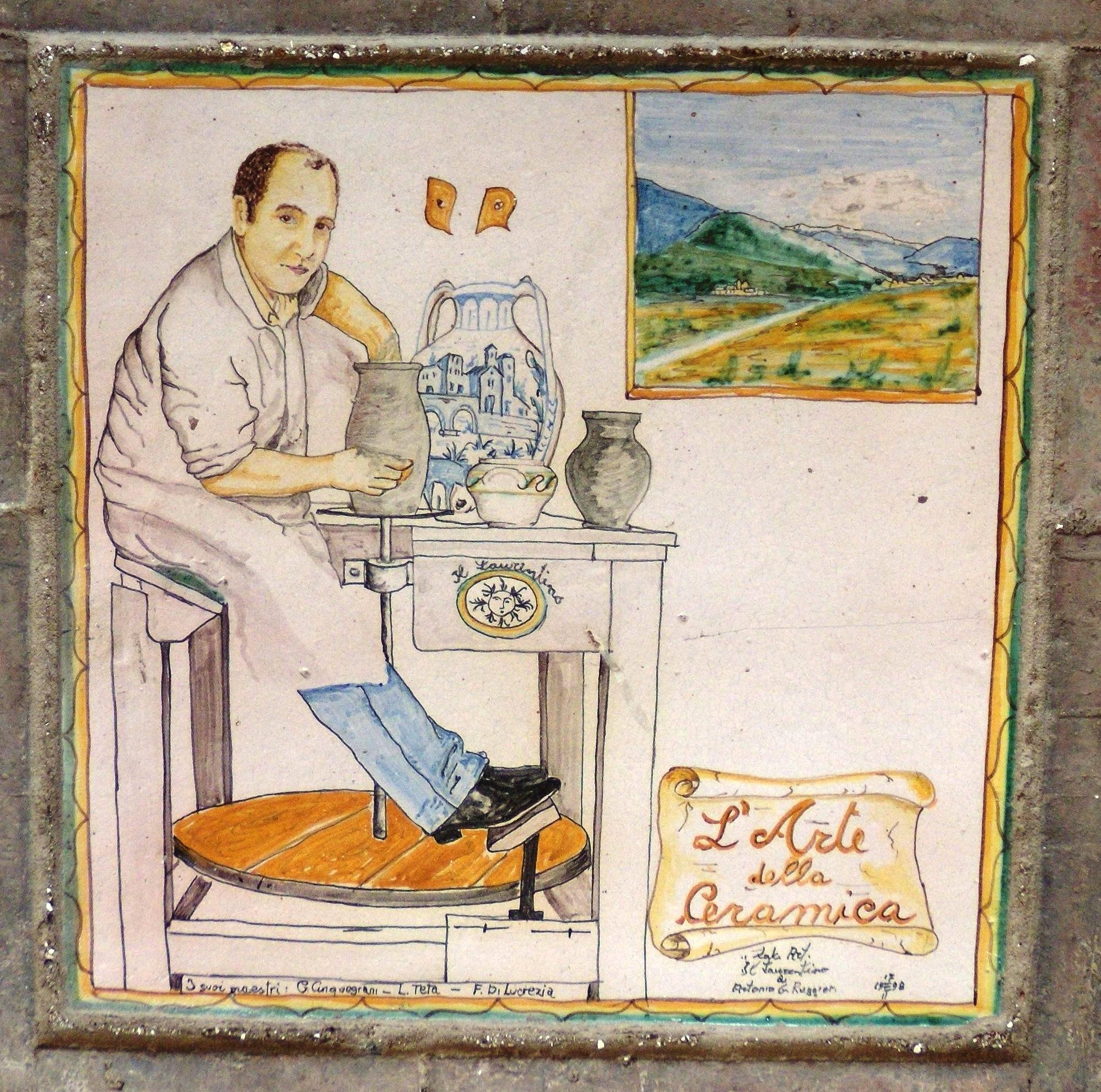
Majolica panel depicting a local ceramist working at the wheel (cloister of Palazzo Sant'Antonio, Cerreto Sannita).

Since 2001, the ceramic production of Cerreto Sannita and San Lorenzello has been regulated by a disciplinary approved by the Consiglio nazionale ceramico on 21 November 2001.

Typical Cerreto artifacts include ceremonial plates, pharmacy jars, lobed jugs, holy water fonts, and "riggiole" (tiles) with wind rose or garland decorations. The majority of artifacts feature decorations with religious, naturalistic, or landscape motifs.

Article 4 of the ceramic disciplinary meticulously lists the shapes of the Cerreto Sannita and San Lorenzello ceramic tradition: service plates have a double grooved rim with an average size of 23–24 cm; tureens, of various sizes, are adorned with raised fruit on the lid; medium and large holy water fonts feature architectural, floral, and sacred plastic elements; the shape of holy water fonts is temple-like; pharmaceutical albarelli have a rounded lower body with a flared rim and no lid; oil lamps have one or two handles.

Article 5 of the ceramic disciplinary lists the stylistic features of the Cerreto Sannita and San Lorenzello ceramic tradition. In the 17th century, ivory-colored glaze prevailed, with decorations in a compendiario style (summarized and simple, with essential and sober motifs) or faunal-floral or landscape styles. In the 18th century, the glaze was "grayish-blue white," with decorations influenced by Baroque taste, predominantly floral and landscape. In the 19th century, the glaze was slightly yellowish, with prevailing geometric or compendiario decorations.

The traditional colors of the 17th–18th centuries were yellow, copper green, Cerreto blue, and orange.

== Criticism ==
According to Judge Vincenzo Mazzacane, a local historian and ceramic collector, the most notable figures in Cerreto ceramics were the Giustiniani and Marchitto families. However, this judgment has been surpassed over time due to subsequent studies. In particular, the ceramologist Guido Donatone highlighted the pivotal role of the ceramist Nicolò Russo and his workshop, where men were trained who gave rise to entire generations of ceramists (the Giustiniani, Marchitto, and Festa families) and where Lorenzo Salandra, a "key figure in Neapolitan majolica," worked as a decorator. The local historian Cosimo Formichella further noted that Mazzacane’s judgment does not account for the local craftsmanship "present before the 1688 earthquake," considered the "basis" and "foundation" of the more famous 18th-century Cerreto ceramic art.

The art historian Mario Rotili, unlike Mazzacane, emphasizes the artistic value derived from the works of humbler ceramists, as it is precisely their spontaneity that allowed Cerreto ceramics to define themselves, avoiding mere imitations of other manufactures.

Guido Piovene states that Cerreto ceramics are similar to the ceramics of Castelli in Abruzzo, though with a more decorative taste and lighter design. Umberto Tergolina-Gislanzoni-Brasco, who studied Cerreto pharmacy jars (albarelli) in particular, claims that Cerreto ceramics derive from Abruzzo ceramics. The ceramologist Guido Donatone, who dedicated numerous essays and articles to Cerreto ceramics, asserts instead that Cerreto ceramics clearly derive from Neapolitan ceramics. This derivation should be seen within the "process of influences and mutual conditioning that occurred in the various expressive forms of Baroque and Rococo art."

The local historian Dante Marrocco, in one of his studies, described the decorations of Cerreto ceramics as immature, comparing them to "a young man who dies at twenty, full of desires and promises, with a budding but not fully developed culture... leaving regret for what he achieved, and even more for what he could have achieved, but above all for his spontaneous and unrefined actions." This issue was taken up by Nicola Vigliotti, another local historian, who preferred to speak of "osmosis": Naples provided Cerreto with the first master ceramists and later reclaimed them after they reached high artistic levels, excessive for the modest demands of the local market. One of the most famous cases is that of Nicola Giustiniani.

According to the painter Giuseppina Goglia, Cerreto ceramics cannot reach the level of Abruzzo ceramics in terms of panoramic and landscape decorations. According to Goglia, figures dominate in Cerreto majolica and stand out from the minimal surrounding decoration; the motifs are improvised but imbued with artistic sense.

According to the scholar S. Moffa, Cerreto ceramics became a true art form thanks to religious inspiration: the religious demand was strongly felt by the market and pushed ceramists to perfect religious iconography, thus creating true works of art.

== See also ==
- Cerreto Sannita
- San Lorenzello

== Bibliography ==
- AA.VV. (1991). Cerreto Sannita: Testimonianze d'arte tra Sette e Ottocento [Cerreto Sannita: Artistic Testimonies Between the 17th and 18th Centuries] (in Italian). Napoli: Edizioni Scientifiche Italiane.
- AA.VV. (1995). Guida di Cerreto Sannita [Guide to Cerreto Sannita] (in Italian). Cerreto Sannita: Pubblitaf.
- AA.VV. (2007). La Ceramica di Cerreto Sannita e San Lorenzello [The Ceramics of Cerreto Sannita and San Lorenzello] (in Italian). San Lorenzello: E.C.S.C.S.L.M.
- Biondi, Salvatore (1970). Storia delle antichissime ceramiche di Cerreto Sannita [History of the Ancient Ceramics of Cerreto Sannita] (in Italian).
- Formichella, Cosimo (1983). La terminologia nel lavoro della ceramica cerretese ed alcuni giudizi [Terminology in Cerreto Ceramic Work and Some Judgments] (in Italian). Piedimonte Matese: A.S.M.V.
- Donatone, Guido (1968). La Ceramica di Cerreto Sannita [The Ceramics of Cerreto Sannita] (in Italian). Benevento: Abete.
- Donatone, Guido (2012). La storia della ceramica di Cerreto Sannita [The History of Cerreto Sannita Ceramics] (in Italian). Arte’m.
- Goglia, Giuseppina (1941). Maioliche di Cerreto [Cerreto Majolica] (in Italian). Benevento: Tipografia del Sannio.
- Marrocco, Dante (1968). Le ceramiche di Cerreto [The Ceramics of Cerreto] (in Italian). Capua: A.S.S.A.
- Mazzacane, Vincenzo (1915). Ceramisti cerretesi [Cerreto Ceramists] (in Italian). Archivio Storico del Sannio Alifano.
- Pescitelli, Renato (2001). Palazzi, Case e famiglie cerretesi del XVIII secolo: la rinascita, l'urbanistica e la società di Cerreto Sannita dopo il sisma del 1688 [Palaces, Houses, and Cerreto Families of the 18th Century: The Rebirth, Urban Planning, and Society of Cerreto Sannita After the 1688 Earthquake] (in Italian). Telese Terme: Don Bosco.
- Progetto SchedaCerreto (2016). Il Museo della ceramica cerretese [The Cerreto Ceramic Museum] (in Italian). Società Operaia di Mutuo Soccorso di Cerreto Sannita.
- Pro Loco Cerreto Sannita (2003). Una passeggiata nella storia [A Walk Through History] (in Italian). Cerreto Sannita: Di Lauro.
- Rotondi, Nicola (1870). Memorie storiche di Cerreto Sannita [Historical Memories of Cerreto Sannita] (in Italian). Cerreto Sannita: unpublished manuscript preserved in the Cerreto Sannita Municipal Archive.
- Vigliotti, Nicola (1973). I Giustiniani e la ceramica cerretese [The Giustiniani and Cerreto Ceramics] (in Italian). Napoli: LER.
