= Cotugno =

Cotugno (pronounced [koˈtuɲɲo]) is an Italian surname from southern Italy, either derived from cognates of standard Italian cotogno 'quince' or from Arabic quṭn (قطن) 'cotton'. Notable people with the surname include:

- Annibale Cotugno (died 1584), Italian Roman Catholic prelate
- Domenico Cotugno (1736–1822), Italian physician
- Guillermo Cotugno (born 1995), Uruguayan footballer
- Nicolás Cotugno (born 1938), Uruguayan-Italian Roman Catholic prelate

== See also ==
- Cutugno
- Cotogni
