= Collegiate Church of San Martino (Cerreto Sannita) =

Church in Cerreto Sannita, Italy

- Collegiata di San Martino
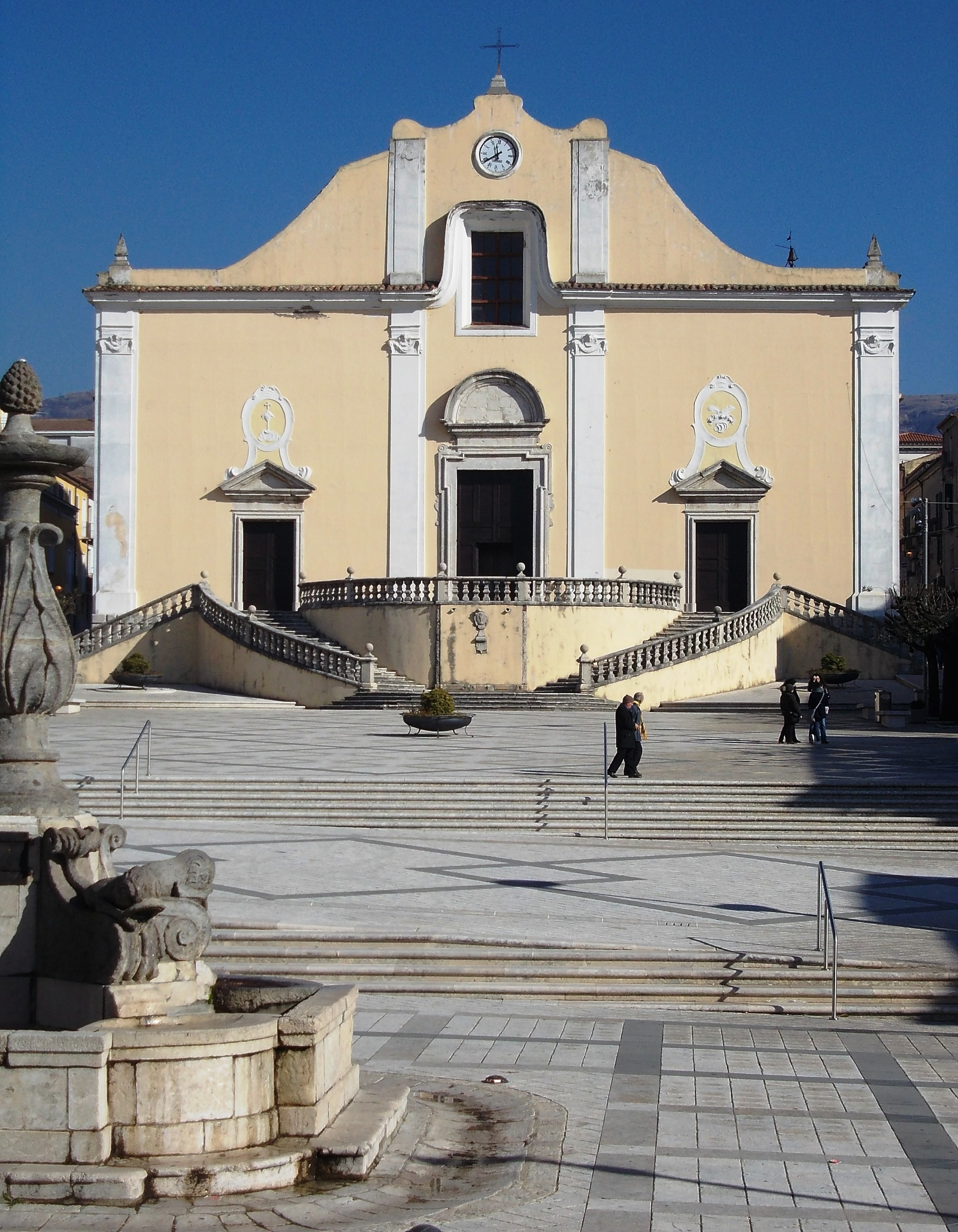
- Piazza San Martino with the Dolphin Fountain (in the foreground) and the collegiate church (in the background).

- 41°17′05″N 14°33′34″E
- Location: Cerreto Sannita, Campania, Italy
- Denomination: Catholic

History
- Dedication: Martin of Tours

Architecture
- Architect: Giovanni Battista Manni

Administration
- Diocese: Roman Catholic Diocese of Cerreto Sannita-Telese-Sant'Agata de' Goti

The collegiate church of San Martino is a religious building located in the historic center of Cerreto Sannita.

First mentioned in 972, it constituted one of the six parishes of ancient Cerreto. On February 22, 1544, Bishop Alberico Giaquinto, with the consent of Count Diomede III Carafa and the universitas (municipal administration of the time), erected the church into a collegiate church, endowing it with a chapter of eleven canons plus the archpriest and unifying the other five parishes.

Razed to the ground by the earthquake of June 5, 1688, it was rebuilt in the center of the new urban fabric desired by Count Marzio Carafa and his brother Marino, thanks to funds provided by the universitas, the confraternity of the Most Holy Body of Christ and the feudal lords.

The collegiate church, characterized by the external stone staircase that divides into four branches, with its 2,000 m^{2} (22,000 sq ft) of surface area, 58.5 m (192 ft) in length, 32.4 m (106 ft) in width and 25 m (82 ft) in height, is the largest church in the diocese of Cerreto Sannita-Telese-Sant'Agata de' Goti. Inside it are preserved numerous 18th-century paintings, valuable wooden statues, some ancient Cerretese ceramic floors, a 19th-century organ in a Baroque case, and some altars made of inlaid polychrome marble.

== History ==
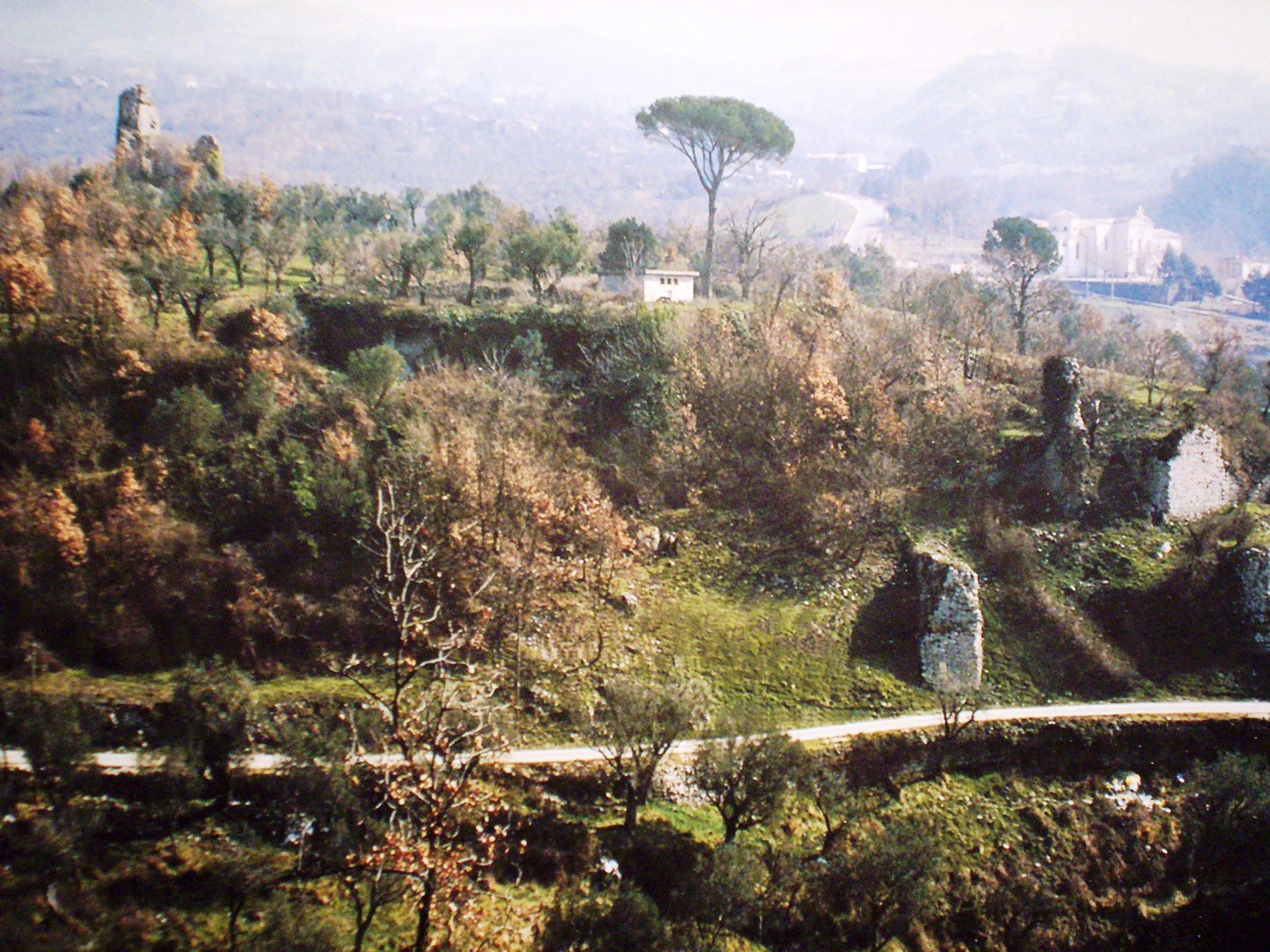
The hill where the town of ancient Cerreto stood, destroyed by the earthquake of June 5, 1688. The ruins of the medieval keep can be seen in the upper left. The church of San Martino stood in the center of the walled village.

=== The church in ancient Cerreto ===
==== From 972 to 1544 ====
The church of St. Martin of Tours is first mentioned in a diploma dated April 22, 972, kept at the library of the Sannio Museum in Benevento. This ancient document lists a series of donations that Emperor Otto I of Saxony made in favor of Abbot Azzone of St. Sofia in Benevento, and among the various donations a chapel located in Cerreto and dedicated to St. Martin is mentioned. This donation was ratified in 1022 and 1038 by Emperors Henry II and Conrad II, respectively, and in 1088 by Pope Gregory VII.

There is no other news until July 15, 1364, when Abbot Tommaso, archpriest of the church of San Martino, is counted among the witnesses to a sentence issued by the bishop of Telese Giacomo II in the litigation between the monastery of San Vittorino in Benevento and the Benedictine abbey of Santissimo Salvatore in San Salvatore Telesino. The archpriest signed himself as follows: "Ego abbas Thomas archipresbiter Cerreti testis predictus dicte sententie interfui et manu propria me subscripsi" (I Abbot Thomas, archpriest of Cerreto, was present at the statement of the aforementioned witness and by my own hand I subscribe).

At the turn of the 15th and 16th centuries the church is described as resembling a "ruined house" having a roof of "small timbers." Despite this it was one of the six parishes of ancient Cerreto and was cared for by an archpriest who celebrated the Eucharist daily.

Subsequent news comes in the first decades of the sixteenth century: in 1525 archpriest Giacomo de Blasiis accepted a substantial donation of movable and immovable property, in his capacity as rector of the church of Sant'Angelo "outside the walls"; in 1528 Don Dionisio de Donatis, archpriest of San Martino, undertook to provide sacred service in the church of San Leonardo in Cerreto, under the patronage of the universitas (municipal administration of the time); in 1540 by decree of the Holy See the tithes due to the archpriest were reduced.

By decree of February 22, 1544, Bishop Alberico Giaquinto - with the consent of Count Diomede III Carafa and the universitas - erected the church of San Martino as a collegiate church. By the same decree, Bishop Giaquinto suppressed the other five existing parishes in Cerreto (San Bartolomeo, San Biagio, San Cristoforo, Sant'Angelo and Santa Maria) and some smaller churches (San Pietro, San Giorgio, Santa Croce, San Basilio, San Gennaro, San Giacomo, San Nicola, Sant'Angelo in Sasso and San Leonardo), aggregating their rents to the newly established collegiate. The creation of a collegiate church, desired by the citizens of Cerreto already in the Civic Statutes of 1541, was also strongly desired by the clergy both for the purpose of improving the care of souls and in order to ensure a better livelihood for the priests.

The decree establishing the collegiate received apostolic assent in a provision of Pope Paul III dated April 21, 1548.

The collegiate church was endowed with a chapter consisting of eleven canons plus the archpriest. The Carafa counts reserved the right to appoint and revoke the archpriest; the latter, who had to be "able and suitable" to hold that office, could only be chosen from among priests born in Cerreto or sons of people from Cerreto.

==== From the mid-16th century to the earthquake of June 5, 1688 ====
Soon after the church was erected as a collegiate church, it became necessary to provide for the expansion of the building in order to worthily accommodate the faithful. The extension work, subsidized by the confraternity of the Most Holy Body of Christ of Cerreto, proceeded little by little and was completed by the end of the 16th century.

In 1596 Bishop Eugenio Savino noted that the architecture had a Latin cross plan with the nave divided from the aisles by eight arches on each side. Despite this, the collegiate church was not sufficient to accommodate all the people of Cerreto, who numbered about ten thousand at that time.

The church had, in addition to the high altar, twenty other altars distributed in as many chapels. In a niche to the side of the high altar on May 5, 1596, during a solemn ceremony, the relics of several saints from the falling cathedral of the Holy Cross in Telese were placed.

Among the various chapels were:

- the Chapel of the Holy Cross, built at the behest of Baron Pietro Mazzacane. In the first half of the seventeenth century it enjoyed such a large income that 156 Masses a year were celebrated there;
- the chapel of St. Catherine, built at the behest of Baron Mario Ciaburro. Located in the penultimate left aisle, it was furnished with an altarpiece depicting the Stories from the Life of St. Catherine, painted in 1594 by Annibale Scattone and valued at 55 ducats.
- the chapel of Santa Maria della Pietà, built by Bishop Annibale Cotugno, who in 1580 endowed it with various furnishings worth a total of 150 ducats. This chapel had a burial ground that was used to inter the Cerreto bishops until the completion of St. Leonard's Cathedral.

The ceiling of the central nave was covered with gold leaf while the apse was entirely frescoed.

The church, which was located in the middle of the walled village of ancient Cerreto, overlooked a square.

Originally the bells found their place on the sacristy, but in 1616, thanks to a substantial donation made by the Cerreto resident Antonio Castelli, it was possible to hold a public auction for the purpose of building a bell tower. The bell tower of the collegiate church, admired by citizens and outsiders alike for its grandeur and height, was similar to the bell tower of the basilica sanctuary of Santa Maria del Carmine Maggiore in Naples.

The June 5, 1688 earthquake razed ancient Cerreto and the collegiate church to the ground. Archpriest Andrea Mazzacane and two canons died under the rubble.

One of the eight saved canons of the collegiate church, Giovan Lorenzo Dalio, thus expressed himself about the collapse of the bell tower and the church in the elegy "The Fall of Cerreto by the Earthquake":

[...]"[...]You (the earthquake) dragged with you / the sacred golden tower
Eighth wonder / of thy divine patron
[...] [...] And thou, Martin divine / thou shouldst not perhaps,
from the starry seat / of the Father of mortals
Defend the threshold / Of thy wondrous temple?"

In the following weeks the parish service was transferred to the Church of San Giovanni (Cerreto Sannita), which escaped destruction in the earthquake.

=== The present-day church ===
==== Reconstruction ====
The decision to rebuild the town further downstream, made by Count Marzio Carafa and his brother Marino Carafa, induced the administrators of the collegiate church to occupy a large portion of land owned by noblewoman Angela Feo. The occupied area, 190.5 palms long and 123 wide (about 50 meters by 30 meters), was valued at 53.94 ducats, but only 40.94 ducats were paid, the owner having donated 13 ducats.

The site chosen to rebuild the collegiate church was in the center of the new urban fabric, in a dominant position in relation to the square in front of it.

The reconstruction of the collegiate church was expressly desired by the Carafa feudal lords, and for this purpose Count Marzio delegated Antonio Gennarello to supervise the construction site. Gennarello himself attested in a 1699 document that "[...] if it were not for the Lord Duke said church would not have been built."

Thanks also to a donation of 207 ducats from Marino Carafa, the building site proceeded very quickly so that after a few months the masons (Orazio, Giuseppe, Nicola Paduano and Giovanni Giamei) delivered an initial room. This room, called the new church by Gennarello, was a simple room facing west equipped with an altar and two burials. On July 21, 1689, the first mass was celebrated there, at the end of which fireworks were fired to celebrate the happy event.

The final design of the church, drawn up by royal engineer Giovanni Battista Manni, was delivered in 1690 by Count Marzio Carafa to Gennarello along with another two hundred ducats to finance the construction site.

The county governor Migliorini, who visited the construction site of the collegiate church in the 1690s, wrote the following lines:

"[...] In the middle of the earth (city) or even near
there stands a Church which is named and called
commonly of Saint Martin.
[...] [...] It is not finished, but it is comforting
To see some pillars completed
Above which regal thoughts fly.
And for three arches that are drawn therein
It seems that three arches must have the church
[...] [...] But why does it matter exorbitant expense
If its Lord does not repent in favour
Always shall the end thereof be suspended.
It has a great square ahead and in truth
Is so gentle and noble that it seems
To serve as a throne to his majesty."

In 1696 the transept was completed, which, enclosed on the sides by temporary walls, served as the church until 1733.

The death of Antonio Gennarello and the Carafa feudal lords induced the confraternity of the Most Holy Body of Christ to take on the expenses of the building site. Therefore, in the early years of the 18th century, a contract was made between the confraternity's bursars and the masons Orazio and Nicola Paduano, Antonio Fazzino, Giuseppe Marchitto, Cesare Calvitto, and Marco Antonio Terrera. By 1713 the masons delivered the left aisle and, a few years later, the right aisle as well.

On February 4, 1719, the final contract for the work was signed between Andrea Salvatore of Cerreto and the bursars of the Confraternity of the Most Holy Body of Christ. Andrea Salvatore undertook, within the term of three years, to "perfect all the premises of the said Collegiate Church," and in particular to complete: the stone portals, the vaults of the central nave, the plastering of the three aisles and chapels, the curling of the exterior walls, the canopy and the floor in "rolled bricks." The bursars, in return, undertook to grant Salvatore for ten years the "sheep farm" owned by the confraternity, which consisted of 4601 sheep and 1297 mares. The contracted work was worth 3,692 ducats (equal to about 500,000 euros).

In 1733 the bursars of the confraternity of the Most Holy Body of Christ announced a call for tenders for the construction of the four access staircases that were to be built according to the design drawn up by royal engineer Bartolomeo Tritta. The tender was won by master stonemason Antonio Di Lella who offered 250 ducats against Giovanni Sanzaro's 300. The work was delivered in early 1734, but as the master complained that he had suffered a loss instead of a gain, the viscount Alfonso Guarino ruled that another 50 ducats be awarded to Antonio Di Lella.

Finally, in the 1730s, the presbytery, apse, choir and sacristy were built.

==== From the mid-18th century to the present ====
On May 25, 1761, the treasurers of the confraternity of the Most Holy Body of Christ entrusted master Giovan Battista Borrelli, a Milanese resident of Arienzo, with the execution of the stucco decorations of the naves and transept. The master also undertook to embellish the main facade and raise it about 5 meters in order to reduce the existing disproportion between height and width.

Giovan Battista Borrelli also created a large stucco depicting St. Martin on horseback that was located in the upper part of the facade. This stucco, according to local historian Nicola Rotondi, gradually peeled away until it detached completely by the end of the eighteenth century.

In 1762 Canon Luca Carizza, who came from a wealthy Cerreto family, established a college of six sacristans to which he assigned a patrimony worth 2,500 ducats.

In 1799 the iron cross was placed on the facade while in 1832 a clock was put into operation, which was provided by the municipal administration.

The earthquake of July 26, 1805 left the collegiate church unscathed in contrast to the other churches in Cerreto. The people of Cerreto attributed this to a miracle of Our Lady of Grace, whose wooden sculpture had been brought to the collegiate church for a few days.

Bishop Luigi Sodo between 1854 and 1856 provided the church with the relics of Saints Victor, Justus, Aurelius, Apollonia, Lucy and Blaise, which were placed in several altars.

With the abolition of the legal personality of collegiate churches (1867) the church, while remaining a parish, lost its chapter of canons. In the same year, the municipality of Cerreto Sannita revoked the monthly allowance owed to the archpriest, but the archpriest undertook a long and costly court dispute in the hope of regaining the subsidy. The final judgment, issued in 1901, rejected all of the archpriest's claims.

During World War I, the church had to accommodate as many as two thousand troops of the XXXI Infantry Regiment of the Siena Brigade following a request from the prefect addressed to Mayor Armando Ungaro. The soldiers caused quite a bit of damage to sacred furniture and furnishings, so much so that Bishop Msgr. Ianacchino sent a laconic note to Archpriest Francesco Ciaburri with the words "the provisions of the Ministry's telegram be observed in order to avoid greater evils. I bless you."

After the 1980 Irpinia earthquake, the collegiate church underwent extensive restoration work during which the walls and roof were consolidated, the hall was painted and new marble flooring was installed. In 2009 another restoration operation restored the original colors of the transept, dome, apse and fifth chapel of the left aisle.

=== The relationship between the collegiate and cathedral chapters ===
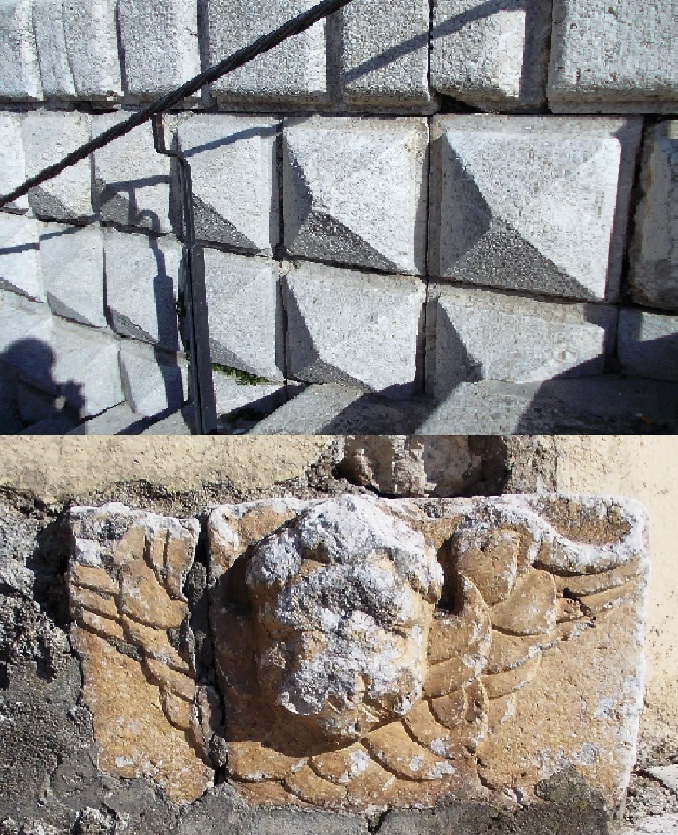
During the construction of the exterior staircase of the collegiate church, stone material from the old collegiate church of ancient Cerreto, which was destroyed in the earthquake of June 5, 1688, was inserted. Top: diamond-pointed ashlar. Bottom: putto in high relief.

In 1609, Bishop Msgr. Giovanni Francesco Leone appealed to the Congregation for Bishops requesting the definitive transfer of episcopal and canonical functions from Telese to Cerreto "in view of the fact that both the canons and the Duke himself agree that any further permanent stay in Telese is impossible because of the deplorable state of the Cathedral, the malignity of the air, the desolation of the city, left without people, the pernicious existence of mofettas and stagnant and swampy waters, and also because the canons, in order to travel to Telese from the neighboring towns, suffered disasters and were assaulted on the road by thieves who hid in the nearby woods of Mount Pugliano." The congregation, after ascertaining what the bishop described, ordered the transfer of episcopal service from Telese to Cerreto by decree on May 22, 1612.

The collegiates (the archpriest and canons of the collegiate church) did not welcome the transfer of the bishop and cathedral chapter from Telese to Cerreto, seeing the episcopal canons as dangerous competitors. At first the collegiates tried to have the 1612 decree annulled but, given the numerous failures they collected, they had to limit themselves to obstructing the work of the bishop and his canons.

In 1614 the collegiates broke into the cathedral creating havoc while holy mass was being celebrated, while in 1617 they suddenly and without reason abandoned a procession led by the bishop. In 1618 two other serious episodes occurred: the collegiates on the occasion of the pastoral visit not only refused to accompany the bishop (as was the tradition) from the bishop's palace to the church but, as soon as the Lenten sermon was over, they (according to a testimony of the time) "fled without greeting, some to the choir, some to the sacristy, with such ill manner that the seculars remained astonished." The following year the collegiates asked the Congregation for Bishops to cancel the order given verbally by the bishop not to wear caps in church in his presence.

Another more egregious quarrel occurred in 1624 when Cerreto-born Beatrice de Martino, on the verge of death, arranged to be buried in the cathedral. During the funeral some collegiates broke in and claimed the right to conduct the service since the last rites had been given by a canon of the collegiate church. It then came to a physical confrontation, and canons Don Bernardino de Palma (of the collegiate) and Don Giovan Antonio Giamei (of the cathedral) were injured with crosses. Two years later the archpriest of the collegiate church Don Pietro Lanni cursed at the point of death a dying man who had chosen to be buried in the cathedral.

The climax of disputes between the two chapters was reached during the feast of Corpus Christi in 1638. This celebration was traditionally presided over by the bishop but, since the bishop was in Rome that year, the rite had to be held by the archdeacon of the cathedral. The collegiates, unwilling to submit to the archdeacon, armed with their monstrance, made their way to the cathedral where almost simultaneously two holy masses were held by the canons of the cathedral (at the high altar) and by the collegiates (at the altar of St. Dionysius, patronage of the Mazzacane family), respectively. When the celebration was over, the two priests, after taking their respective monstrances, headed for the door. In the procession the collegiates, also with the help of the viscount's personal guards, were able to arrange themselves in front of the canons of the cathedral. The majority of the faithful arranged themselves behind the collegiates, leaving the cathedral canons behind; the latter, from behind, began fiddling with candles giving them to the faithful who had chosen to follow the collegiates. When the procession arrived in the collegiate church, the archpriest arranged to close the church door and not allow the cathedral canons to enter. People cried out in scandal, and in the trial that was later instructed at the bishop's curia many witnesses asserted that sooner or later the world would collapse because of the striking disunion of the two chapters.

The earthquake of June 5, 1688 calmed the tempers of the priests, and for many years there was a period of relative serenity interrupted only by a few sporadic misunderstandings that were immediately resolved. The last quarrel between the two chapters, dating back to 1886, concerned the division of burial rights and the regulation of the Corpus Christi procession.

The people of Cerreto, in order to avoid the recurrence of these disputes, asked the Congregation for Bishops in 1617 for the establishment of a second parish in the cathedral. In the request it was proposed to assign to the cathedral all the people of Cerreto residing outside the walls of ancient Cerreto, while the collegiate church was to be left with only the care of the faithful domiciled in the historic center. In 1647, probably because of the increase in population (which in that year numbered about ten thousand), the people of Cerreto wrote a new petition in order to establish a second parish in the cathedral and a third parish in the church of San Biagio. Both requests, it is not known for what reason, were not considered by the ecclesiastical authorities. Only after more than three centuries, in 1962, was a second parish named after the Sacred Heart of Jesus established in the cathedral.

=== The Confraternity of the Most Holy Body of Christ ===
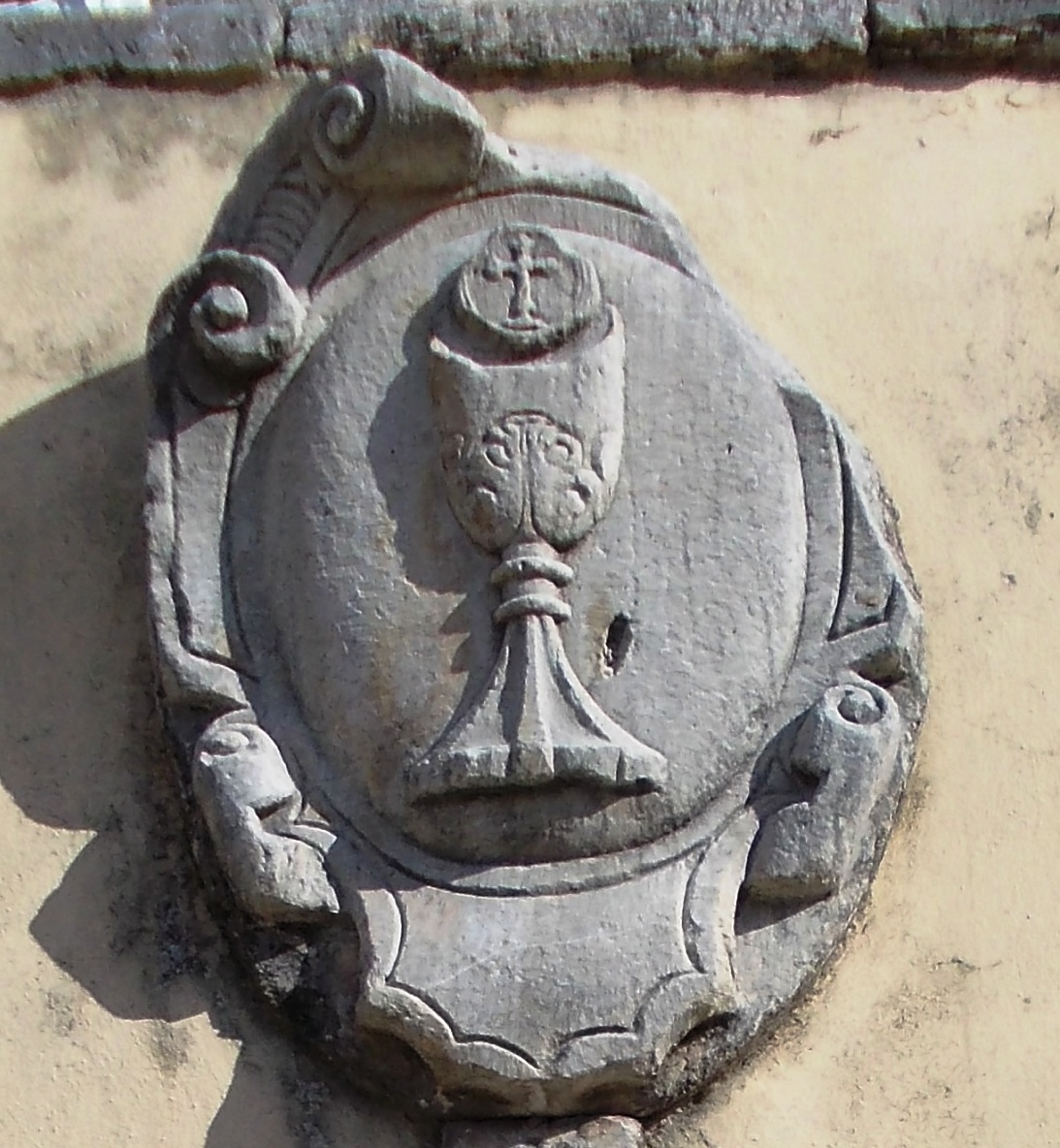
Stone coat of arms of the confraternity placed at the base of the steps (1733).

The church was home from the 16th to the 19th century to the confraternity of the Most Holy Body of Christ, which played a very important role in the reconstruction of the collegiate church after the earthquake of June 5, 1688, and in the social life of the people of Cerreto. This lay association, formed in 1580, was governed by a governor and two treasurers elected annually by the brethren and subject to episcopal jurisdiction.

The confraternity owned a rich patrimony: the main income came from a sheep farm that was leased to private citizens. In 1688 the farm, which consisted of 1669 goats and 1827 sheep, brought in an income of 1112 ducats, which increased in the following years.

Thanks to its substantial financial resources, the confraternity first worked to enlarge and embellish the old collegiate church of ancient Cerreto, also equipping it with a large tabernacle, purchased in Naples in 1596, and then to bring to completion the building site of the new collegiate church after the 1688 earthquake.

In the 18th century, the confraternity found itself managing, together with the confraternity of Our Lady of Constantinople and some private individuals, the entire weaving mill industry of Cerreto.

The gradual decline of Cerreto's weaving mill industry deprived the confraternity of a large chunk of its income, and the few remaining annuities passed to the bishop's refectory following a royal provision of May 15, 1857.

In addition to that of the Most Holy Body of Christ, three other confraternities had their headquarters in the collegiate church:

- The Confraternity of Christian Doctrine, first mentioned in 1618;
- the confraternity of the Seven Sorrows, established on April 27, 1721 with the assent of Father Nicola Ottoni, vicar general of the Servite Order of Naples;
- the Confraternity of the Precious Blood of Jesus, commissioned by Archpriest Raffaele Fazzini in 1834.

The collegiate church is currently devoid of confraternities.

== Description ==
=== Exterior ===
==== Facade ====
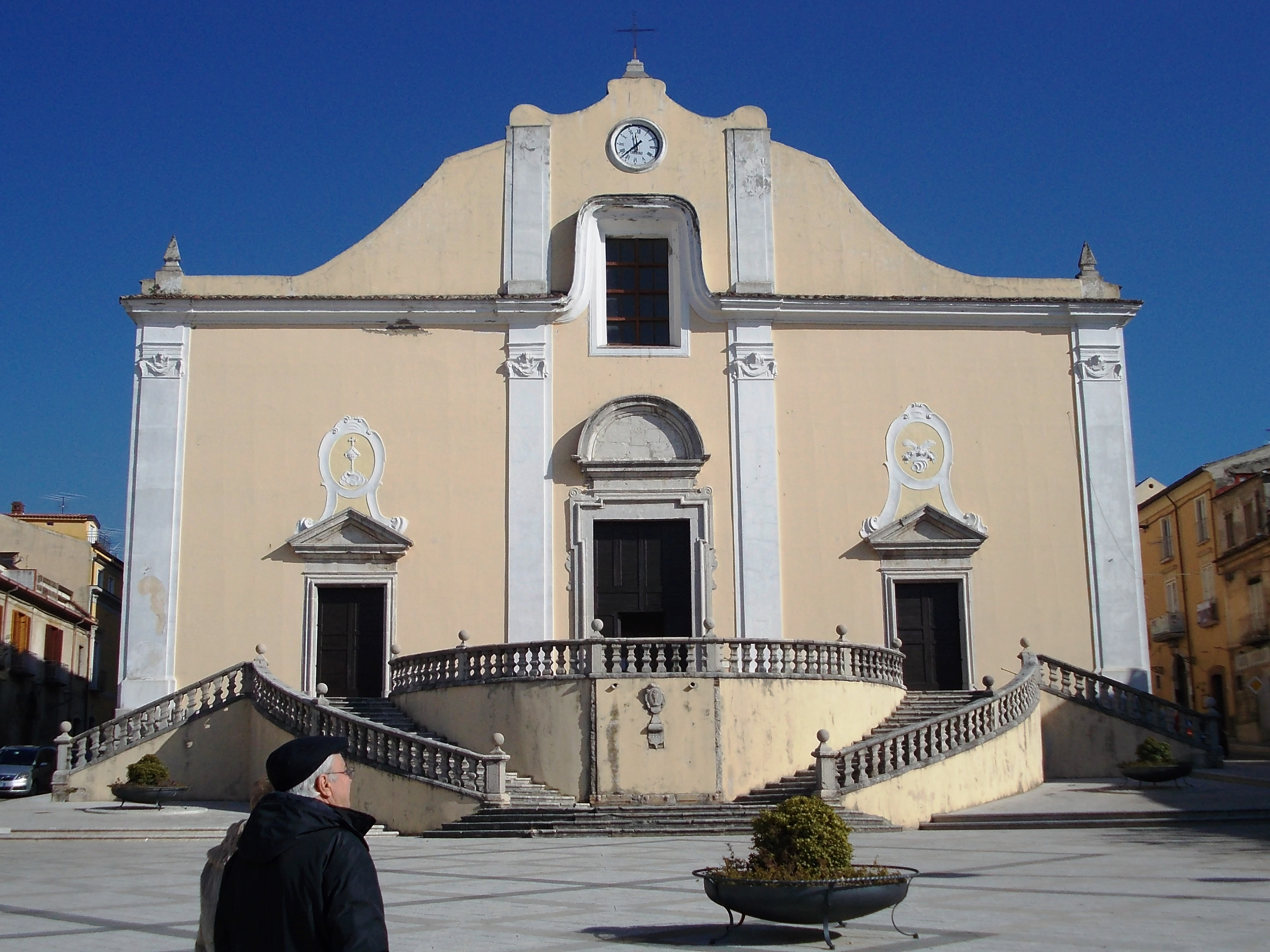
The exterior of the collegiate church with the staircases designed by royal engineer Bartolomeo Tritta and built by master Antonio Di Lella (1733).

The church of San Martino, which overlooks the square of the same name, stands in the middle of the historic center of Cerreto Sannita, opposite the Genio palace and the former feudal prisons.

The wide and airy facade is 25 meters high and rectangular in shape up to the cornice; the latter is supported by four ornamented lesenes, in the terminal parts, with stucco putti in high relief. The part of the facade above the cornice was executed in 1761 and has a shaped tympanum whose apex is surmounted by a large iron cross hoisted in 1799.

The perspective is enriched by the four flights of the stone staircase made in 1733 by Cerreto-born master stonemason Antonio di Lella to a design by royal engineer Bartolomeo Tritta. After climbing the first steps, one reaches a landing in front of which is the stone coat of arms of the confraternity of the Most Holy Body of Christ (the chalice and the host) that worked to rebuild the building. At both ends of the landing, two curved staircases ascend to the churchyard where they join the other two staircases, the latter straight, which start from Sannio Street and Corso Giuseppe D'Andrea, respectively.

The stone parapet protecting all four flights consists of 110 balusters, 15 small pillars with two half-balusters attached to the sides, and 15 spheres resting on as many cones. The magnificent stonework, in the Baroque style, takes on the function of uniting the square and the church.

The three stone portals have projecting pediments, triangular for the side portals and semicircular for the central portal. Above the side portals are two stuccoes depicting the chalice and the Holy Spirit.

Materials from the old collegiate church of ancient Cerreto were also used during the construction of the stairways. In particular, below the coat of arms of the Confraternity of the Most Holy Body of Christ can be seen carved stones with putti in high relief, while near the side portals carved stones in diamond-pointed ashlar were placed. In the center of the churchyard, on the other hand, is set a sundial from ancient Cerreto.

==== Bell tower ====
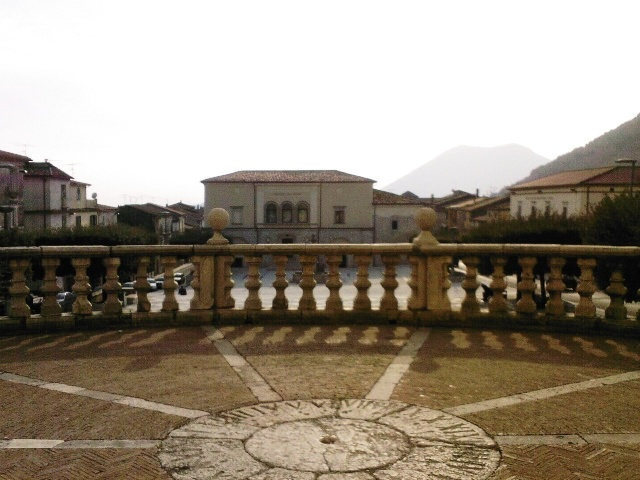
The parvis with the Roman-era sundial in the center

The bell tower faces Corso d'Andrea and is accessible through a door located in the right transept of the church. Provisionally built in the early 18th century, in 1729 it was declared "unsafe" by the bishop, who ordered it to be rebuilt in better shape. In 1732 it underwent an initial restoration, but it was only between 1742 and 1745 that the present bell tower was built at the expense of the Confraternity of the Most Holy Body of Christ.

Perhaps due to economic reasons or earthquake precautions, it could not be built according to the original design, which traced the features of the tall bell tower of the collegiate church of ancient Cerreto. The bell tower, of modest height, is devoid of significant architectural elements and possesses a solid, large base disproportionate to the walls above.

The bell tower has two fornices surmounted by a cornice and then a modest tympanum where two small bells stand out, which are connected to the clock and strike the quarter hours. In the fornices are three bronze bells that have been working electrically since 1990. The middle bell was blessed on June 19, 1731 by Bishop Francesco Baccari and the names Barbara, Angela, Maria, Aurelia were given to them.

In the right side wall of the bell tower during restoration work in the 1980s, a third fornix was brought to light that was probably part of the original bell tower refitted in 1742.

=== Interior ===
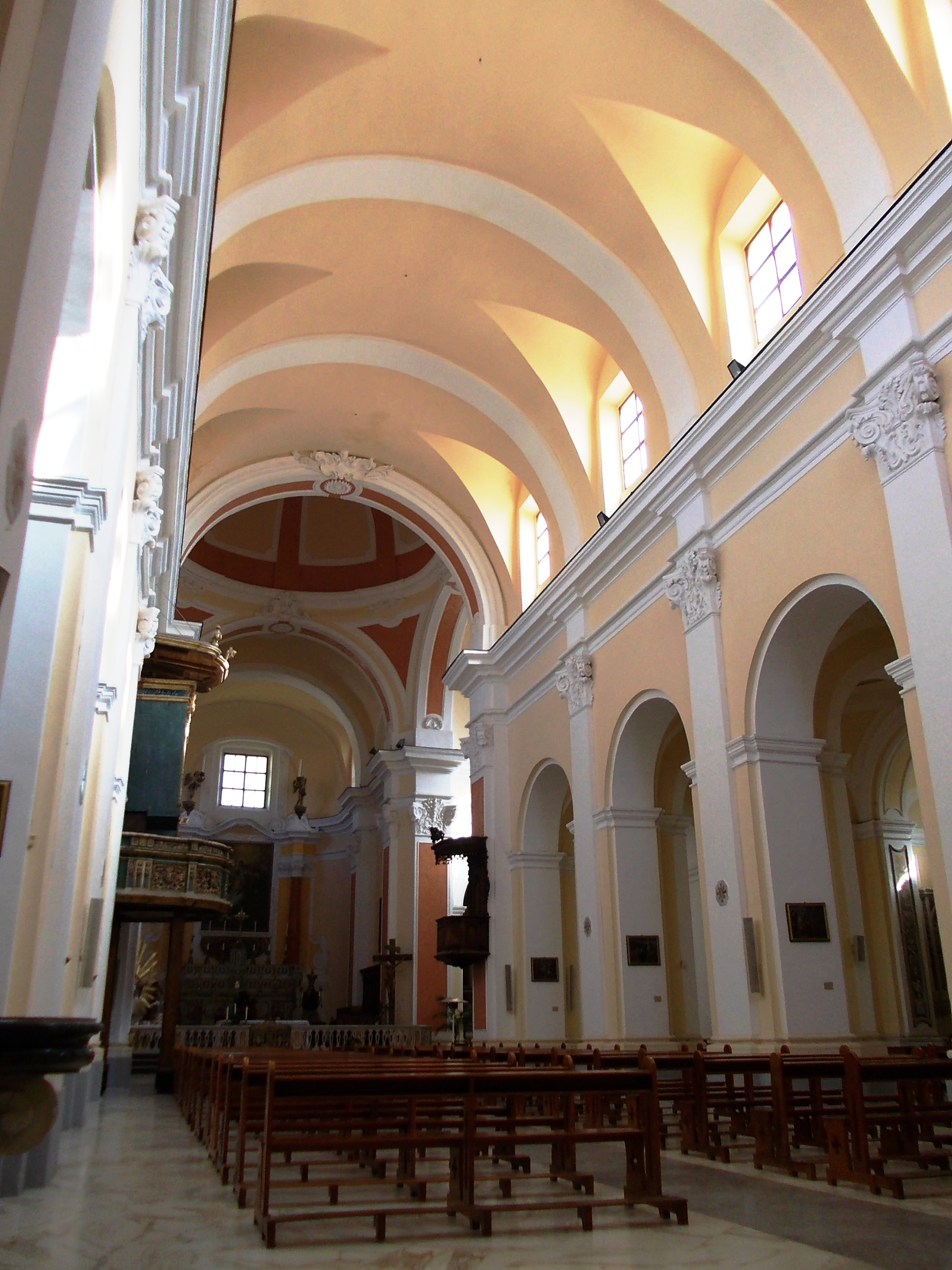
Glimpse of the central nave.

The spacious and bright interior has three naves with side chapels, transept, dome and presbytery. The collegiate church is the largest church in the diocese with an area of 2,000 sq. m. (compared to 1,600 for the Cathedral of Cerreto Sannita), a length of 58.50 meters and a width of 32.40 meters.

The aisles are separated from the central one by five arches on each side.

==== Central nave ====
The central nave was built around 1720.

The stuccoes, made by Giovanni Battista Borrelli of Milan (1761), have a neoclassical feel and are much less rich and articulate than those made by the same Borrelli in the church of San Gennaro (Cerreto Sannita).

The two large stoups, which cost 95 ducats, were made in 1739 by brothers Carmine and Gennaro Pagano of Naples. They are adjacent to the two entrance pillars and have a rich decoration of white, yellow, red, blue and dark marble.

In front of the organ stands the richly carved walnut hanging pulpit, made in 1762 by a master carpenter from Benevento. The pulpit was offered by the universitas in fulfillment of a promise signed in 1738 with the treasurers of the confraternity of the Body of Christ. The promise provided for the construction of a pulpit at the expense of the civic administration in exchange for the perpetual use of a water spring located on land owned by the collegiate. Notary Nicola Mastrobuoni thus described the pulpit as soon as it was inaugurated: "It is of all perfection and satisfaction; not only to them Mr. Governor and Bursar but also to all the canons of the said Collegiate Church, and all the people, since it is made of walnut veneer by a Beneventan Master, with carved finials [...] and walnut frame with gilding, [...] decent in a nutshell, and as the said Church sought it, so much so that a hundred ducats were spent in all [...]." The priest can access the pulpit by means of a narrow staircase carved inside the pillar.

On display in the nave are the fourteen small paintings of the Stations of the Cross, made by an unknown painter in the eighteenth century.

===== The pipe organ =====
In the last archway to the left of the nave is the organ, with a Baroque-style case. An early organ was made in 1696 by Felice Cimmino of Giugliano in Campania, Italy.

The instrument made by Cimmino was replaced in the second half of the 19th century by the present organ. The 17th-century balustrade, canopy, case and exterior decorations were part of the ancient organ of the church of St. Anthony, which, after the earthquake of July 26, 1805, remained for several decades in the storage rooms of the Cathedral of Cerreto Sannita. In 1870, the decorative structures were moved inside the collegiate church. In the same year Domenico Petillo of Naples made the mechanical part of the instrument, which is still functioning today, and in particular "wrest block, bellows and all the objects attached to the functioning of the organ." A cartouche visible inside the instrument, behind the pedal board closing panel, recalls that the organ was blessed by Bishop Luigi Sodo on Christmas night in 1870.

The elevation is tripartite and the pipes on the front are topped with rich gilded wooden racemes. The same decoration is present in the balustrade. Until Italian unification, the municipal administration paid an organist, who played during Sunday masses and on other holidays. In 1813 the organist's annual salary was 19.80 liras, compared to 440 liras for the elementary school teacher.

The instrument underwent a thorough restoration in 2007. During the restoration, the bellows were cleaned, the pressure was reset to its original state (45 m.bar.), the mullions were disassembled and painted, and the pipes, which had large cuts due to poor tuning, were repaired.

The organ has a single keyboard of 45 keys with a short first octave and a pedalboard.

Below the organ balustrade there is a painting.

==== Left nave ====
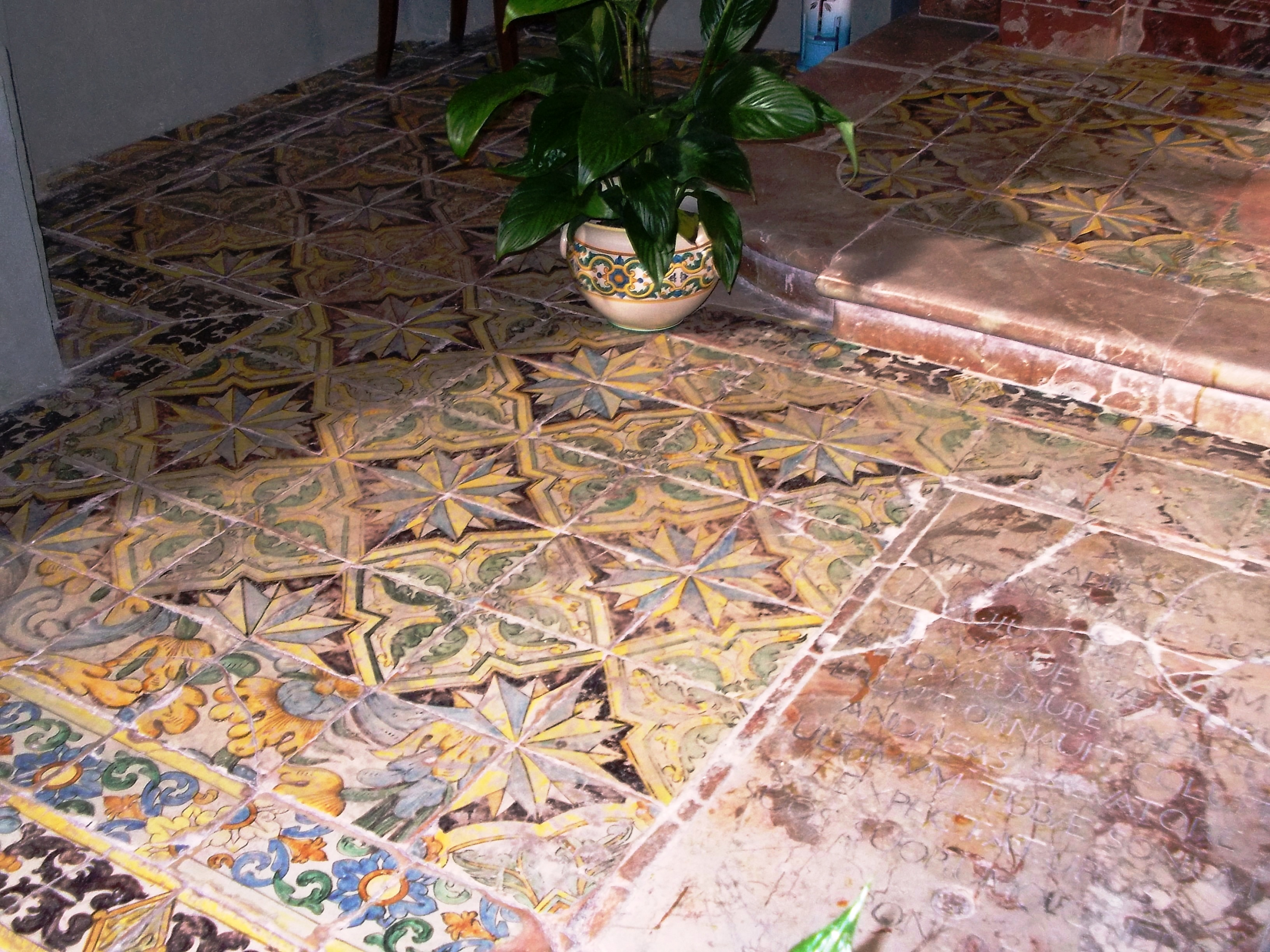
Antique ceramic floor in the fifth chapel of the left nave.

The left nave was the first of the three naves to be completed (1713). Five chapels face it:

- First chapel: small temple from the early 20th century containing the papier-mâché sculptural group of Our Lady of the Rosary. Originally the chapel was dedicated to St. Apollonia.
- Second chapel: on the altar is a statue of the Immaculate Madonna (19th century), while the walls display painted panels that used to be in the ceiling of the church of Madonna del Soccorso (Cerreto Sannita).
- Third chapel: oil on canvas by local artist Lucantonio D'Onofrio depicting Saint Andrew Avellino. The saint is immortalized as he loses consciousness during the Eucharistic celebration, amid the surprise of the faithful. Two priests support the saint while several putti witness the scene. D'Onofrio painted the canvas inspired by a work that Francesco Celebrano made for the Sanctuary of the Madonna delle Grazie (Cerreto Sannita).
- Fourth chapel: dedicated to Our Lady of Purity, it was commissioned by Luca Carizza. Completed in 1730, it is adorned with a painting in soft, luminous colors, depicting Our Lady of Purity between Saints Liborio and Joseph. Two angels crown the Virgin while in the lower right a tile disjointed from the floor shows the signature of the Neapolitan painter Paolo de Falco and the date 1727. The altar is made of pinkish marble while the floor, made of ancient ceramics, consists of wind rose and festoon motifs. The predella has a floral decoration executed by Cerreto-born ceramist Domenico Marchitto in 1728. On the side walls are St. Luke and St. Francis, two 18th-century oval canvases.
- Fifth chapel. Commissioned by Andrea Salvatore, a wealthy businessman, it was designed by Giovanni Battista Manni and was begun in 1714. The painting by Neapolitan painter Paolo de Falco depicting Our Lady of the Rosary among Saints Anthony, Dominic, Catherine and Rose dates from 1716. The painting features the Salvatore family coat of arms in the lower right corner, which is also reproduced in the stucco above the entrance arch to the chapel. The antique ceramic floor was made by Nicolò Russo and consists of wind roses and festoons in the typical colors of local 18th-century ceramics. On the side walls are St. Paschal and St. Rose of Viterbo, painted terracotta figurines. On the floor is the tomb of Andrea Salvatore, while in the space in front of the chapel is the tomb of Andrea Mazzarella, a Cerreto-born patriot and man of letters.

==== Chapel of the Blessed Sacrament ====
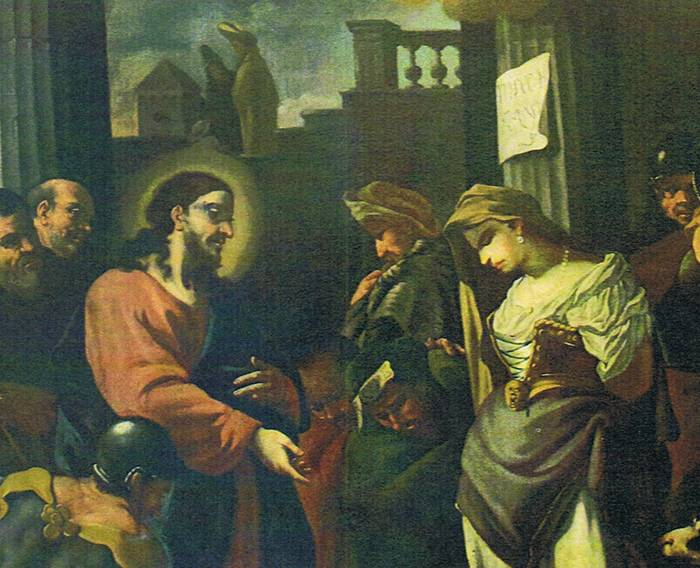
Christ with the Adulteress, oil on canvas by Lucantonio D'Onofrio (1758). The female figure caused quite a stir at the time because of her neck, left uncovered by the artist.

The chapel of the Blessed Sacrament faces the transept, to the left of those looking at the chancel. It was the first room in the church to be completed so that in July 1689, just over a year after the earthquake, it was used for the celebration of the Eucharist. The chapel as it can be seen today was not built until around 1735 when the altar in polychrome inlaid marble was commissioned, made by the Pagano brothers and cost 220 ducats. On either side of the altar the two white marble angels were redone in the 1980s after some thieves had removed the originals.

On the back wall, while waiting for a more valuable painting to be placed there, a poorly made fresco was created, so much so that in 1735 the episcopal visitor Don Vincenzo Piscitelli ordered its immediate removal because it "moveatur ad risum" (inspired laughter). During restoration work in the 1980s, traces of this fresco emerged in the plasterwork.

Now the altar is surmounted by Lucantonio D'Onofrio's Last Supper (1738). The light, within the painting, is radiated by the face of Christ and the bread, which is understood to be the bread of life and therefore a source of light. It is surrounded by a rich stucco frame.

Displayed on the right wall is another painting by D'Onofrio depicting the miracle of the manna in the desert (1741). In it Moses stands out, pointing with his rod to the miracle obtained from God.

On the left wall is another work by D'Onofrio depicting Christ with the adulteress (mid-18th century). The female figure must have caused quite a stir at the time, since the bishop vicar Don Vincenzo Pescitelli, during a visit to the church in 1758, ordered the female figure to be remade "with better form." Pescitelli ordered, meanwhile, that a cloth be spread in the nave and that the part in front of the chapel be reserved exclusively for women in order to avoid distractions and temptations to men. It is not known whether the female figure in the painting was remade or not, but no traces of remaking were found during the latest restoration work.

==== Transept ====
The ignorant canon

In 1704, the canons of the collegiate church protested vehemently against the election of Andrea Ciaburro as canon, alleging that Ciaburro was "a person totally incapable, and unfit to obtain said canonry [...] because of his notorious ignorance and illiteracy." Ciaburro, as if to exonerate himself, replied that he "never claimed to be a canon [...] the (title) of which was conferred by the goodness of the Most Illustrious Monsignor." At the turn of the seventeenth and eighteenth centuries there were many priests in the diocese who were illiterate or inadequately educated due to the lack of a diocesan seminary, which, after the earthquake of June 5, 1688, had still not been rebuilt. So much so that in a letter of 1696 Bishop Biagio Gambaro wrote, "my soul is saddened maximally because the Diocese is full of ignorance due to the lack of a seminary."

In the left arm of the transept is the altar of the Pietà or Santa Maria del Soccorso, first mentioned in 1703. By apostolic brief of Pope Benedict XIV it was declared a "privileged altar." The present marble covering dates from 1884 and was executed at the expense of the Magnati family and the Apostolate of Prayer Association. The painting above it (1750) is a work signed by Lucantonio d'Onofrio and depicts Our Lady weeping over the lifeless body of Jesus.

In the right arm of the transept is the altar of St. Michael the Archangel, covered in marble in 1883 by Canon Luigi Fazzini. The canvas (1750), attributed to Lucantonio D'Onofrio, depicts the Archangel repelling rebellious angels with his flaming sword.

In the right arm of the transept are located, within two wooden displays, two 19th-century statues depicting St. Martin the Bishop and the Sacred Heart of Jesus.

The dome, completed in 1701, consists of eight ogives that converge toward the central stucco depicting the chalice and the host.

==== Sacristy ====
The sacristy was begun in 1734 by the mason Giovanni del Nigro of Vitulano, who won the tender asking for 33 grana for each canna performed; all the materials went to the confraternity. The work after a short time was suspended by the bishop vicar because the construction was coming to rest against the garden wall of the vicar's palace, contravening civil and canonical regulations. It was thus decided to leave a narrow alley between the garden wall and the sacristy. This alley in 1811 was closed for hygienic reasons.

Eighteenth-century sculptures and canvases are preserved in the sacristy, such as a valuable painting depicting Our Lady of Sorrows by Neapolitan Gennato Sarnelli in 1730.

The eighteenth-century wooden door giving into the storeroom is richly carved.

The white marble basin is possibly the work of the Pagano brothers and is surrounded by 19th-century local majolica.

On display in the room preceding the sacristy is a collection of ancient ceramics, consisting mainly of 18th-19th-century tiles and some yellow and green majolica embers that were located on the church dome and, perhaps, on the bell tower.

==== Presbytery ====
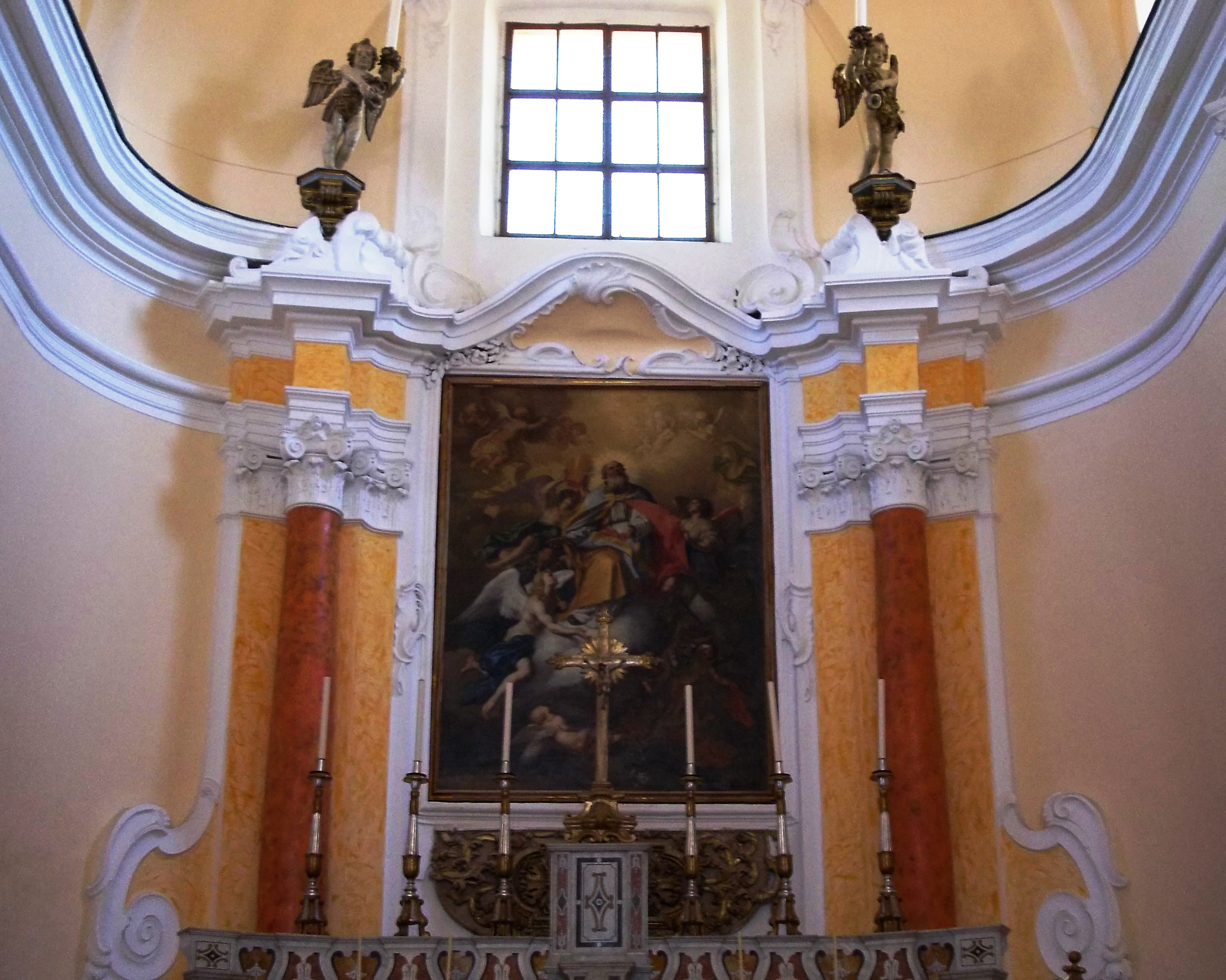
Detail of the chancel, designed by architect Giovanni Battista Antonini.

The presbytery was begun around 1730 to a design by the Neapolitan architect Giovanni Battista Antonini. The embellishment work did not occur until around 1760 when the valuable stucco work on the apse and the wooden stalls where the officials of the collegiate church sat (the archpriest, the eleven canons and the six sacristans) were done.

In 1759 the high altar was arranged in inlaid marble, the work of the Pagano brothers of Naples, at a total expense of 390 ducats. The antependium, consisting of a single slab, has a cross in the center adorned with rich floral motifs. The finial was added later to give greater momentum to the altar.

The richly carved wooden altar in front was made in 1990 by the Di Meola workshop of Cerreto Sannita.

The large painting depicting the glory of St. Martin is by Neapolitan painter Paolo de Falco (1714). The saint appears on a cloud, surrounded by numerous angels and cherubs. One angel is about to place the mitre on the head of the bishop of Tours while another angel, on the left, holds the crosier. To the right, almost hidden by the saint's shadow, an angel holds a sword, recalling the tradition of Martin the soldier, who during a cold day shared one of his cloaks with a poor man.

The two columns on either side of the large painting are topped by two lamp-holding angels, carved on wood.

On either side of the high altar are two wooden sculptures: the risen Jesus (left) and Our Lady of Libera (right), a valuable Romanesque-Byzantine style sculpture from the church of Our Lady of Libera.

The wooden crucifix, of fine workmanship, was made by the Cerreto-born mason Felice Antonio Di Crosta (1849). After the work was completed, Di Crosta was invited to study applied arts in Naples, but he declined.

On the walls are two 18th-century canvases: the Assumption of the Virgin (left, from the church of Santa Maria (Cerreto Sannita)) and the Flight into Egypt (right, from the church of San Giuseppe (Cerreto Sannita)).

==== Right nave ====
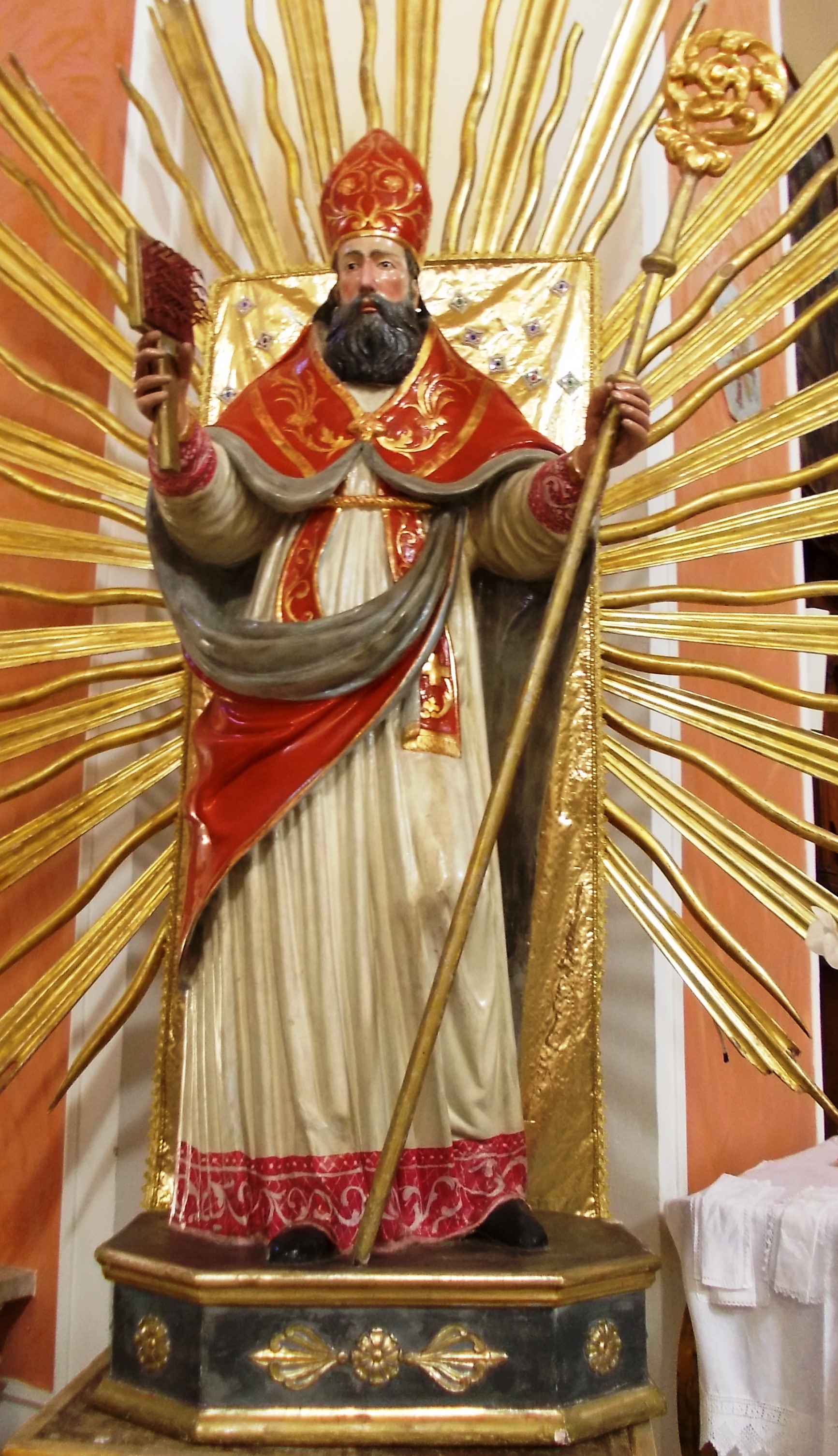
Wooden statue of St. Blaise (17th century), which is venerated on February 3.

Five chapels face the right nave, as on the left:

- First chapel: there is a stone baptismal font equipped with an embossed copper lid made by Armando Di Lauro of Cerreto in 1991. The Madonna del Soccorso altarpiece, from the countryside church of the same name, is made of carved wood and consists of two fluted columns with Corinthian order capitals. The columns support a wooden lintel carved with floral motifs and cherubs. Set inside the altarpiece is a painting depicting the Madonna holding the infant Jesus with one arm while with her right hand she is in the act of beating the devil, lying on the ground beside his pitchfork. Numerous cherubs attend the scene, two of whom hold the Madonna's crown while a child hides behind the Virgin's robe. On the side walls are two painted wooden panels depicting Hope and Faith.
- Second chapel: there stands a small temple made in 1954 to hold the statue of St. Rita. The temple's tempera decorations are by Cerreto-born painter Francesco Barile. To the left, within a niche, is the papier-mâché statue of St. Teresa. On the right is the Resurrection, a ceramic by Magda Kluska (2005).
- Third chapel: originally dedicated to Jesus Crucified, the statue of Christ the Redeemer, venerated on July 31 each year, was placed there in 1904. The statue was made thanks to a contribution of 10 liras from the Holy See and offerings from the faithful of Cerreto and emigrants to America. The tempera decorations are by painters Domenico and Luigi Biondi while the marbles are the work of Raffaele Giordano in the early 20th century.
- Fourth chapel: it was commissioned by the "tertiary nuns" or "house nuns," some forty unmarried women who in 1742 joined for the purpose of embellishing this chapel, which they dedicated to St. Lucy. The stucco antependium, colored and gilded, adorns a painting in which the saint is depicted holding a plate with her own eyes in her left hand. Within a niche is a wooden statue of the same saint made in 1886 at the devotion of Concetta di Meola. Also preserved in the chapel is a modestly sized painting depicting St. Apollonia, patroness of teeth.
- Fifth chapel: in the niche over the altar stands the wooden statue of St. Blaise, mentioned as early as 1697. The statue is the object of deep devotion on February 3 each year when portions of blessed bread are distributed and eaten immediately after anointing the throat with oil. During the anointing of the throat, it is traditional for the priest to recite the following words, "In the name of St. Blaise, bishop and martyr, I release you from the sore throat and all other evils." Under the vault is a canvas depicting Our Lady with St. Alessio Falconieri, painted in devotion of notary Nicola Mastrobuoni in 1730. On the left wall within a stucco frame is Ecce Homo, a painting from ancient Cerreto; on the right wall is the Crucifixion.

==== Chapel of Our Lady of Sorrows ====
The chapel, located to the right of those looking at the chancel, was originally dedicated to St. Blaise. In the 19th century it was dedicated to the Blessed Virgin of the Seven Sorrows and was equipped with a statue and a marble altar.

The chapel houses the shrine to Cerreto-born fallen soldiers from all wars, and numerous photos and letters that soldiers sent from the front are preserved there.

== See also ==
- Cerreto Sannita
- 1688 Sannio earthquake
- Roman Catholic Diocese of Cerreto Sannita-Telese-Sant'Agata de' Goti

== Bibliography ==
- VV., AA. (1991). Cerreto Sannita: Testimonianze d'arte tra Sette e Ottocento. Napoli: Edizioni Scientifiche Italiane.
- VV., AA. (2007). La Ceramica di Cerreto Sannita e San Lorenzello. E.C.S.C.S.L.M.
- VV., AA. (2010). Cerreto Sannita. Cerreto Sannita: Società Operaia di Cerreto Sannita.
- VV., AA. (2011). Poesie cerretesi di ieri, di oggi e di domani. Cerreto Sannita: Quaderni della Società Operaia di Cerreto Sannita.
- Franco, Domenico (1966). La pastorizia ed il commercio della lana nella antica e nuova Cerreto. Napoli: Samnium.
- Galasso, Elio (1967). Caratteri paleografici e diplomatici dell'atto privato a Capua e a Benevento prima del secolo XI in Il contributo dell'archidiocesi di Capua alla vita religiosa e culturale del Meridione. Roma: De Luca Ed.
- Ianacchino, Angelo Michele (1900). Storia di Telesia, sua diocesi e pastori. Benevento.
- Mazzacane, Vincenzo (1990). Memorie storiche di Cerreto Sannita. Napoli: Liguori. ISBN 88-207-1928-2.
- Pacichelli, Giovan Battista (1703). Il Regno di Napoli in prospettiva. Napoli: Mutio.
- Pescitelli, Renato (1977). Chiesa Telesina: luoghi di culto, di educazione e di assistenza nel XVI e XVII secolo. Benevento: Auxiliatrix.
- Pescitelli, Renato (2011). Cerreto Sacra: volume primo. Cerreto Sannita: TetaPrint.
- Pescitelli, Renato (2011). Cerreto Sacra: volume secondo. Cerreto Sannita: TetaPrint.
- Pescitelli, Renato (2011). Documenti di Storia Municipale di Cerreto: Regesto delle deliberazioni del Decurionato degli anni 1808-1813. Cerreto Sannita: TetaPrint.
- Pescitelli, Renato (1990). La Chiesa Collegiata di San Martino Vescovo in Cerreto Sannita. Don Bosco.
- Pro Loco Cerreto Sannita (2001). Una passeggiata nella storia. Cerreto Sannita: Tip. Modernissima.
- Rotondi, Nicola (1870). Memorie storiche di Cerreto Sannita. Cerreto Sannita: manoscritto inedito conservato nell'Archivio comunale.
