= Felice Leonardo =

Italian prelate

His Excellency, The Most Reverend Felice Leonardo
- Bishop of Diocese of Cerreto Sannita-Telese-Sant’Agata de’ Goti (emeritus)
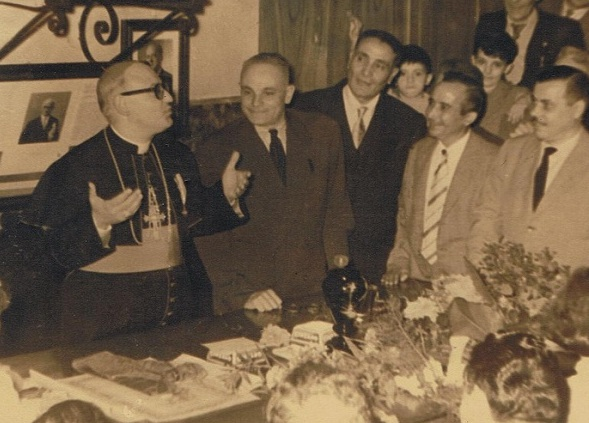
- Felice Leonardo in 1957
- Church: Roman Catholic Church
- See: Diocese of Cerreto Sannita-Telese-Sant’Agata de’ Goti
- In office: 1957–1991
- Predecessor: Salvatore Del Bene
- Successor: Mario Paciello

Orders
- Ordination: 24 July 1938
- Consecration: 29 September 1957 by Adeodato Giovanni Cardinal Piazza

Personal details
- Born: 9 March 1915 Pietramelara, Kingdom of Italy
- Died: 15 April 2015 (aged 100) Roccamonfina, Italy

Felice Leonardo (9 March 1915 – 15 April 2015) was an Italian prelate of Roman Catholic Church. At the age of 100, he was one of the oldest Roman Catholic bishops. Since the death of Cardinal Ersilio Tonini, he also was the oldest Roman Catholic bishop from Italy.

== Biography ==
Leonardo was born in Pietramelara, Italy in 1915. He was ordained a priest on 24 July 1938, appointed bishop on 22 July 1957 to the Telese o Cerreto Sannita Diocese, and consecrated on 29 September 1957.

On 21 March 1984, Leonardo was appointed to the Diocese of Sant'Agata de' Goti, then to the Roman Catholic Diocese of Cerreto Sannita-Telese-Sant’Agata de’ Goti when the diocese of Telese o Cerreto Sannita and the Diocese of Sant'Agata de' Goti united on 29 September 1986.

Leonardo retired as Bishop of Diocese of Cerreto Sannita-Telese-Sant’Agata de’ Goti on 20 July 1991.

== External links and additional sources ==
- Cheney, David M. "Diocese of Cerreto Sannita-Telese-Sant'Agata de' Goti". Catholic-Hierarchy.org. (Chronology of Bishops)^{self-published}
- Chow, Gabriel. "Diocese of Cerreto Sannita-Telese-Sant'Agata de' Goti". GCatholic.org. (Chronology of Bishops)^{self-published}
- Catholic-Hierarchy
