= Diocese of Cerreto Sannita-Telese-Sant'Agata de' Goti =

Roman Catholic diocese in Italy

Coordinates: 41°16′57″N 14°33′18″E

Diocese of Cerreto Sannita-Telese-Sant’Agata de' Goti Dioecesis Cerretana-Thelesina-Sanctae Agathae Gothorum

Catholic
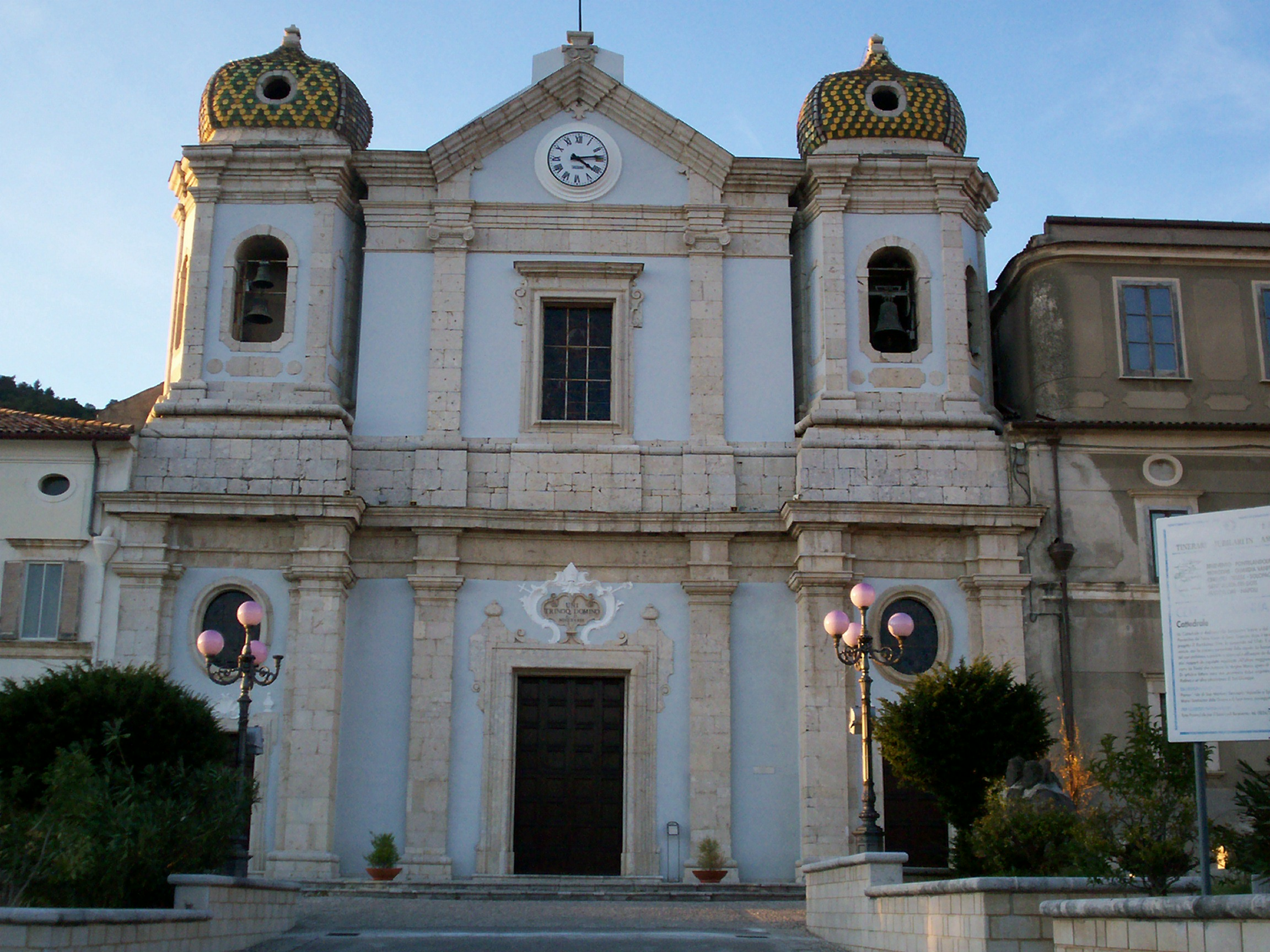
- Cathedral in Cerreto Sannita

Location
- Country: Italy
- Ecclesiastical province: Benevento

Statistics
- Area: 583 km^{2} (225 sq mi)
- Population: Total; Catholics: (as of 2021); 88,322; 86,289 (97.7%)
- Parishes: 60

Information
- Denomination: Catholic Church
- Rite: Roman Rite
- Established: 5th Century
- Cathedral: SS. Trinità e Beata Vergine Maria Madre della Chiesa (Cerreto Sannita)
- Co-cathedral: Santissima Trinità (Telese Terme); S. Maria Assunta (Sant’Agata de’ Goti)
- Secular priests: 53 (diocesan); 14 (Religious Orders); 2 Permanent Deacons

Current leadership
- Pope: Leo XIV
- Bishop: Giuseppe Mazzafaro
- Bishops emeritus: Michele De Rosa

Website
- www.diocesicerreto.it

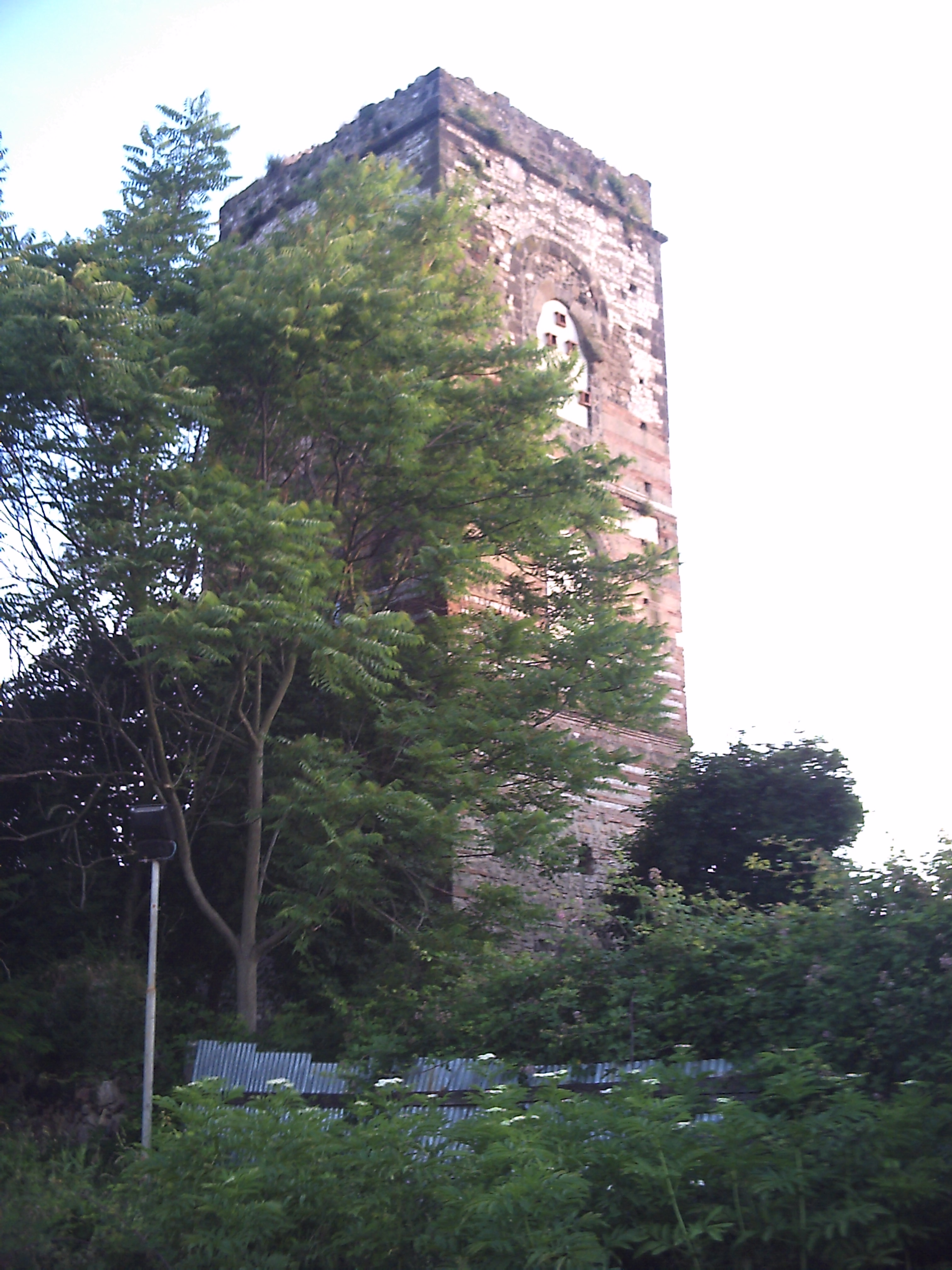
Deconsecrated cathedral ruins in Telese Terme

The Diocese of Cerreto Sannita-Telese-Sant'Agata de' Goti (Latin: Dioecesis Cerretana-Thelesina-Sanctae Agathae Gothorum) is a Latin diocese of the Catholic Church in Campania, Italy, has existed since 1986, when the Diocese of Sant'Agata de' Goti was suppressed, and its territory and Catholic population united to the Diocese of Telese-Cerreto Sannita. The diocese is a suffragan of the Archdiocese of Benevento.

The cathedral of the diocese, the Cattedrale di SS. Trinità e Beata Vergine Maria Madre della Chiesa, dedicated to the Holy Trinity and, in a late-20th century addition, to Mary Mother of the Church, is located in Cerreto Sannita.

== History ==
The first bishop of Telese mentioned is Florentius (465). Having fallen into decay, the town was rebuilt in the ninth century. From the tenth century it was subject to the Archbishop of Benevento.

In 1612, since Telese was almost completely depopulated, Bishop Gian Francesco Leoni transferred the episcopal residence to Cerrito (which came to be called Cerreto vecchio). That Cerreto was completely destroyed in the great earthquake of 5 June 1688, with a death toll at around 4,000 in the city and county. The survivors relocated to a new site, also called Cerreto or Cerreto Sannita. Bishop de Belli reported that the cathedral and the episcopal palace of Cerreto vecchio were destroyed, that the cathedral Chapter lost eight of its members, the collegiate church of S. Martino lost its archpriest and two canons, and the larger part of the priests were killed. Thirty-eight nuns were killed, and fifteen Conventual Franciscans.

Among its bishops were:

- Angelo Massarelli (1567), secretary of the Council of Trent, of which he wrote the acts and a diary;
- Vincenzo Lupoli (1792), a jurist.

=== Cathedrals and important churches ===
The former Cathedral of the Holy Cross in Cerreto antiquo is in a ruined state.

The diocese now has its episcopal seat in the Cathedral of the Holy Trinity and S. Leonardo in Cerreto Sannita. The cathedral was administered by a corporation called the Chapter, which was composed of four dignities (the Archdeacon, the Primicerius major, the Primicerius minor, and the Archpriest) and ten canons. Due to the insalubrious state of Telese, the canons were non-residential. In 1675, after the entire ecclesiastical establishment had moved to Cerreto, there were four dignities and twelve canons. In 1747, there were four dignities and eleven canons.

There is also a Co-Cathedral, the Concattedrale di S. Maria Assunta, in Sant’Agata de’ Goti.

There is also a minor basilica, the Basilica-Santuario di S. Maria Assunta e S. Filippo Neri, in Guardia Sanframondi, which had been rebuilt on earlier foundations and consecrated in 1465, and then again rebuilt after the great earthquake of 1688. The Oratorians of S. Philip Neri had been granted the use of the church by Pope Alexander VII in 1655.

=== After the French ===
Following the extinction of the Napoleonic Kingdom of Italy, the Congress of Vienna authorized the restoration of the Papal States and the Kingdom of Naples. Since the French occupation had seen the abolition of many Church institutions in the Kingdom, as well as the confiscation of much Church property and resources, it was imperative that Pope Pius VII and King Ferdinand IV reach agreement on restoration and restitution. Ferdinand demanded the suppression of fifty dioceses.

A concordat was finally signed on 16 February 1818, and ratified by Pius VII on 25 February 1818. Ferdinand issued the concordat as a law on 21 March 1818. On 27 June 1818, Pius VII issued the bull De Ulteriore, in which the ecclesiastical province of Benevento was restored, including it suffragans, among them the united dioceses of Cerreto e Telese. The decision was also made to suppress permanently the diocese of Alife, and to incorporate its territory into the diocese of Cerreto e Telese.

On 15 January 1820, after numerous protests, Pope Pius VII issued the bull "Adorandi Servatoris", by which he revoked and annulled the provisions of the bull "De Ulteriore" so far as they commanded the suppression of the diocese of Alife. There was, however, an additional provision: that one and the same bishop would be the bishop of Alife and the bishop of Telese at the same time. aeque personaliter. He was to be called the bishop of "Alife e Telese".

On 6 July 1852, in the bull "Compertum Nobis", Pope Pius IX made the decision to reverse the judgment of Pope Pius VII and restore the independence of the diocese of Alife, thereby separating its territory again from the power of the bishop of Cerreto e Telese.

=== Diocesan Reorganization ===
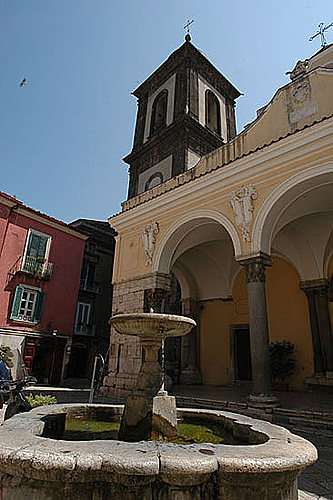
Co-cathedral in Sant'Agata de' Goti

Following the Second Vatican Council, and in accordance with the norms laid out in the council's decree, Christus Dominus chapter 40, Pope Paul VI ordered a reorganization of the ecclesiastical provinces in southern Italy, beginning with consultations among the members of the Congregation of Bishops in the Vatican Curia, the Italian Bishops Conference, and the various dioceses concerned.

On 18 February 1984, the Vatican and the Italian State signed a new and revised concordat. Based on the revisions, a set of Normae was issued on 15 November 1984, which was accompanied in the next year, on 3 June 1985, by enabling legislation. According to the agreement, the practice of having one bishop govern two separate dioceses at the same time, aeque personaliter, was abolished. The Vatican continued consultations which had begun under Pope John XXIII for the merging of small dioceses, especially those with personnel and financial problems, into one combined diocese.

On 30 September 1986, Pope John Paul II ordered that the dioceses of Diocese of Telese-Cerreto Sannita and S. Agatha Gothorum be merged into one diocese with one bishop, with the Latin title Dioecesis Cerretana-Thelesina-Sanctae Agathae Gothorum. The seat of the diocese was to be in Cerreto, whose cathedral was to serve as the cathedral of the merged diocese. The cathedral in S. Agatha Gothorum was to have the honorary title of "co-cathedral"; the Chapter was to be a Capitulum Concathedralis. There was to be only one diocesan Tribunal, in Molfetta, and likewise one seminary, one College of Consultors, and one Priests' Council. The territory of the new diocese was to include the territory of the suppressed diocese. The new diocese was a suffragan of the archdiocese of Benevento.

== Bishops of Telese ==
Diocese erected: 5th Century

...

- Florentius (attested 465)
- Agnellus (attested 487)

[Mennas]
...

- Tommaso (attested 1080)

...

- Petrus (attested 1178– after 1189)

...

- Lucianus (1214?–?)

...

- R(- - -)

...

- Rao (28 March 1240 – death 1286)
- Salernus (16 July 1286 – 1296?)
- Giacomo (1296? – death 1325)
- Giovanni Arisio (21 May 1326 – death 1328)
- Tommaso (7 November 1328 – death 1340)
- Tommaso (6 November 1340 – death 1345)
- Matteo Guiliand, O.F.M. (15 July 1345 – death 1348)
- Domenico, O.F.M. (10 November 1348 – 1353)
- Giacomo da Cerreto (1353 – 1372)
- Giacomo (14 July 1372 – 1398)
- Giovanni Casalialbulo, O.F.M. (21 May 1386 – 1393) Avignon Obedience
- Nicolas di Bettaro (1393 – ? ) Avignon Obedience
- Clemente da Napoli, O.E.S.A. (1399 – ? ) Roman Obedience
- Marcuzio Angelo Brancia (20 Jan 1413 – 1453 Died)
- Fernandus Gimal (Gurre) (1454 – 1458)
- Meolo de Mascabruni (1459 – 1464)
- Matteo Giudici (8 Oct 1464 – 1483)
- Troilo Agnesi (17 Dec 1483 – 1487)
- Pietro Palagario, O.F.M. (12 Feb 1487 – 1505)
- Andrea Riccio (1505 – 1515)
- Biagio Caropipe (1515 – 1524)
- Giovanni Gregorio Peroschi (8 August 1524 – 1525 Resigned)
- Mauro de Pretis (1525 – 1533)
- Sebastiano de Bonfilii (14 Feb 1533 – 1540 Resigned)
- Alberico Giaquinto (1540 – 1548)
- Giovanni Beraldo (1548 – 1557)
- Angelo Massarelli (15 Dec 1557 – 17 July 1566 Died)
- Cherubino Lavosio, O.S.A. (19 August 1566 – 23 April 1577 Died)
- Annibale Cotugno (15 Oct 1578 – 1584 Died)
- Juan Esteban de Urbieta, O.P. (17 Dec 1584 – 1587 Resigned)
- Cesare Bellocchio (12 Oct 1587 – 15 Nov 1595)
- Eugenio Savino (27 March 1596 – Sep 1604)
- Placido Fava, O.S.B. (17 Nov 1604 – 19 Nov 1605)
- Eugenio Cattaneo, B. (13 Feb 1606 – 1608)
- Giovanni Francesco Leoni (15 Dec 1608 – see below)

== Bishops of Telese o Cerreto Sannita ==
Latin name: Thelesina seu Cerretana

- Giovanni Francesco Leoni (see above 15 Dec 1608 – 14 April 1613 Died)
- Sigismondo Gambacorta, C.R.S.A. (15 July 1613 – Oct 1636 Died)
- Pietro Paolo de' Rustici, O.S.B. (16 March 1637 – 14 Dec 1643)
- Pietro Marioni (18 April 1644 – 1659 Resigned)
- Pietro Francesco Moia, C.R.S. (1 Sep 1659 – 1674)
- Domenico Cito, O.P. (1675 – 1683)
- Giovanni Battista de Belli (1684 – 1693)
- Biagio Gambaro (22 Dec 1693 – Oct 1721 Died)
- Francesco Baccari (14 Jan 1722 – 13 May 1736 Died)
- Antonio Falangola (9 July 1736 – 29 May 1747)
- Filippo Gentile (20 Nov 1747 – 25 June 1771 Died)
- Filiberto Pascali (Pascale) (23 Sep 1771 – 20 Feb 1788 Died)
- Vincenzo Lupoli (27 Feb 1792 – 1 Jan 1800 Died)

Sede vacante (1800 – 1818)

== Bishops of Telese o Cerreto e Alife ==
- Raffaele Longobardi (21 Dec 1818 Confirmed – 1823)
- Giovanni Battista de Martino (1824 – 1826)
- Carlo Puoti 1826 – 1848)
- Gennaro di Giacomo (22 Dec 1848 – July 1852 Resigned)

== Bishops of Telese o Cerreto ==
- Luigi Sodo (27 June 1853 Confirmed – 30 July 1895 Died)
- Angelo Michele Jannachino (29 Nov 1895 – 12 Jan 1918 Resigned)
- Giuseppe Signore (20 June 1918 – 1 Dec 1928 Resigned)
- Salvatore Del Bene (17 Dec 1928 – 6 April 1957 Died)
- Felice Leonardo (22 July 1957 – 20 July 1991 Retired)

== Bishops of Cerreto Sannita-Telese-Sant’Agata de’ Goti ==
United 30 September 1986 with Diocese of Sant’Agata de’ Goti
Latin Name: Cerretana-Thelesina-Sanctae Agathae Gothorum

- Mario Paciello (20 July 1991 – 1997)
- Michele De Rosa (23 May 1998 – 24 June 2016 Retired)
- Domenico Battaglia (24 June 2016 – 2020)
- Giuseppe Mazzafaro (2021 – present)

== See also ==
- Roman Catholic Diocese of Alife-Caiazzo
- Roman Catholic Diocese of Sant'Agata de' Goti
- List of Catholic dioceses in Italy

== Bibliography ==
=== Episcopal lists ===
- Eubel, Conradus, ed. (1913). Hierarchia catholica (in Latin). Vol. I (second ed.). Münster: Libreria Regensbergiana.
- Eubel, Conradus, ed. (1914). Hierarchia catholica (in Latin). Vol. II (second ed.). Münster: Libreria Regensbergiana.
- Eubel, Conradus; Gulik, Guilelmus (1923). Hierarchia catholica (in Latin). Vol. III (second ed.). Münster: Libreria Regensbergiana.
- Gams, Pius Bonifatius (1873). Series episcoporum Ecclesiae catholicae: quotquot innotuerunt a beato Petro apostolo (in Latin). Ratisbon: Typis et Sumptibus Georgii Josephi Manz. p. 930.
- Gauchat, Patritius (Patrice) (1935). Hierarchia catholica (in Latin). Vol. IV (1592-1667). Münster: Libraria Regensbergiana.
- Ritzler, Remigius; Sefrin, Pirminus (1952). Hierarchia catholica medii et recentis aevi (in Latin). Vol. V (1667-1730). Patavii: Messagero di S. Antonio.
- Ritzler, Remigius; Sefrin, Pirminus (1958). Hierarchia catholica medii et recentis aevi (in Latin). Vol. VI (1730-1799). Patavii: Messagero di S. Antonio.
- Ritzler, Remigius; Sefrin, Pirminus (1968). Hierarchia Catholica medii et recentioris aevi (in Latin). Vol. VII (1800–1846). Monasterii: Libreria Regensburgiana.
- Remigius Ritzler; Pirminus Sefrin (1978). Hierarchia catholica Medii et recentioris aevi (in Latin). Vol. VIII (1846–1903). Il Messaggero di S. Antonio.
- Pięta, Zenon (2002). Hierarchia catholica medii et recentioris aevi (in Latin). Vol. IX (1903–1922). Padua: Messagero di San Antonio. ISBN 978-88-250-1000-8.

=== Studies ===
- Cappelletti, Giuseppe (1864). Le chiese d'Italia: dalla loro origine sino ai nostri giorni (in Italian). Vol. Tomo decimonono (19). Venice: G. Antonelli. pp. 341–349.
- D'Avino, Vincenzo (1848). Cenni storici sulle chiese arcivescovili, vescovili, e prelatizie (nulluis) del Regno delle Due Sicilie (in Italian). Napoli: Ranucci. pp. 663–664. [article by: Canon Giovanni Rossi]
- Kehr, Paulus Fridolin (1962). Italia pontificia. Regesta pontificum Romanorum. Vol. IX: Samnia – Apulia – Lucania. (in Latin). Berlin: Weidmann. (in Latin). pp. 117–119.
- Rossi, Giovanni (1827). Catalogo de'vescovi di Telese. (in Italian). Napoli: Stamperia della Società tipografica, 1827
- Ughelli, Ferdinando; Coleti, NIccolo (1721). Italia sacra sive De episcopis Italiæ, et insularum adjacentium (in Latin). Vol. Tomus septimus (7). Venice: apud Sebastianum Coleti. pp. 367–374.

=== External links ===
- GCatholic
