= Mauro de Pretis =

Italian Roman Catholic prelate

Most Reverend Mauro de Pretis
- Bishop of Telese o Cerreto Sannita
- Church: Catholic Church
- Diocese: Diocese of Telese o Cerreto Sannita
- In office: 1525–1533
- Predecessor: Giovanni Gregorio Peroschi
- Successor: Sebastiano de Bonfilii

Personal details
- Died: 1533 Italy

Mauro de Pretis (died 1533) was a Roman Catholic prelate who served as Bishop of Telese o Cerreto Sannita (1525–1533).

On 6 October 1525, Mauro de Pretis was appointed during the papacy of Pope Clement VII as Bishop of Telese o Cerreto Sannita. He served as Bishop of Telese o Cerreto Sannita until his death in 1533.

== External links and additional sources ==
- Cheney, David M. "Diocese of Cerreto Sannita-Telese-Sant'Agata de' Goti". Catholic-Hierarchy.org. (Chronology of Bishops) ^{[self-published]}
- Chow, Gabriel. "Diocese of Cerreto Sannita-Telese-Sant'Agata de' Goti". GCatholic.org. (Chronology of Bishops) ^{[self-published]}

Catholic Church titles
Preceded by Giovanni Gregorio Peroschi	Bishop of Telese o Cerreto Sannita; 1525–1533	Succeeded by Sebastiano de Bonfilii
