= Cutugno =

Cutugno (pronounced [kuˈtuɲɲo]) is an Italian surname from eastern Sicily. Notable people with the surname include:

- Lorenzo Cutugno (1947–1978), Italian policeman and murder victim
- Toto Cutugno (1943–2023), Italian singer-songwriter, musician and television presenter

== See also ==
- Cotugno
- Cotogni
