= Cathedral of Sant'Agata de'Goti =

Cathedral in Sant'Agata de'Goti, Italy

Coordinates: 41.0917°N 14.5044°E

- Cattedrale dell'Assunta di Sant'Agata de' Goti
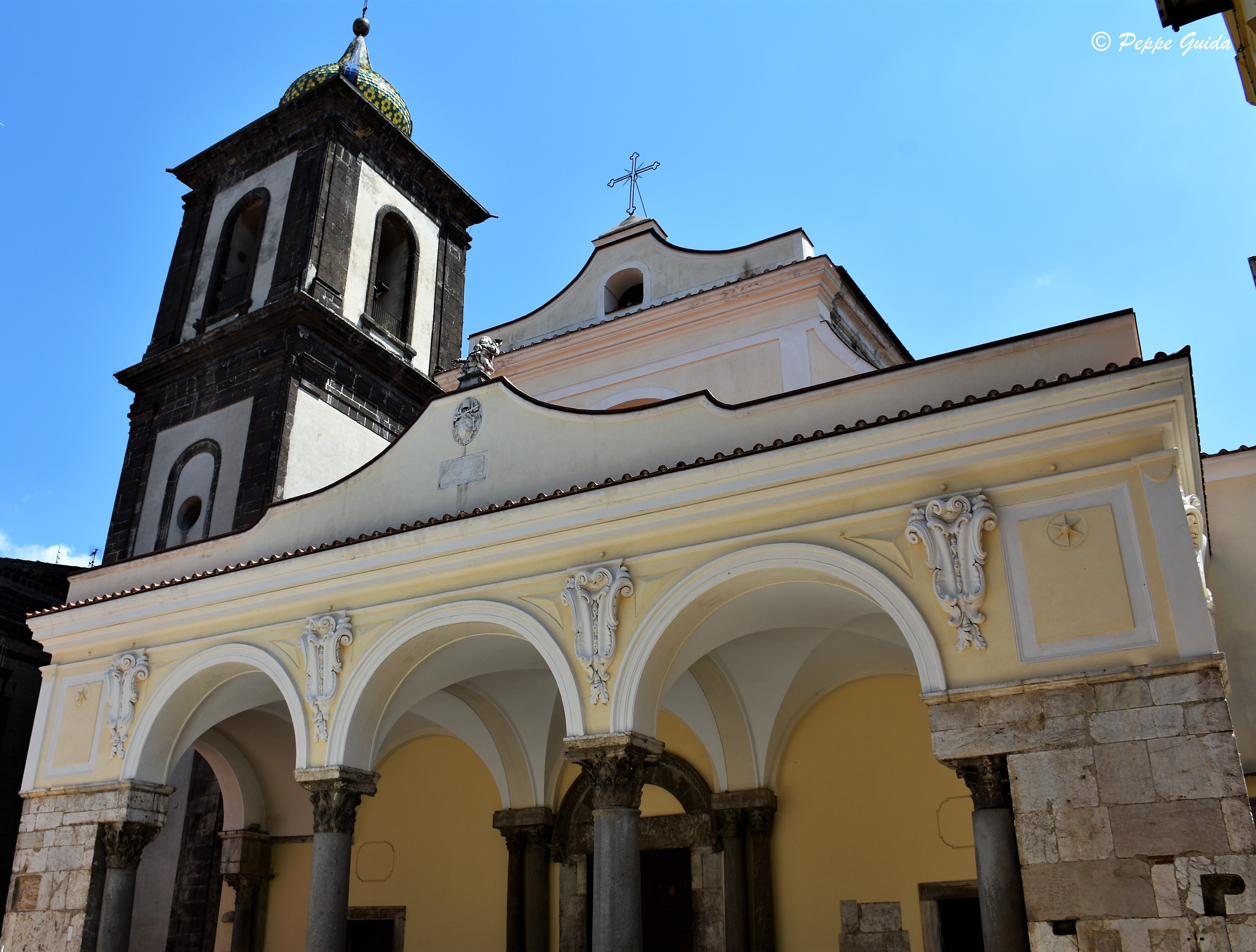
- Façade of the cathedral
- Cathedral of Sant'Agata de'Goti
- Location: Sant'Agata de' Goti, Campania
- Country: Italy
- Denomination: Roman Catholic

History
- Founded: 970
- Consecrated: 970

Architecture
- Style: Baroque
- Years built: 970 (first church); 13th century (second church); 1688 (current church)

Administration
- Diocese: Diocese of Cerreto Sannita-Telese-Sant'Agata de' Goti

Clergy
- Priest: Antonio Abbatiello

The Cathedral of Sant'Agata de'Goti, also known as the Cathedral of the Assumption, is a Roman Catholic cathedral located in Sant'Agata de' Goti, Benevento, Italy. It serves as the main church of the comune and one of the co-cathedrals of the Diocese of Cerreto Sannita-Telese-Sant'Agata de' Goti, along with that of Cerreto Sannita. The church was founded in 970, reconstructed in the 13th century, and then restored multiple times following the 1688 Sannio earthquake. The cathedral is a National Monument of Italy.

== Architecture ==
The exterior consists of a three-bay portico supported by twelve columns. The main Romanesque portal, similar to that of the Church of San Menna, is flanked on either side by two pairs of columns with Corinthian capitals. Baroque stucco work was added to it in the 17th century. To the left of the cathedral's façade stands the bell tower, three storeys tall and topped by a small dome covered with yellow and green majolica tiles. The interior has a Latin cross plan with three naves, a transept, a dome and a choir. The side chapels house works of art framed by Baroque stucco and feature polychrome marble altars. The ceiling of the central nave consists of painted and gilded wooden panels, a 19th-century work, whilst the high altar, set back from its original position, is made of inlaid polychrome marble. Beneath the transept lies the Romanesque crypt, where the numerous vaults rest on added columns, whilst traces of frescoes are visible on the walls.
