= Annibale Cotugno =

Italian Roman Catholic prelate

Most Reverend Annibale Cotugno
- Bishop of Telese o Cerreto Sannita
- Church: Catholic Church
- Diocese: Diocese of Telese o Cerreto Sannita
- In office: 1578–1584
- Predecessor: Cherubino Lavosio
- Successor: Juan Esteban de Urbieta

Orders
- Consecration: 14 Dec 1578 (Bishop) by Bernardino de Figueroa

Personal details
- Born: Naples
- Died: 1584 Italy

Annibale Cotugno (or Cataneo, Latin: Annibal Cotuneus, died 1584) was a Roman Catholic prelate who served as Bishop of Telese o Cerreto Sannita (1578–1584).

== Biography ==
Annibale was born in Naples to the noble family Cotugno or, less probably, to the noble family Cataneo. He served as Vicar of the diocese of Naples up to 1580. On 15 October 1578, Annibale was appointed during the papacy of Pope Gregory XIII as Bishop of Telese o Cerreto Sannita. Therefore, on Sunday 14 December 1578 he was consecrated bishop in Naples by the archbishop of Brindisi Bernardino de Figueroa.

He served as Bishop of Telese o Cerreto Sannita until his death in 1584. We know that he resided in Cerreto Sannita where he transferred the relics from Telese. He sought to implement the decrees of the Council of Trent within his diocese. Through his testament, he bequeathed a portion of his estate to the Capuchin friars, enabling them to construct the Sanctuary of Our Lady of Graces in Cerreto.

Catholic Church titles
| Preceded by Cherubino Lavosio | Bishop of Telese o Cerreto Sannita; 1578–1584 | Succeeded by Juan Esteban de Urbieta |
