= Telese Terme =

- Comune
- Comune di Telese Terme
- Location within Italy Location within Campania
- Coordinates: 41°13′N 14°32′E
- Country: Italy
- Region: Campania
- Province: Benevento (BN)

Government
  - Mayor: Pasquale Carofano

Area
  - Total: 9 km^{2} (3.5 sq mi)
- Elevation: 55 m (180 ft)

Population (2018-01-01)
  - Total: 5,740
  - Density: 640/km^{2} (1,700/sq mi)
- Time zone: UTC+1 (CET)
  - Summer (DST): UTC+2 (CEST)
- Postal code: 82037
- Dialing code: 0824
- Website: Official website

Telese Terme, called simply Telese until 1991, is a city, comune (municipality) and former episcopal seat in the Province of Benevento, in the Campania region of southern Italy. It is located in the valley of the Calore, well known for its sulfuric hot springs.

== Etymology ==
Telesia is an old word for the gem Sapphire.

== History ==
Telese was an ancient Samnite (Italic) city, known as T(h)elesia. Hannibal captured the city in 217 BCE; later, the victorious Roman general Scipio Africanus founded a Roman colony there.

In 460, a Diocese of Telese / Thelesina (Latin adjective) was established.

Having fallen into decay after the Gothic War, it was conquered by the Longobards, becoming part of the Lombard Duchy of Benevento as the seat of a gastaldry (district).

Saracens destroyed the city in 847 and 860, and again in the 11th century, during the war between King Roger II of Sicily and the Norman counts of the southern Italian mainland.

A new Telesia was built; however, it was again pulverized in 1349, this time by an earthquake.

Its former cathedral cattedrale Santa Croce, dedicated to the Holy Cross, now in ruins, was decommissioned after the bishops transferred their see to nearby Cerreto Sannita, yet the see retained the alternative title Diocese of Telese as well, even after a further merger into the Diocese of Cerreto Sannita–Telese–Sant’Agata de’ Goti.

In 1883, after the Unification of Italy, thermal baths were built, hence the current full name Telese Terme since 1991. Telese became an independent commune in 1934.

== Main sights ==
It possesses remains of walls in opus reticulatum, of a total length of over a mile; two inscriptions of the Republican period record the erection of towers. The remains of baths (Thermae Sabinianae) and of an amphitheatre still exist; the city was supplied with water by an aqueduct. There are sulphur springs in the vicinity, which may have supplied the baths.

== See also ==
- List of Catholic dioceses in Italy
