= Guardiolo =

Italian controlled wine origin region in Benevento

Guardiolo is a group of wines grown and produced in the Italian comune of Guardia Sanframondi, San Lorenzo Maggiore, San Lupo, and Castelvenere in the Province of Benevento. This is a hilly farming region with small streams. There are both white and red varieties of Guardiolo. It has been awarded Denominazione di Origine Controllata (DOC) status.
