= Monastery of the Poor Clares (Cerreto Sannita) =

Monastery in Cerreto Sannita, Italy

- Ex monastero delle Clarisse
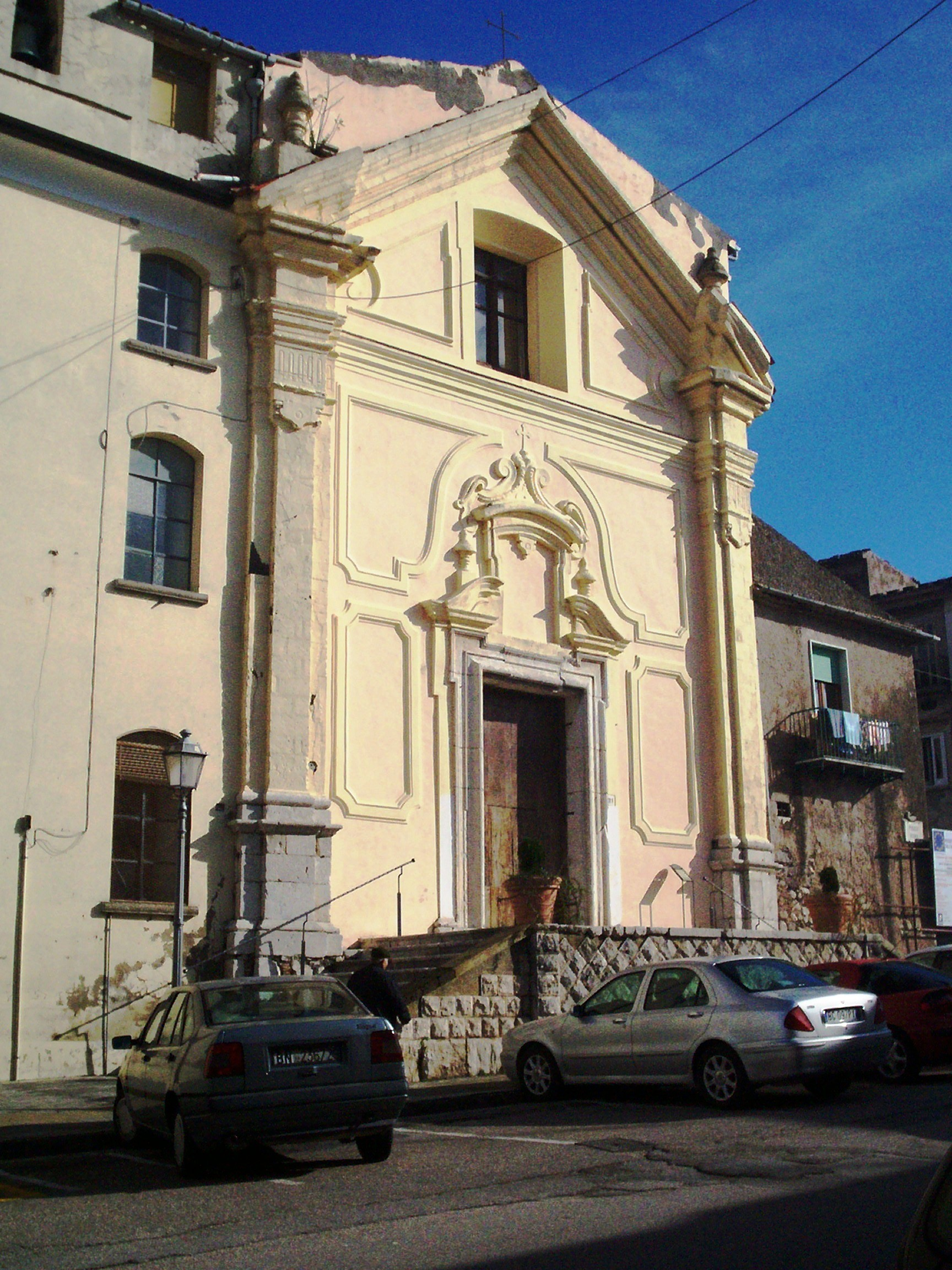
- Exterior of the church

- 41.287064°N 14.563639°E
- Location: Cerreto Sannita, Campania, Italy
- Denomination: Catholic

Architecture
- Style: Baroque
- Groundbreaking: 1688
- Completed: 1705 (church); 1729 (monastery)

Administration
- Diocese: Roman Catholic Diocese of Cerreto Sannita-Telese-Sant'Agata de' Goti

The former Monastery of the Poor Clares of Cerreto Sannita is an ancient place of worship founded in 1369 by Francesca Sanframondi, collateral relative and chamberlain to Queen Joanna I of Naples as well as a relative of Giovanni III Sanframondi, count of Cerreto Sannita. Rebuilt after the June 5, 1688 earthquake, the monastery housed the order of Urbanist Poor Clares from the 14th century to the 20th century when it became the property of the Sisters of Charity of Our Lady of Good and Perpetual Help, who established a boarding school, kindergarten, language high school, school and teacher training institute there, naming the complex after Pope Leo XIII. The church attached to the monastery is a splendid example of Baroque architecture. Remained intact over the centuries, it preserves in the pronaos an 18th-century ceramic floor.

The minutes of the various trials that took place over the years between the bishops and the nuns, preserved in the archives of the Episcopal Curia, provide a wealth of information about the life of the Poor Clares within the monastery and their relations with the outside world.

== History ==
=== The foundation ===
The Monastery of the Urbanist Poor Clares of Cerreto Sannita was founded by Francesca Sanframondi, widow of Pietro de Cadenet, collateral relative and chamberlain to Queen Joanna I of Naples. According to Nicola Rotondi Francesca was the daughter of Giovanni III, count of Cerreto from 1285 to 1319, while according to Dante Marocco she was sister of Giovanni and daughter of Leonardo Sanframondi.

On January 3, 1369 the apostolic letter of foundation of the monastery was issued, sent to the bishop of the time Monsignor Giacomo da Cerreto and which Rotondi translates as follows:

To the things, by which the increase of Divine Worship, and of Sacred Religion is procured, we willingly assent, and add the steadfastness of the apostolic firmament. The request submitted to Us on behalf of the beloved daughter in Christ, noble woman Francesca di Sanframondi, widow, of the diocese of Telese included, that she longing to change by felicitous commerce the earthly into the heavenly things, and the transitory into the eternal, of the goods bestowed upon her by God, for the salvation of her souls and those of her parents, and passed ones, she built and erected in the Castle of Cerreto of the said Diocese in a place from that, and honored, permitting the Bishop of the said place, a Monastery of the Order of St. Clare with the Church, bell tower, bell, and other needed facilities, in which ten Nuns of the Order of the said Saint are to live, to serve themselves in perpetual habit of the Religion the Lord of virtues in honor, and under the name of the Blessed Virgin Mary Mother of Christ, and has endowed it with so much, that from the fruits of the said endowment the said number of Nuns may be sustained with ease. In the name, therefore, of the said Francesca we were humbly entreated to deign by Apostolic benignity to give to such construction, and edification the Apostolic confirmation. We, therefore, who of the permission certainly have no news, commenting very much upon the aforesaid pious work of the said Woman in the Lord, bowing to such supplications, we enjoin, and command by Apostolic writing to your fraternity, of which in such, and other things have in the Lord special trust, that if you find permission, we will procure you to approve, and confirm by our authority such a construction, edification, and endowment, and other things to come from there, always with due regard for the right of the parish church, and of any other church.

— Nicola Rotondi

The monastery, however, became fully functional only a few months later since when the foundress Francesca Sanframondi drew up her will on February 10, 1369, in the presence of Queen Joanna I, she arranged to be buried temporarily in the chapel of St. John the Apostle in the church of St. Anthony in Cerreto, in the meantime that the building would be completed.

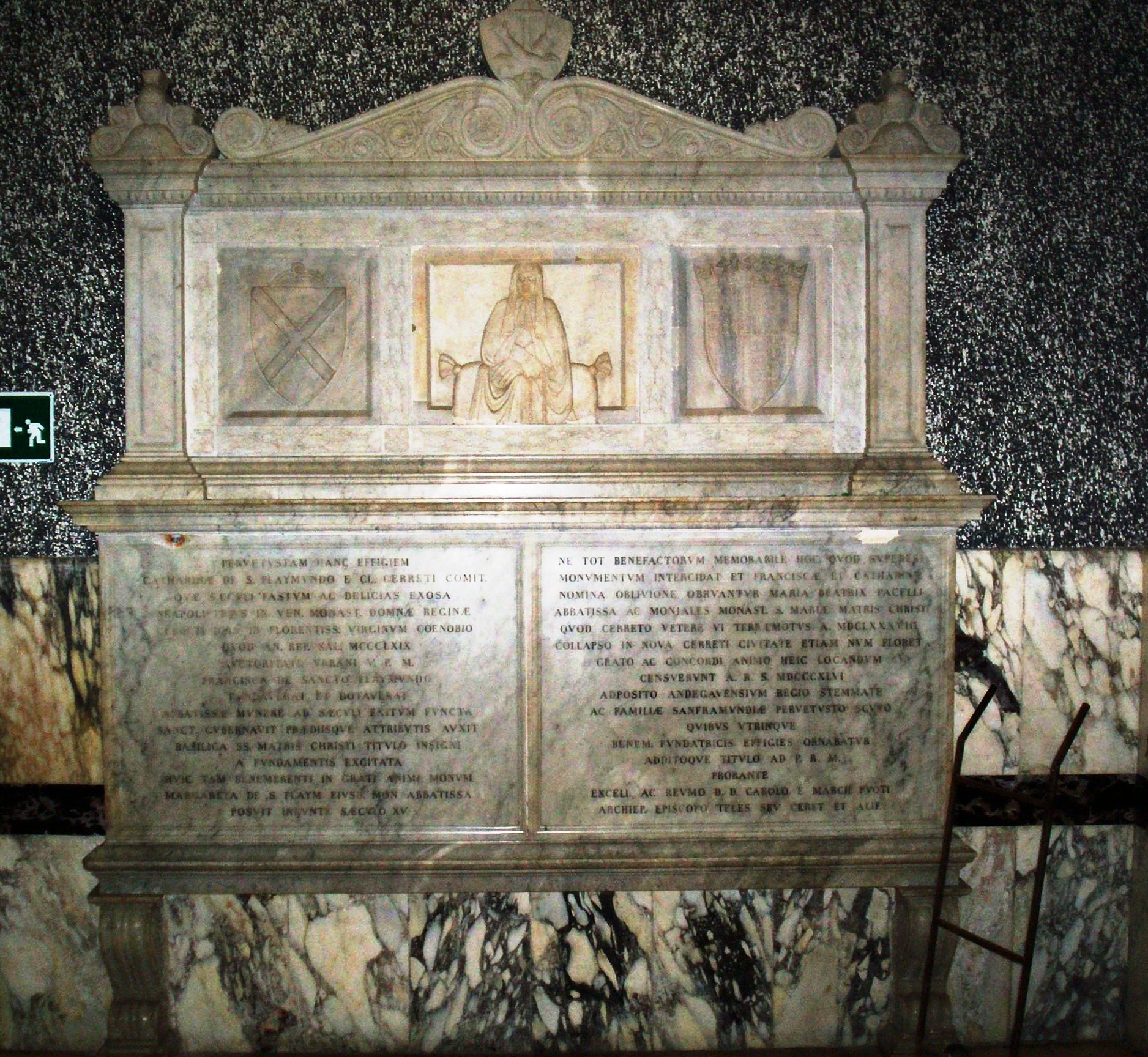
The memorial to the first abbess Caterina Sanframondi located in the atrium of the building

Moreover, it is not certain whether Sanframondi spent the last years of her life in the monastery. In fact, Rotondi in this regard says that "Nor does it appear from any monument that at an old and advanced age she had closed herself there to pass safely, and far from the turbulence of the Court, the life that remained to her." Upon her death, Francesca was buried behind the high altar of the Church of the Poor Clares in a tomb where the Sanframondo coat of arms, consisting of a saltire in gold on a blue field, and a stone statue depicting her, still visible in a pillar of the present cloister in the 19th century, stood out.

The first abbess of the monastery was Caterina Sanframondi, who, according to Rotondi, was the daughter of Pietro and cousin of the foundress Francesca, while for Morocco she was the daughter of Giovanni and therefore Francesca's niece. She was appointed abbess by a brief dated Jan. 8, 1369, from Cardinal Albanese by which she was ordered to move from the monastery of Santa Maria di Donna Regina in Naples to that of Cerreto along with sisters Giovanna and Agnese Sanframondi, Rita and Caterina di Cetano, Chiarella da Pietraroja and Francesca da Cerreto.

Caterina, during the 30 years she was abbess, enriched the monastery with many houses and lands scattered in the municipalities of Cerreto, San Lorenzello, Massa and Limata, and had the exemption of the same from the payment of tithes. In 1397 she obtained permission from Pope Benedict XII to leave the cloister for health reasons and to move to the house of Nicolò, who is referred to in the brief as her brother, thus suggesting, according to Pescitelli, a Rotondi genealogy.

Upon Caterina's death, the second abbess Margherita Sanframondi had a marble tomb made, which is preserved today in the atrium of the former monastery. It was found in 1842 in a room of the building as being of abbess Maria Beatrice Pacelli. In 1843 Rotondi interpreted its inscription located above the bas-relief depicting Sanframondi, which reads:

+ MRIS XP basiliae e q dit X De S.FRAYMUNDO
(Mater Christi Basiliae -regiae- aedes, quas ditavit Catharina de S. Fraymundo)

=== The monastery and church in old Cerreto ===
According to the historian Pacichelli, the monastery, facing south, occupied a wing of the Sanframondo castle along with the Conventual Fathers of St. Anthony, and was located precisely opposite them, so much so that in a trial preserved in the Archives of the Episcopal Curia of Cerreto Sannita it is written that: "above once the Sisters could be seen, who in their rooms were busy with their work." Overlooking the complex was a square on which the respective churches entitled to St. Mary Mother of God and St. Anthony of Padua also stood.

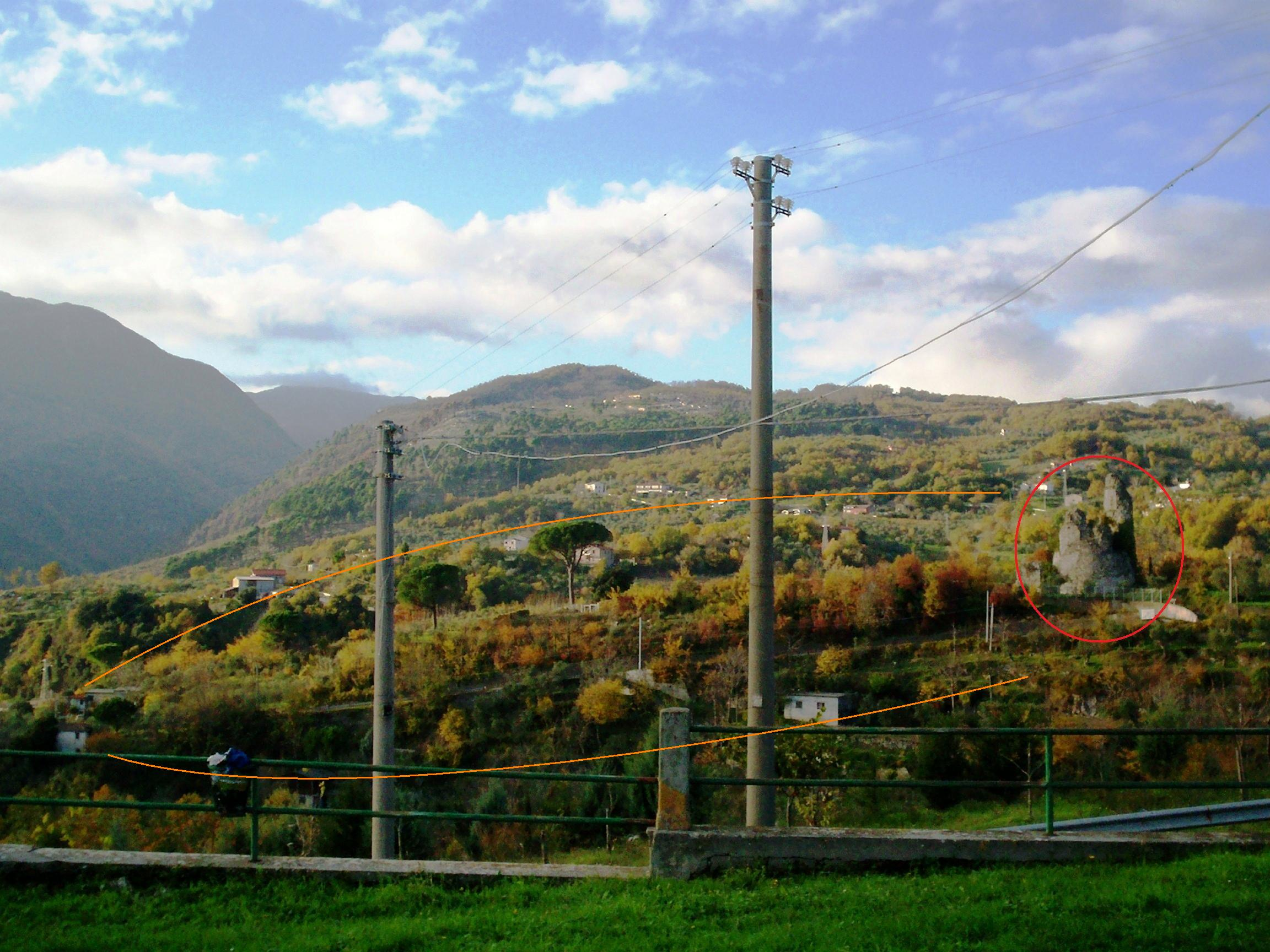
The hill where ancient Cerreto stood, destroyed by the earthquake of June 5, 1688. On the right are the ruins of the keep near which the monastery stood.

Originally there were two doors of access, one to the church and another to the monastery to which a new door was added in 1631 that led into the parlor where the nuns through a grating spoke with relatives. Before then the access to the parlor was located in the church but Monsignor Gambacorta wanted to close this entrance to prevent people from passing through it.

The main door gave access to a cloister from which a stairway arose that ended in a corridor and which in 1596 turned out to be barred by a door that led into a large dormitory, consisting of nineteen cells, lit by a large window that by order of Monsignor Savino was partly walled up to prevent the nuns from being able to see from the outside. In addition to this dormitory there was another room, above it. According to Pescitelli this was how the building must have been from its foundation to the end of the 16th century, without major structural changes.

At the beginning of the 17th century, there were two dormitories, one facing west with seventeen cells and another at the south with seven small rooms while another consisting of five rooms was being completed. In 1670 Monsignor Marioni counted six dormitories: the old one with eight rooms; the one under the tower with six cells; a third one above the refectory with eleven rooms; a fourth one overlooking the monastery oven with eight small rooms; a fifth one that overhung the square in front of the complex and had four rooms; and a sixth one located above the tower with two cells, next to which was a room used as a prison. In 1686 Bishop Giovanni Battista de Bellis found two more dormitories, the first with nine rooms and the second with five that jutted out over the castle moat. Finally De Bellis saw that the tower dormitory had been enriched with another room, making a total of fifty-five cells. There were also an oven, a kitchen, a wash-house, a refectory, a pantry, a granary, a cellar and a chicken coop where each nun, according to an ancient custom, had her own chickens.

The church, located to the right of the monastery, was quite large. According to Rotondi it was dedicated to the Holy Spirit, but Pescitelli refutes this thesis because there is no trace of that designation in historical documents and opts instead for the dedication to St. Mary Mother of God, like the present place of worship.

The high altar was surmounted by a canvas depicting the descent into the Upper Room of the Holy Spirit. Near it, on the wall facing the monastery, was a grate from which the Poor Clares received communion, and behind the high altar was the sacristy, which was very cramped and where the tomb of the foundress Francesca Sanframondi was located. Preceding that altar and to the left of it was a confessional and another altar that was torn down by order of Monsignor Gambacorta because it was too close to the high altar. Next was the altar of the Conception of the Raho and that of the Virgin's Nativity of the De Blasio. Next to the latter was another confessional and the door, bricked up in 1631, leading to the parlor where there were three grates and the wheel of outcasts through which the nuns exchanged artifacts with the outside. At the opposite wall were a chapel of the De Niro entitled All Saints. This was followed by the altar of the Crucifix and the altar of the Assumption.

=== The nuns and the earthquake of June 5, 1688 ===
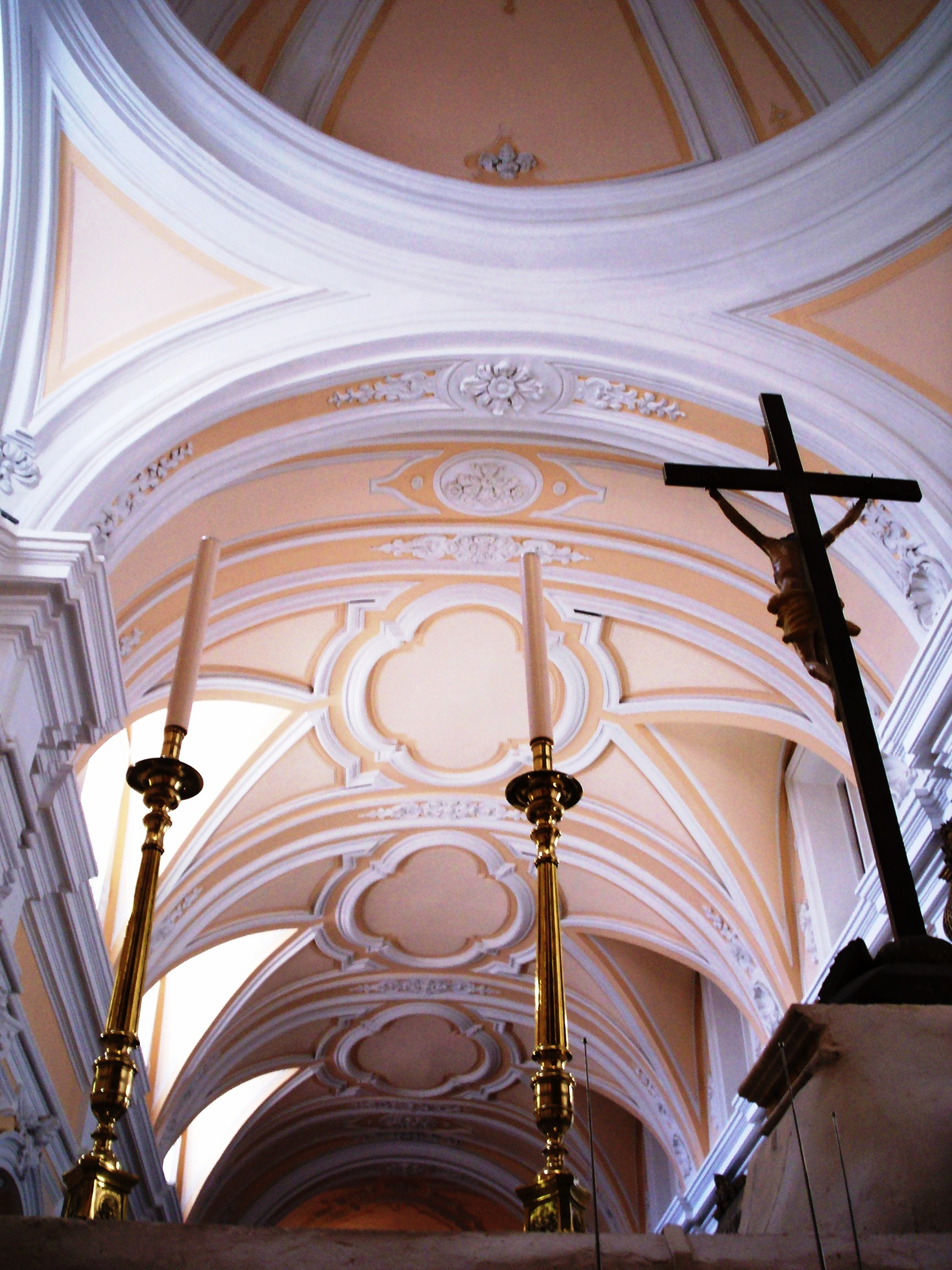
Glimpse of the vault of the Church of the Poor Clares as seen from the high altar

The earthquake of June 5, 1688, which razed the old medieval settlement to the ground, caught the nuns while they were intent on reciting vespers in the choir of the church, specially brought in by the abbess after the first premonitory tremor according to the account of one of the twenty-four surviving nuns in a memoir collected by Mazzacane:

In the year of our Lord 1688 at June 5 at twenty o'clock on the Saturday of Pentecost [... ] at the time that we found ourselves singing solemn vespers, in intoning the first psalm of vespers was the first tremor, which we saw all of us dead, however Mother Abbess Sister Giuditta Mazzacane gave place of silence, and we continued with the vespers, in the Benedicamus domino the earthquake was so terrible, that we were all buried alive in the said Choir, of which forty nuns remained alive with the Abbess Sr. Giuditta Mazzacane still alive [. ..]

— Vincenzo Mazzacane

Mazzacane adds:

Many [nuns] were found kneeling, turned to Heaven, almost asking for Mercy, and one of them, held in the concept of a saint by her companions, after twelve days, while they were preparing to arrange her in the funeral bed, she covered by herself her breast which had become somewhat denuded, it was thought to be a miracle, and the bishop and a great number of people flocked.

— Vincenzo Mazzacane

Forty Poor Clare nuns perished under the rubble while twenty-four, including the abbess, were saved even though some of them, dug up after a few days, remembered nothing of what had happened. Of the nuns, seven out of eleven died. The chaplain and confessor also perished while the surviving nuns, in the confusion and fright caused by the incident, began to wander in the surrounding countryside, a territory completely unknown to them since the nuns had entered seclusion at a young age. De Bellis promptly provided for them by gathering them at the farmhouse of Baron Pietro Petronzi (near what is now vico aia) where they stayed under the surveillance of relatives and the bishop himself, who moved there with the entire bishop's court.

The surviving abbess, on whom, according to Pescitelli, fell the responsibility for the drama by not having allowed, after the premonitory tremor, the nuns to take refuge in a safer place, begged Monsignor De Bellis because "as they found themselves withdrawn in the courtyard of Pietro Petronzi under a miserable hut because of the tremor" to transfer the survivors to a more suitable place to accommodate them. De Bellis then got in touch with Count Marzio Carafa and with the assent of the Congregation of Bishops it was agreed to transfer the nuns to the hospital monastery in Maddaloni. Thus in July 1688 the nuns were transported, two by two, to their new quarters, escorted by the bishop himself, family members and the feudal lord's guards. On reaching Maddaloni they were received by Count Marzio Carafa, his brother Marino and the viceroy of Naples, Francesco Bonavides.

Nine nuns died in Maddaloni: abbess Sister Giuditta Mazzacane, Sister Teresa Petronzi, Sister Anna Mazzacane, Sister Maria Brigida Magnati, Sister Agnese and Giovanna Ciaburro, Sister Amalia and Grazia Nardella, Sister Lucrezia Mattei and lay sister Camilla Meola. On the other hand, nine nuns and two lay sisters were welcomed "with solemn feasts of Neapolitan music."

=== The monastery and church in present-day Cerreto ===
The building of the monastery and church in present-day Cerreto, designed by Giovanni Battista Manni at the behest of Count Marzio Carafa, began immediately after the earthquake and was started by masons Andrea Pagano and Orazio and Giuseppe Paduano. Construction soon stopped due to lack of funds, and work was resumed only in August 1692 thanks to the sale of a capital of 2,000 ducats by the Prince of Colubrano.

Soon after completing the first dormitory, corresponding to the wing facing Piazza Roma, on December 8, 1696 the nuns returned to Cerreto from Maddaloni to their new monastery even though it still lacked any comforts. They temporarily built small kitchens in front of the cell entrances while, having collected the sum of 135 ducats, a corridor and a terrace toward the courtyard were built, a corridor plastered in 1705 by master Antonio Calise, in the same year in which he did the stucco work in the church. Sister Geltrude Corrado also spent from her own pocket 25 ducats for the construction of the oven.

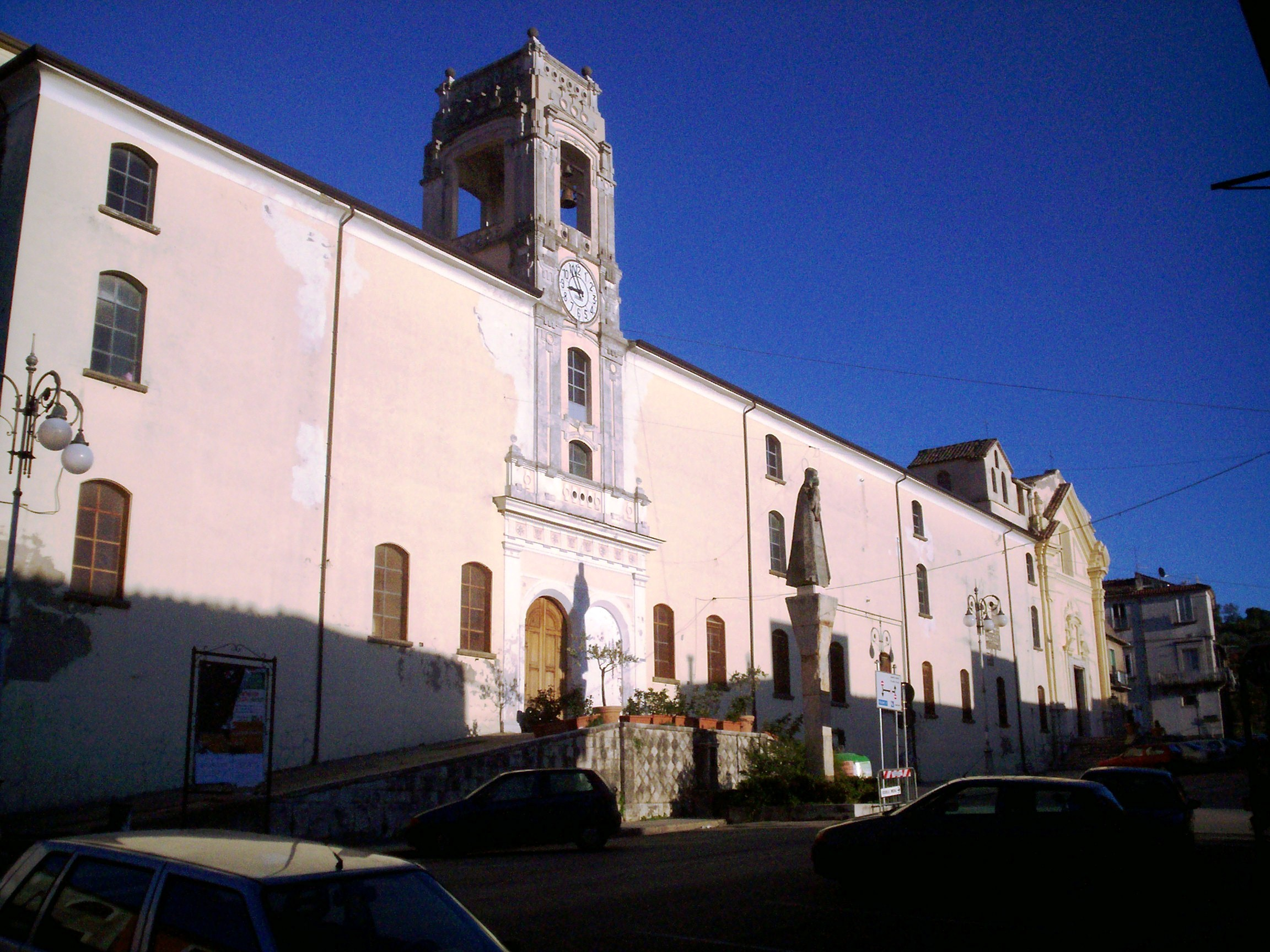
Facade to Piazza Roma of the former monastery of the Poor Clares, now Istituto Leone XIII, after renovations in the 20th century

However, the space was insufficient to accommodate all the nuns and more than one slept in the cells, contravening the dictates established by the Council of Trent. Thus it happened that young women who were about to become nuns at that time first had to build their own cell, and the first nun to whom this fate befell her was Maria Celeste Bruno in 1713. But such behavior led to irregularities that Msgr. Pascale put an end to years later.

In 1711 the dormitory facing north and the chaplain's house were completed, by master masons Pietro Fazzino and Ascanio and Nicolò Paduano, while in 1717, after a collection of money that took place among the nuns the masters Angelo Paduano del fu Nicolò, Pietro Fazzino and Ascanio Paduano fu Giuseppe agreed to finish the interrupted work. But despite these expansions the space was still insufficient since in 1728 there were fifty-eight nuns while the cells were only twenty-eight. Faced with this situation Monsignor Francesco Baccari wrote in the same year to the Congregation of Bishops denouncing the difficult situation in which the nuns found themselves and adding that "to overcome the uneasiness in undressing" he ordered the beds to be separated with a canvas partition.

Despite these difficulties, the monastery was in time brought to completion so that in 1729 the abbess of that time, Margherita Ciaburri, asked the Universitas for the uncultivated land behind the complex, which, immediately donated to them, was refurbished, enclosed by high walls and used as a garden where the burial ground was also built.

In 1861 the Royal Decree of February 17 declared that all houses of monastic orders of both sexes located in the Neapolitan provinces were to be closed, and as a result the Poor Clare Monastery of Cerreto along with that of the Capuchins was included among the institutes to be closed. The nuns, however, took advantage of the provision of Article 8 of the same law, which provided for a delay in its implementation if a special request was submitted to the Dicastery for Ecclesiastical Affairs within the three-month deadline. Contextually, local politicians worked to ensure that at least this ancient sacred building would be spared. The subject was dealt with by several town councils and in various letters and pleas for intervention addressed to deputies, the prefect of Benevento and the province.

However, the Royal Decree of October 27, 1866 completed the implementation of the previous one whereby the monastery was incorporated into the cult fund. Faced with this situation, Mayor Armando Ungaro requested and obtained the transfer of the building to the municipality to use as schools. In 1911, the complex was sold for eight thousand liras to the Reverends Amedeo Franco, Matteo Gagliardi, Carluigi Di Lella, Francesco Ciaburri, Bartolomeo Di Paola, Domenico Amato, Giuseppe Di Crosta and Giuseppe Sanzari on the condition that the monastery would be used for charity, education and assistance. Finally, on March 26, 1930, the Congregation of the Sisters of Charity of Our Lady of Good and Perpetual Help purchased the building, which it still owns today, and used it as a boarding school, kindergarten, language high school, school and teacher training institute.

== The lives of the Poor Clare nuns and their relationship with the society ==
Until the end of the 16th century, there are few documents that provide details about the life of the Poor Clares within their monastery and their relations with the outside world. In fact, after the first abbesses Caterina and Margherita Sanframondi and Rita d'Acquavia, there is no other news until the advent of Msgr. Savino, who in 1596 denounced the non-existence of a real archive in the bishop's curia due to the continuous wandering of the Telesine bishops, in search of a stable seat, found in Cerreto at the beginning of the 17th century. All that is known is that by a brief of July 21, 1465, Pope Paul II excommunicated anyone who held "tithes, revenues, proceeds, annual pensions, estates, houses, gardens, fields, vineyards, meadows, pastures, forests, woods, coins [...]" owned by the monastery. Pescitelli supposes that this deed arose as a result of a theft that occurred due to the rebellion of Giovanni Sanframondi, count of Cerreto Sannita, against the Aragonese and ended with his defeat and the advent of the new feudal lords of the Carafa house. Confirming this thesis is the fact that in 1525 the abbess Sister Chiara Cusano asked permission from Pope Clement VII to be able to sell a ground room and some chalices to subsidize the community's most urgent needs.

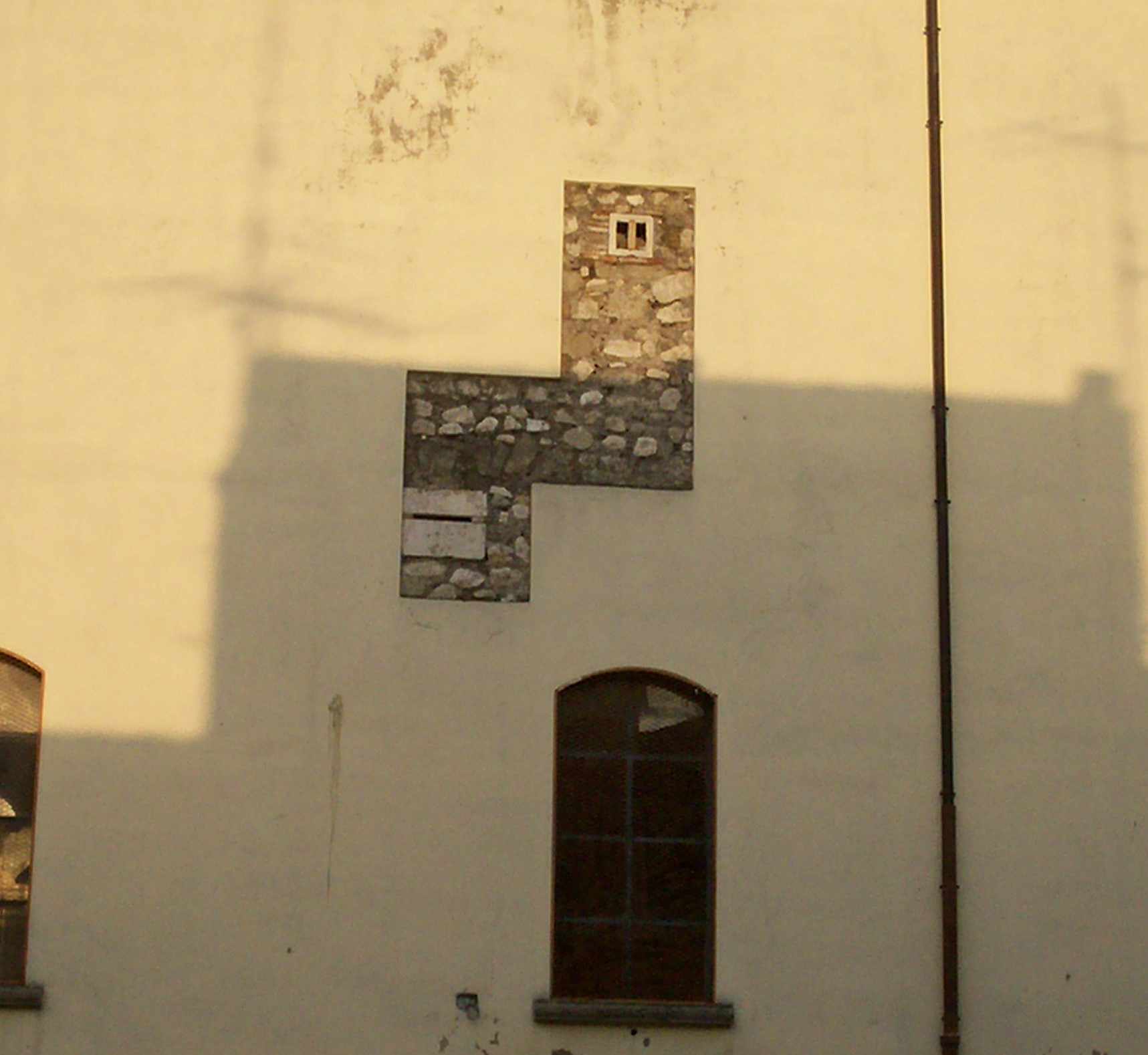
Detail of the facade of the former monastery where the doors of the cells of the Poor Clares can be seen

In the meantime, the monastery continued to grow, so much so that in a letter dated January 31, 1589, the Holy Congregation of Bishops set the maximum number of Poor Clares at twenty, decreeing further that the dowry of the nuns was to be paid in cash to be then invested in goods that would bear fruit each year. As an exception to these rules, the bishop could commute this payment, then consisting of a sum with a value between 100 and 200 ducats, into real estate. The dowries were then forfeited by the monastery to pay common expenses.

The daily life of the nuns was held between mass, choir and work devoted to embroidery, weaving and making sweets. Each was allotted a certain amount of bread that had to suffice for a week, half a bottle of wine a day and a full meal on Tuesdays, Thursdays and Sundays. If they became ill, each of them had to take care of herself and spend of her own to provide for her needs.

In addition to the abbess in the monastery there were also two nuns, appointed every January 1 by the abbess to advise and assist her in her exercise, the teachers of the students, the lay sisters who served the choristers, and finally the vicar who took care of the baking and kept the keys to the granary and cellar. The students, on the other hand, although living in the monastery, did not wear the habit and were enclosed in it from an early age with the hope that they would become nuns. They were either endowed before entering the cloister or were supported by family members or one or more nuns, a case that occurred very often over the centuries.

From 1607 to 1610 the monastery of Cerreto hosted Sister Giulia Di Marco, held by the people in the odor of sanctity. Together with her confessor Fr. Aniello Arciero and a lawyer, Giuseppe de Vicariis, she founded a secret congregation. According to her own account, "the intimate union she had with God" allowed her to go on long fasts that made Bishop Gentile of Caserta suspicious. Having informed the Holy Office of this, the latter ordered Arciero not to leave the Papal States and Di Marco to move to the monastery of St. Anthony in Naples, where, however, she continued to be venerated by the people while De Vicariis procured writings for her that Sister Julia said were dictated by God. In 1607 she was transferred to Cerreto where, according to Rotondi, she did not finish deceiving the Poor Clares "[...] nor did she ever stop sowing discord." Discovered by the other nuns stealing food during one of her long fasts, she was transferred to Nocera to be later tried along with the other congregants on charges of carnal transactions.

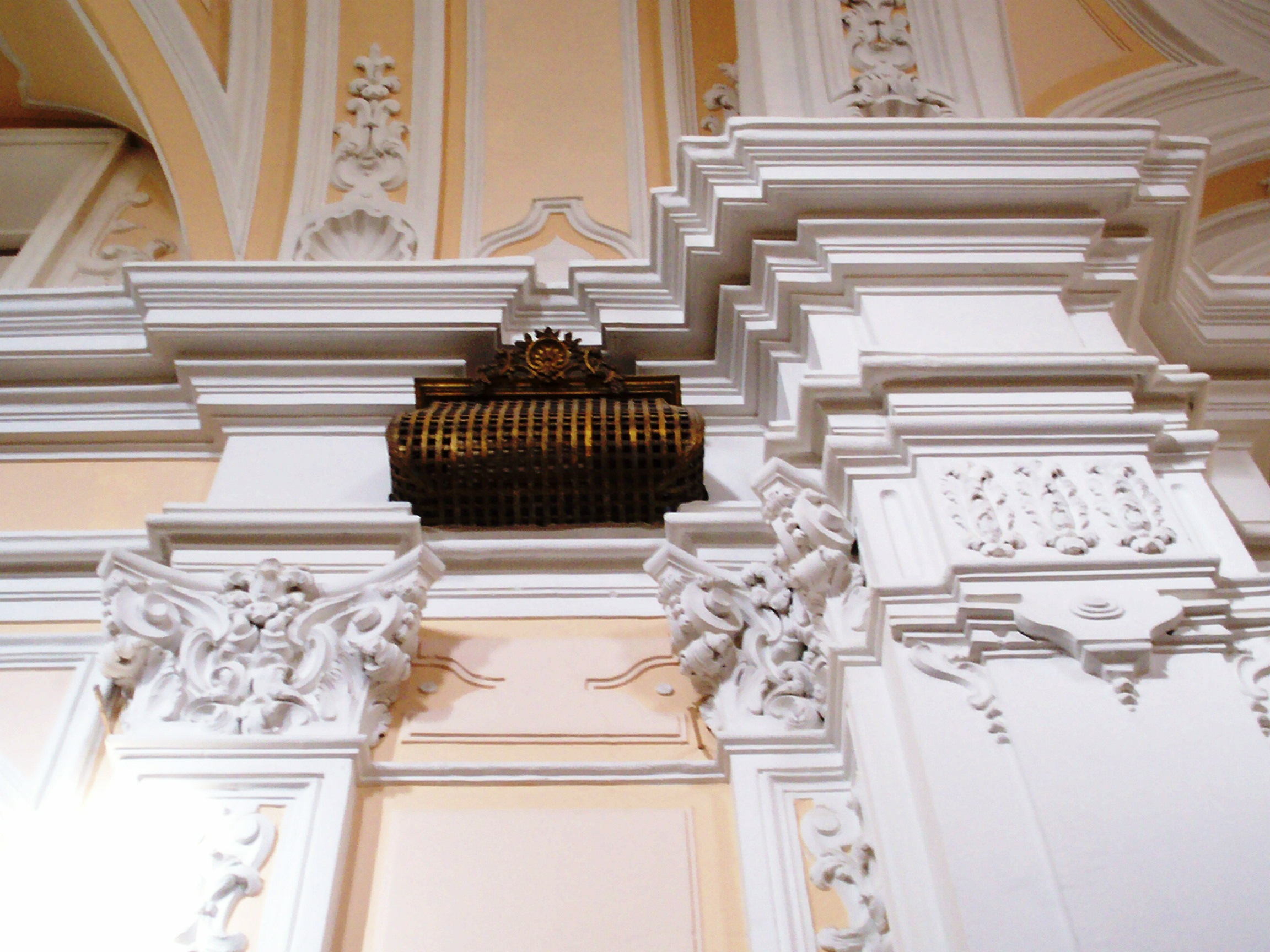
Detail of one of the gratings located in the monastery church, from which the Poor Clares listened to Mass

Bishop Sigismondo Gambacorta in 1614 dictated new measures to the Poor Clares and took the keys of the monastery away from the Universitas, putting an end to the strange custom that arose following the death of Bishop Cotugno in 1583. An elected member of the Universitas, Giovan Tommaso Magnati, appealed to the Holy Congregation of Bishops against this measure, saying that it was an ancient right and denouncing that a copy of the keys had been given to Don Pasquale de Liso, a priest of dubious customs. He also accused the bishop of allowing the Conventual fathers to open windows from the bell tower of their church and of not having closed the windows of the priests' houses located in the vicinity of the complex and from which the nuns could be spied on. The Sacred Congregation quickly responded by agreeing with the bishop, declaring Magnati's petition impertinent and suggesting that Msgr. Gambacorta not even give the keys to the canon of the Collegiate Church of San Martino De Laurentis, because he was 26 years old, but to someone older.

A very serious episode occurred on December 3, 1634 when Baroness Altabella Petronzi, widow of the notary Annibale Dalio, in order to prevent two of her nieces (Giovanna and Margherita Ciaburro aged 14 and 15, orphans) from marrying against their will according to the dictate of their paternal uncle Pietro, pushed them into seclusion in cahoots with the abbess and some nuns. Bishop Gambacorta, reporting to the Holy Congregation, described the event by narrating that while the chaplain Don Geronimo d'Avantino stood where the lumber was being kept, Petronzi and her two nieces entered. At the chaplain's invitation to leave they did not leave and while the baroness restrained the elderly chaplain, shouting to the onlookers over the priest's shouting "[...] tell don Geronimo to drop dead, go to the choir and there you will see, tell him to drop dead," the young women passed the door of the enclosure and entered the kitchen exclaiming to the bystanders "blessed are you who have enthusiasm" and sat down happily. A trial followed that ended with the excommunication of Altabella Petronzi, the abbess Giovanna Dalio, the janitor Altabella Giameo and the two protagonists Giovanna and Margherita Ciaburro. These, however, pleaded with the bishop to withdraw the excommunication by paying a bond of one hundred ducats while waiting for the Apostolic response ordering that the excommunication be withdrawn from all of them, that the two young women be let out of the monastery and that the bishop's discretion be exercised against the abbess or not. On December 13, 1635, the bishop's vicar went to the monastery together with some canons where in the presence of all the nuns, addressing the Ciaburros he said:

I have come here on purpose to get you out of the monastery, Giovanna and Margarita Ciaburro, as you have sent word [...] last night and already the doors of the cloister will open, and hand you over to Madonna Aurelia Ciaburro, your aunt, so that you may go to your home.

The two sisters replied:

Sir, we do not want to leave the monastery in any way but we are resolved to die in the cloister, and although last night we said we wanted to leave, Sister Giovanna Dalio, our aunt, suggested and persuaded us to say in this way, but our will is to make ourselves nuns and die in this monastery.

Having opened the door to the cloister, the vicar again invited the young women to come out but at their umpteenth refusal he declared that the bishop would come and settle the matter. And on January 20 Msgr. Gambacorta took himself to the monastery and asked the girls if they had had second thoughts, they replied in the negative and the bishop arranged to accept their wishes by giving them the habit and changing their names, putting an end to this affair.

By the middle of the 17th century, there appeared to be numerous petitions from citizens from all parts of the diocese asking for their daughters to enter the monastery. In 1655 the Holy Congregation of Bishops urged Msgr. Marioni to the resolution of this issue after receiving a letter, signed by the Poor Clare nuns, asking to increase the maximum number of nuns by three. But on questioning the nuns they denied having written that letter, drafted instead by a parent who had been denied the entry of one of his daughters into the monastery. The Universitas of Cerreto had also taken an interest in the matter, also protesting the excessive increase in the dowry, from 200 ducats in 1596 to 400 in 1609, becoming so high that the people of Cerreto could not allow their daughters to become nuns. The only exception was Sister Francesca Raetano, daughter of the late Vincenzo, who brought as much as 1,000 ducats in dowry.

In 1638 Msgr. Pietro Paolo de Rustici, in his visit to the monastery, reprimanded nuns Antonia Salomone and Girolama Corrado who contended for the direction of the choir, even going so far as to use insulting words. But since such behavior was commented on, albeit in a whisper, by three other nuns, the bishop sentenced all of them to six months in prison without having any relationship with the other Poor Clares; only one nun was allowed to bring them morning and evening food. Their little experience of the world and life often led these nuns to have a stubbornness and obstinacy typical of children. Examples of this behavior are two incidents that occurred in 1672 and 1676.

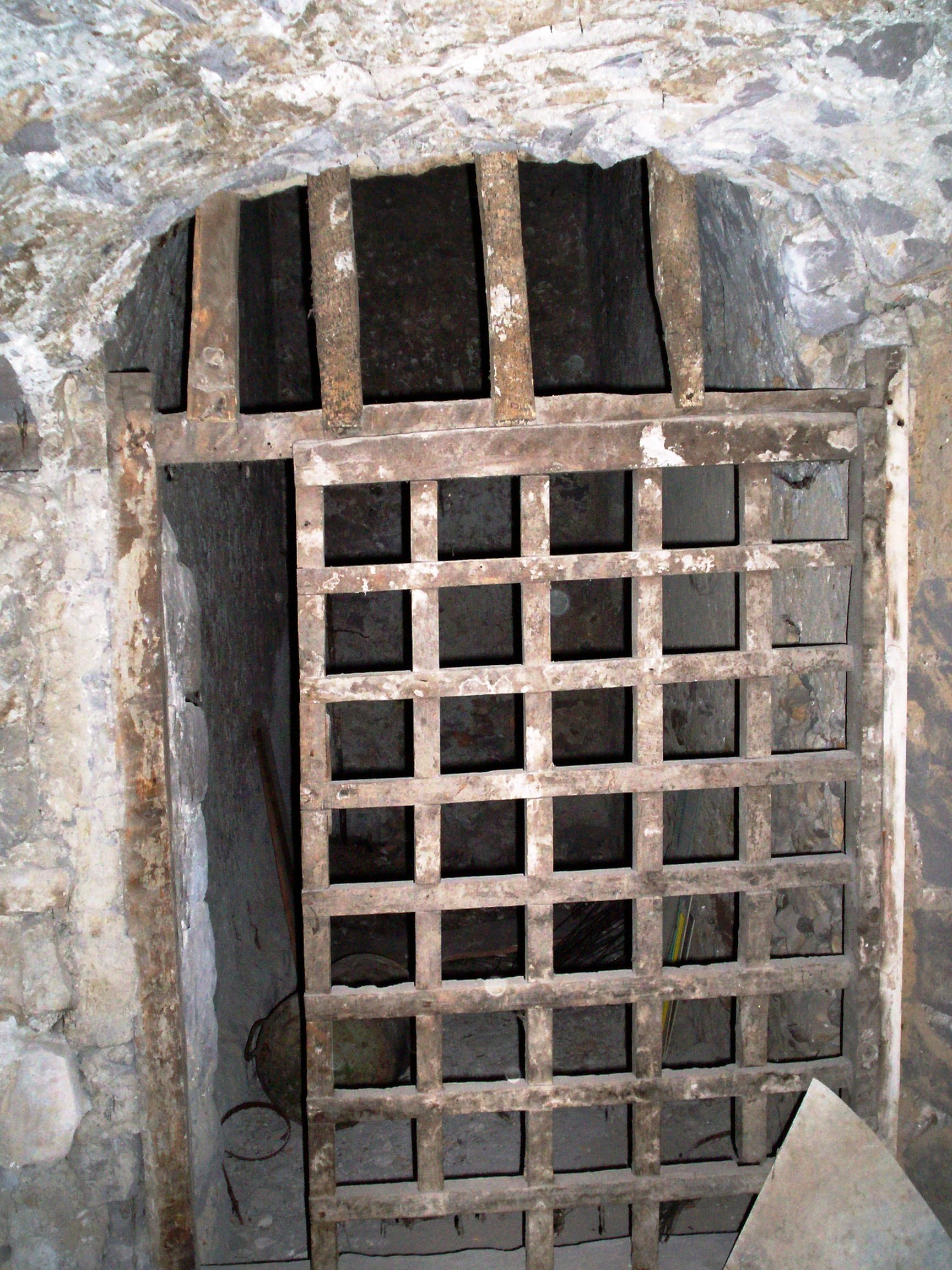
Detail of the "prison" cell where nuns were imprisoned in case of disobedience

The first occurred after Sister Rita Corrado's death when her cell, by right of seniority, was supposed to fall to Sister Evangelista Gizzi but it was taken over by the deceased's nieces, Rita and Geltrude, who gave it to Sister Romana Mastracchio. To no avail were the abbess's prayers and Gizzi's threats to make Mastracchio desist despite having been excommunicated by the bishop. Only after the other nuns had isolated her did Mastracchio leave the chamber, fearing isolation more than excommunication.

In 1676, however, it happened that Msgr. Cito appointed Don Pietro Varrone, canon of the Cathedral, as chaplain, revoking the mandate of Don Mario Cappella, indicated as chaplain by the abbess. When Varro went to the monastery he found the nuns intimidating him to leave because they wanted no one else but Don Mario Cappella, adding that anyone who came in his place would be killed. After a few days Varro returned to the nuns but the nuns came to the grate and insulted him "with bad and disgraceful words," and the priest ran away "not being able to stand any more of said bad words." The bishop's vicar then brought himself to the Poor Clares to bring the nuns to obedience but they replied to the vicar "No, Sir, we do not want to obey, we do not want to obey," shouting such words several times and adding others against the bishop, defined in the minutes of the trial as rather spicy. In the face of such behavior Bishop Cito interdicted the building by having an interdiction notice posted in front of the church door. The nuns counterattacked by appealing to the Holy Congregation of Bishops, which on July 22, 1677, exonerated them from the excommunication, recognizing the right of the abbess to appoint a chaplain. Bishop Cito did not digest this decision well since in the same year he did not give his consent for the monastery to collect a credit from the Universitas of about 100 ducats.

Bishop De Bellis in 1686, two years before the earthquake that destroyed old Cerreto, continued the reforming work of his predecessors by putting an end to some customs that had taken place in the monastery such as that of lingering long in the parlor, not listening to Mass every day, introducing children there and not dressing uniformly. This last provision was badly accepted by the Poor Clares but they eventually obeyed the bishop. It happened differently for another edict that Msgr. De Bellis wrote in 1687 that forbade the nuns to wash their linen outside the building. In fact, the edict, posted in the parlor between the two grates, was burned with the help of a cane passed between the bars and bearing at the top "a small lit candle." The perpetrators of the act, Sister Andreana Gizzio and Sister Romana Mastracchio, sent the burned remains of the edict to the bishop, who sentenced them to prison. And since the other Poor Clares "loudly clamoring" supported Gizzio and Mastracchio, they were all excommunicated. But the abbess of that time, Sister Giuditta Mazzacane, asked for forgiveness on behalf of herself and the other Poor Clares, and obtained the withdrawal of the excommunication from the bishop.

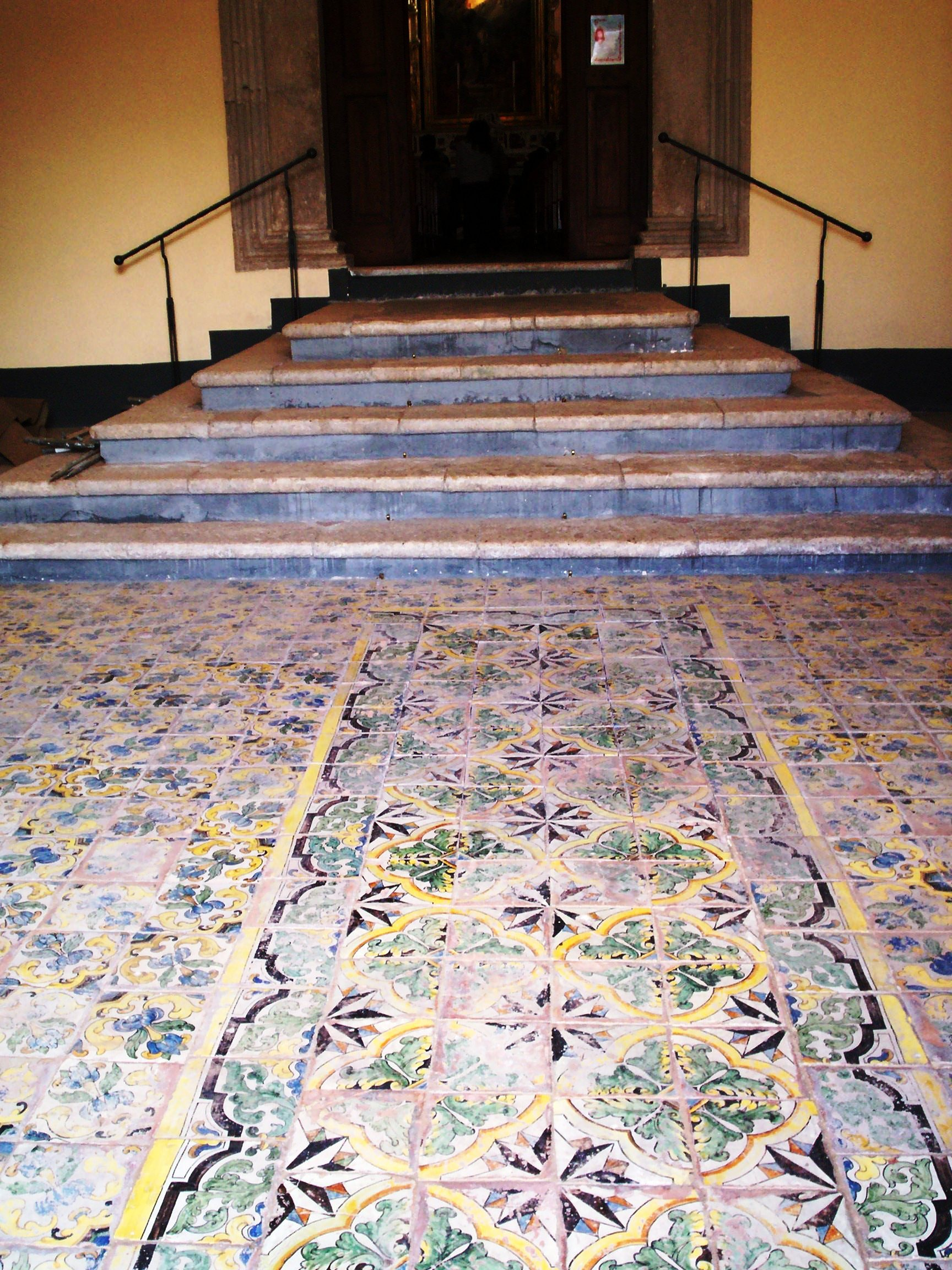
Floor of the pronaos

The ceremony in which the girls became nuns, known as "profession," was an important event where the most influential local civil and ecclesiastical authorities attended. At the end of the rite a speaker would read an oration in Latin and Vulgar Latin which was then also distributed to those present. It was not a moment of celebration and joy the profession that was to be made by Maria Cecilia Mazzella of Vitulano on July 3, 1740. On that day it happened that sacristan Domenico Tacinella mistakenly placed, in contravention of the bishop's wishes, two leather chairs "for Mr. Governor of the County, ahead of the first row of straw chairs," which, however, were immediately removed. When Governor Gennaro de Porres and his nephew arrived, he, perhaps already having been forewarned, ordered the sacristan to bring back the leather chairs where he sat with his companion. The intervening nuns and people began to comment under their breath on the fact while no one dared to contradict De Porres' arrogance. Bishop Msgr. Antonio Falangola arrived and was informed of the incident by chaplain Don Francesco Cerro, so he interdicted the church and cancelled the ceremony, ordering to be returned to the Episcope.

At the end of the 18th century, the monastery was at the center of two different chronicle events. The first involved Maria Antonia Cestaro, a young nun who was forced to take the veil when she was only sixteen years old with her father's promise to later take her to a monastery in Naples. When her father died, not only would the promise made to his daughter be forgotten, but he even assigned her only 36 ducats a year of annuity against the 144 of his footman. Faced with the fall of this hope, Cestaro, in 1783, begged Msgr. Pascale and King Ferdinand IV to transfer her to Naples, but the sovereign, having heard the bishop's negative opinion, recused the plea, thus making the nun spend the rest of her life in the monastery of Cerreto. In 1778, however, it happened that following the death of Sister Maria Angela d'Adona, her niece Sister Maria Serafina took possession of the keys to the cell, declaring that her aunt, when the monastery was built, contributed the sum of 40 ducats. The abbess and the other Poor Clares appealed to Bishop Msgr. Pascale, who rejected d'Adona's attitude.

== Description ==
=== Former monastery ("Istituto Leone XIII") ===
The Former Monastery of the Poor Clares, Istituto Leone XIII since 1930, is an imposing square-plan complex with a vast 1,500 sq. m. internal cloister and a large back garden. Of the original building intended to house the Poor Clare nuns, only a few cell exits on the facade facing Rome Square, the parlor and the "prison" remain, having undergone radical architectural transformations in the 20th century.

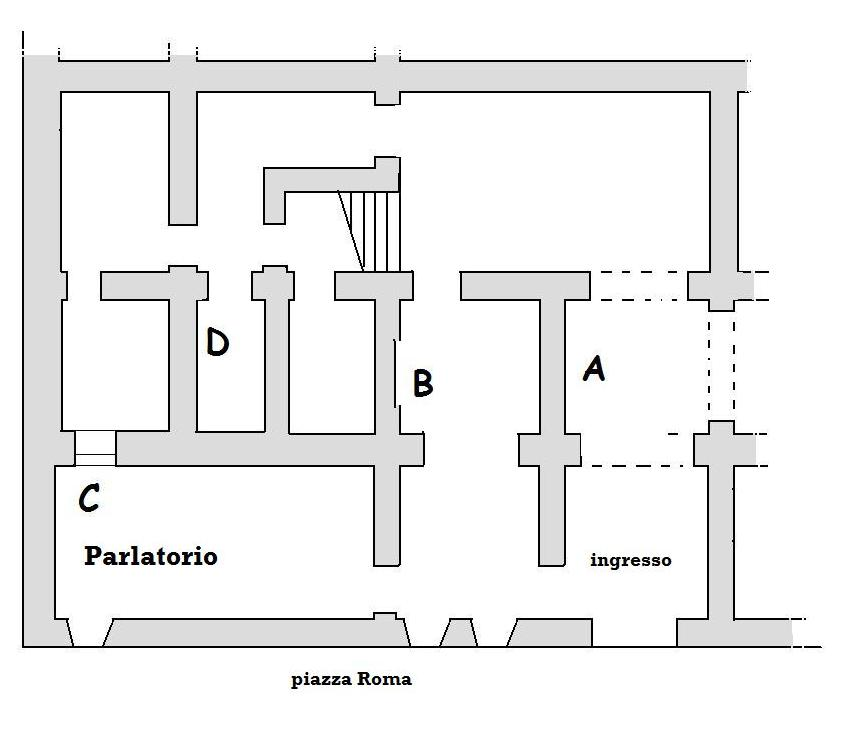
Floor plan of the parlor area of the monastery: A) monument to the first abbess Caterina Sanframondi; B) wheel of the outcasts (now a wall cabinet); C) parlor grate; D) "prison" cell

In the entrance hall is the funeral monument of the first abbess, Caterina Sanframondi, consisting of a bas-relief with her effigy and the coats of arms of the Angevins and Sanframondi, and a long inscription in Latin, added in 1846. To the left is access to the room where the wheel of outcasts was once located, which allowed the nuns to exchange artifacts with the outside world. The next room, on the other hand, is the parlor. Here the nuns would talk, through a grate, with relatives. The path the Poor Clares took to reach the parlor, behind the gratings, is of interest. Still intact, it consists of a long set of dark corridors, lit only at the end by a small doorway located high up in the wall. The "prison" cell, intended to house the disobedient nuns, is cramped and has no window or opening to the outside.

The refectory was housed in a vast room that today has become the seat of the meetings of the General Council of the Titerno Mountain Community, while under the current kitchen there is the granary and a series of tunnels that passing below the vast cloister joined the different wings of the complex. A high wall, on the other hand, surrounds the back garden where the nuns' burials are located and a building now abandoned where there are several tanks for washing clothes, a large oven and the ancient kitchen.

On the corner of Piazza Roma and Via Telesina, in the monastery block, is the "Old Forge," an old smith workshop.

=== Church ===
The Church of the Poor Clares or Santa Maria Mater Christi, attached to the monastery, has a single hall with pronaos, side altars and dome. The exterior prior to recent restoration work was of exposed gray tuff.

In the interior, gilded wooden grilles from which the Poor Clare nuns listened to Mass are located on the cornices of the walls to the left and behind the high altar. The church's pronaos consists of a large room paved entirely in 18th-century ceramic tiles.

==== Altars on the left ====
- First altar: was built by Abbess Anna lucia De Nigris originally in wood and then rebuilt in polychrome inlaid marble in 1738, following an episcopal order. On the altar is a Baroque painting depicting the Assumption of the Virgin with the De Nigris coat of arms at the bottom.
- Second altar: erected by Sister Marianna Mazzacane in 1746 and consecrated by Bishop Falangola the following year, with a painting depicting the Adoration of the Magi;
- Third altar: commissioned by Sisters Angela Teresa and Maria Magdalena Cestari, with an 18th-century canvas depicting the Immaculate Conception between Saints Vincent and Gregory.
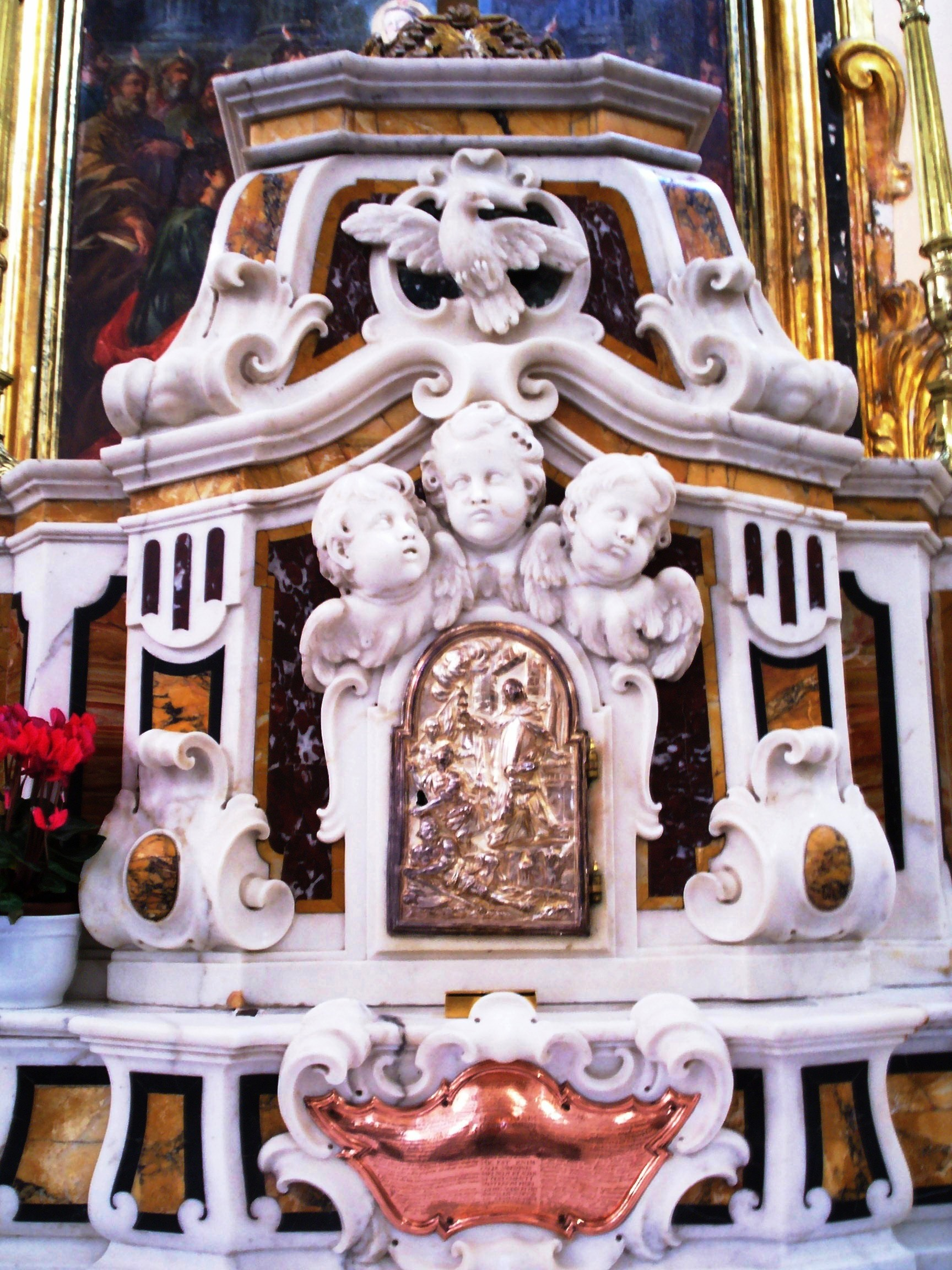
  Detail of the high altar in polychrome marble

==== Chancel ====
Preceding the chancel is the main arch on whose pillars are two oval paintings depicting St. Clare and St. Francis. The high altar, set off from the back wall, is in polychrome inlaid marble and dates from 1738. At its base is a bas-relief depicting the Good Shepherd. On the back wall is an 18th-century canvas depicting the Pentecost with the Virgin surrounded by apostles.

Behind the high altar are the remains of the church's old ceramic floor with a wind rose motif. To the left of those viewing the altar is a small window from which the nuns received the Eucharist.

==== Sacristy ====
In a large room adjoining the sacristy there is an exhibition of artifacts of historical and artistic interest that trace the history of the monastery and especially that of the Sisters of Charity of Our Lady of Good and Perpetual Help, from their arrival in Cerreto Sannita in 1888 until the present day.

==== Altars on the right ====
- First altar: there is a wooden crucifix. The drapery behind covers a 19th-century fresco depicting Jerusalem
- Second altar: an 18th-century painting depicting St. Mary of the Angels
- Subsequent to the second altar is the Baroque pulpit made of richly carved and gilded wood, with rinceau decoration

==== Chapel ====
Parallel to the church, but smaller, is a chapel containing a wooden altar and 18th-century sculptures.

== See also ==
- Cerreto Sannita
- Poor Clares
- 1688 Sannio earthquake

== Bibliography ==
- AA.VV. (1991). Cerreto Sannita: Testimonianze d'arte tra Settecento e Ottocento. E.S.I.
- ANCESCAO Sez. di Cerreto Sannita (2008). Guida di Cerreto Sannita 2009. ANCESCAO.
- Biondi, Salvatore (2001). Storia delle antichissime ceramiche di Cerreto Sannita. ristampa della Pro Loco.
- Marocco, Dante (1971). Sulla genealogia dei Sanframondo. Grafiche Grillo.
- Mazzacane, Vincenzo (1953). Il terremoto di Cerreto del 5 giugno 1688: Memoria di una suora del monastero delle Clarisse. Samnium.
- Mazzacane, Vincenzo (1990). Memorie storiche di Cerreto Sannita. Liguori Editore.
- Pescitelli, Renato (1977). Chiesa Telesina: luoghi di culto, di educazione e di assistenza nel XVI e XVII secolo. Auxiliatrix.
- Pescitelli, Renato (2001). Palazzi, Case e famiglie cerretesi del XVIII secolo: la rinascita, l'urbanistica e la società di Cerreto Sannita dopo il sisma del 1688. Don Bosco.
- Pescitelli, Renato (1983). Il Monastero delle Clarisse nella nuova e vecchia Cerreto. Rivista Storica del Sannio, II-83.
- Pescitelli, Renato (1969). Pietro Paolo Fusco nella Cerreto del primo '900. A.B.E.T.E.
- Pro Loco Cerreto Sannita (2003). Una passeggiata nella storia. Di Lauro.
- Rotondi, Nicola (1844). Del monastero di S. Maria Madre di Cristo di Cerreto: ragionamento. manoscritto inedito conservato presso gli archivi del dr. Renato Pescitelli e della Curia Vescovile (sez. Monache, vol. VI).
- Rotondi, Nicola (1870). Memorie storiche di Cerreto Sannita. manoscritto inedito conservato nell'Archivio Comunale.
