= San Rocco, Guardia Sanframondi =

Church building in Guardia Sanframondi, Italy

San Rocco is a Roman Catholic former chapel or church located in Rione Croce of the town of Guardia Sanframondi, province of Benevento, region of Campania, Italy. The building is closed due to risk of collapse.

== History ==
The octagonal church was erected in 1575 in response to the threat of a plague afflicting the region. The interior was richly decorated with stucco, and once had a number of altarpieces, including one by Paolo de Matteis. It is part of the route of the Rites of Penitence, held every seven years.
