= Pietraroja =

- Comune
- Comune di Pietraroja
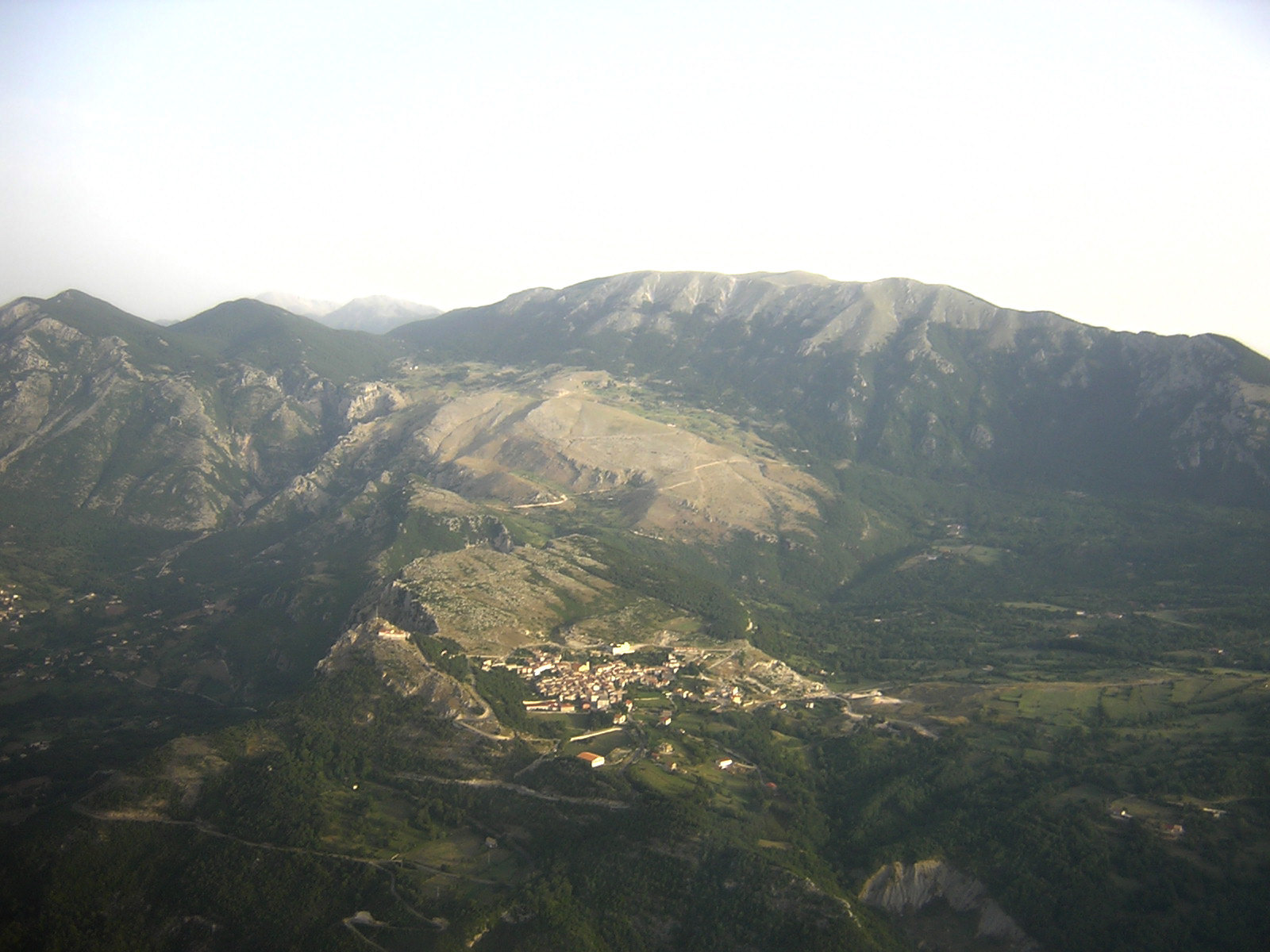

- Coat of arms

- Location within Italy Location within Campania
- Coordinates: 41°21′N 14°33′E
- Country: Italy
- Region: Campania
- Province: Benevento (BN)
- Frazioni: Mastramìci, Potéte

Government
  - Mayor: Angelo Pietro Torrillo

Area
  - Total: 35.60 km^{2} (13.75 sq mi)
- Elevation: 818 m (2,684 ft)

Population (1 January 2020)
  - Total: 515
  - Density: 14.5/km^{2} (37.5/sq mi)
- Demonym: Pietrarojesi (Petriàni in dialect)
- Time zone: UTC+1 (CET)
  - Summer (DST): UTC+2 (CEST)
- Postal code: 82030
- Dialing code: 0824
- ISTAT code: 062051
- Patron saint: Saint Nicholas
- Saint day: 6 December
- Website: Official website

Pietraroja is a mountain comune (municipality) in the province of Benevento in Campania, southern Italy. It is approximately 50 km by car from Benevento, in direction north-west, 83 km from Naples in direction north-east and approximately 223 km from Rome in direction south-east.

== Geography ==
Pietraroja is the second comune by altitude (818 m above sea level) of the province; it is limited to north from the western side, oasis of natural protection, of mount Mutria (1,823 m) in the southern chain of the Matese mounts (Apennines), to the border with comune of Guardiaregia in the region Molise. Its territory constitutes the high valley of the river Titerno, surrounded to north from Mutria and from Santa Crocella pass. Between these last two, in the place named "Tre Valloni", are the sources of the Titerno whose waters join with those of the torrent named "Acqua Calda" and, coasting along the buttress of Mount Mutria, they go down in the plain of Cusano Mutri passing through a canyon, delimited to north from the rocky table named Civita of Cusano Mutri and to south Civita of Pietraroja. In the Moschiaturo mountain is the source of other principal torrent, the Torbido, which crosses Métole and Potéte to east and to south of Pietraroja and flows in the plane of Civitella Licinio, hamlet of Cusano Mutri in which it meets the Titerno.

== History ==
Pietraroja has Samnite origin and has occupied various sites in its territory, currently on its fourth definitive site erected after the catastrophic earthquake of June 5, 1688. Its territory is part of the central-southern zone of the Apennines included between the Mainarde mountains and the Matese massif, inhabited in the antiquity by Pentri Samnites that set their capital in Bojano.

Its inhabitants had certainly involved in the Samnite Wars as well as in social ones against Rome suffering the Pentri's genocide perpetrated by Lucius Cornelius Sulla. The Roman domination Latinized the Samnium leaving also a greatest influence on Pietraroja dialect, in which it is lost every trace of Oscan language previously spoken by Samnites. After the Roman one, Pietraroja has undergone the various dominations of Samnium (Lombard, Norman, Hohenstaufen, Angevin, Catalan-Aragonese, Spanish, etc.). After Lombard rule under the gastalds of Telese, Pietraroja was part, from the 12th to the 14th century, of the fief of the Sanframondos, a family of Norman origin. Their possessions included, among the others, the territories of Cerreto Sannita, Cusano Mutri, Pietraroja, Guardia Sanframondi, Limatola, San Lorenzo Maggiore, Massa, Faicchio, Ponte as well as Dugenta in Terra di Lavoro and Bojano and San Giuliano del Sannio in Molise. In the 15th century Pietraroja was handed over to the Marzanos family and later to Onorato Gaetani. Subsequently, the town was held by the Carafa, whose possessions were also extended in Molise; they held it until the abolition of feudalism in 1806.

Pietraroja has been a centre of the Bourbon reaction after the annexation of the Kingdom of the Two Sicilies to that of Italy in 1861. With Guardiaregia, Sepino, Campobasso, Cusano Mutri it has been one of the centres of the brigandage of the southern massif of the Matese. In December 1863 the national guard besieged the brigands sheltered in the cave known as Cava dei Briganti and convinced them to go out, saving their lives in change. The promise was not kept and they were shot in the place named Aria corta situated behind the town building, After the unification of Italy, Pietraroja has experiment a strong emigration, especially towards the United States. After World War II, the flow directed to northern and central Italy and to Europe (Switzerland, Germany and England). The opening of a stone quarry in the place named "Canale", moreover closed subsequently, of a clay quarry in the place "Saure" no more drawn out for the cheap quality and of coloured marble quarry in the place "Pesco Rosito", open but never operating, did not reduce emigration.

== Climate ==
The climate of Pietraroja in the summer is rarely sultry. Due to the strong gradient in its territory, from the 450 m of the place Casolla, near to the fraction "Potéte" to the 1,823 m of Mount Mutria, notable differences in temperature are present, especially in winter. In this last season the cold is sensitive, mainly on blowing of the "bora", the northern wind. Snow is frequent especially on mountain areas. In the near skiing station of Bocca della Selva (in the territory of Cusano Mutri) it is possible to practise the snow sports and horse-riding.

== Economy ==
The main activities concern sheep-breeding with production of exceptional handmade cheese and lambs, bovine breeding with production of caciocavallo (called "casecavàgli" in dialect), characteristic oval cheese whose pieces are joined in pairs with a rope and hanged on horizontal rods to mature them) and meat and the breeding of swine (pigs), at family level, from which are got, after desiccation by cold and by firewood smoke and following seasoning, the salted meats and the hams for which Pietraroja is famous. The goodness of this latest product is note through the centuries, to this purpose in the museum of Alife, a comune in the province of Caserta, it is preserved a manuscript, going up to May 29, 1776, headed "Fornitura di prigiotta al duca di Laurenzana da Pietraroia" ("Supply of prigiotta (hams) to the duke of Laurenzana from Pietraroia"), that is the duke Gaetani of Aragon, lord of the Piedimonte feud. In addition Antonio Iamalio, speaking of Pietraroja in his work on the province of Benevento "Regina of the Sannio" (queen of Samnium in Engl.) (1918), writes: "Flourishing there is mainly the breeding of swine, from which [are made] the famous hams of Pietraroja".

There is considerable production of hay as feed for livestock in stables during the winter period.

Pietraroja has a surface area for agricultural use of 1797.99 hectares (as of 2000).

== Name origin ==
Its name probably derives from the Latin petra robia ("red cliff") or from the Spanish equivalent piedra roja or French pierre rouge , due to the presence of some limestone of this colour on the oriental side of the Mutria, that overhangs it.

== Main sights ==
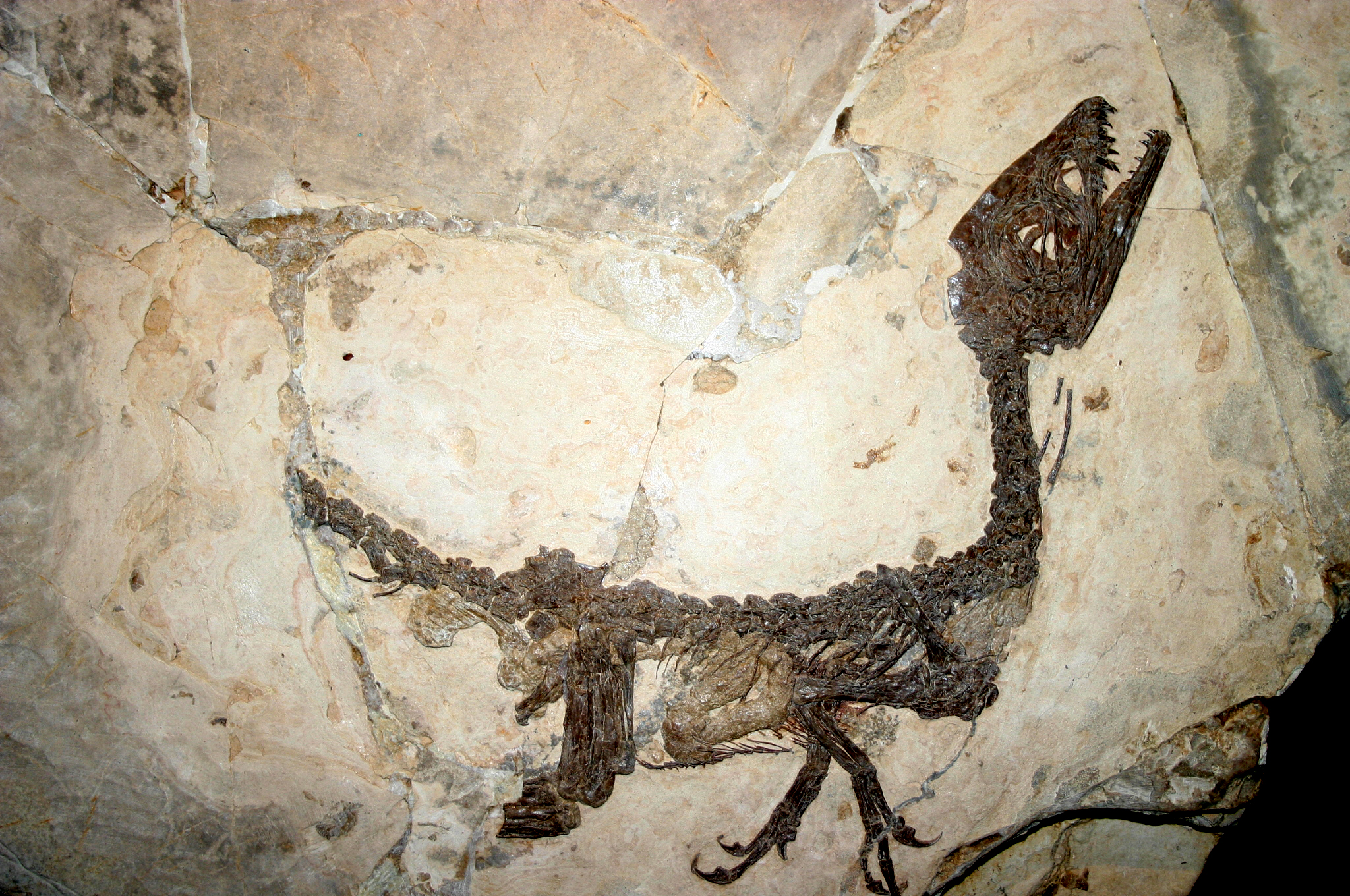
Holotype of Scipionyx samniticus, discovered near Pietraroja

At Pietraroja there is a geo-paleontological park with its museum, the Paleolab.

Here a juvenile dinosaur, the first in Italy, was discovered, in a fossil containing some internal organs: the animal was named Cyrus by media, while its species was called Scipionyx samniticus. The discovery of Cyrus has revolutionized the palaeogeography of Italy, formerly held underwater during the Mesozoic era. Among other fossils found at Pietraroja, are fish (including Belonostomus), reptiles (Chometokadmon, Derasmosaurus) and amphibians (Celtedens).

Other sights include the parish church of S. Maria Assunta in San Nicola (patron of Pietraroja) square, in the higher part of the municipality. It was erected with elements of the pre-existing Church of San Paolo, from the old Pietraroja destroyed by the earthquake of the 1688. It has a Romanesque portal (11th century) with the two sides supported by a lioness and a feminine bear nursing two infants and the high-relieves.

== Flora and fauna ==
Among the trees in Pietraroja's territory are the beeches ("fài" in dialect), the oaks ("cèrque"), the chestnut trees, the maples, the minor maples ("ócchi"), the elms ("ùrmi"), the firs and the pines (not native of the place), the poplars ("chiùppi), the ashes, the flowering ashes, the Turkey oaks, the lindens ("téglie"), the filbert trees ("ullàne"), the willows ("sàuci"), the osiers, ("vétèche") the wild apple-trees ("melàini"), the wild pear-trees ("peràini"), the ilexes ("ìuci"), the yew-trees, the junipers ("inépri") and the hollies ("arifógli").

Among the grassy and woody plants are aromatic marjoram ("mairàna" in dialect), oregano, thyme, wild fennel ("fenùcchiu"), anise ("pimpinèlla"), wild mint ("menta sàuza"), those edible chicory, asparagus ("spàracu"), sprout of butcher's broom, water cress ("cannea"), borage ("urràccia"), edible thistle ("càrdu chìnu")], those with edible fruits [the 2 kinds of blackberry bush with the corresponding fruits ("murrìcule"), the raspberries, the strawberries ("fràule"), the cornels ("vrignàli"), the hawthorn prunellas ("trìnche")], those medicinal valerian ("valleriàna"), angelic, gentian, gentianella, camomile ("cammumìlla"), hyssop ("isópu"), milfoil, the flowers dogrose ("rosa janàra"), hollyhock ("mmàrva"), althaea ("malvónu"), wild carnation, iris, cyclamen ("scocciapiàtti"), snowdrop, broom ("jnéstra"), poppy ("papàgnu"), daisy wheel, sweet violet ("viulètta"), primrose ("viòla iànca")], those poisonous belladonna, hemlock, hellebore, equisetum ("córa de órba"), mistletoe ("viscògna")]. Other plants of considerable diffusion are the red thorn ("spinapóce"), the masculine and feminine ferns, the elder ("sammùcu") and the wild elder ("mùnnegliu"), the rush ("jùncu"), the euphorbia ("tutumàglia"), the ivy ("èllera"), the wild carrot, the mercurial grass ("èrva mercurèlla"), the ononis spinosa ("rumàca"), the bittersweet ("turcamàra"), the soap-plant ("èrva sapunàra"), the arctium lappa ("cazzarégli"), the welted thistle, the carding thistle, the absinth ("nascénzu"), the rumex ("lampàzzu"), the verbascum, the wild turnip ("rapèsta"), the dandelion ("cicòria paròla").

The recoverable edible fungi are the agaric ("virno"), the field mushroom ("petranùgliu"), the craterellus ("scardarella"), chanterelle ("gaglinella"), the honey mushroom ("chiuìttu"), the cauliflower mushroom ("retélla"), the parasol mushroom, the Caesar's mushroom, the penny bun or boletus edulis and others not picked up by the inhabitants.

Also the fauna once numerous, reduced by hunting, is slowly recovered after the institution of protected oasis. Birds include eagle and the crow. Currently they are still found the goshawk ("rastarégliu" in dialect), the magpie ("pica"), the blackbird ("mérgliu"), the thrush ("tùrdu"), the woodpecker ("tòcculacèrqua), the cuckoo ("cucùru"), the crow ("ciàula"), the wagtail ("ciùcciapannèlla"), the wood-lark ("calandrèlla"), the robin ("pétturùssu"), the goldfinch ("cardìgliu"), the common chaffinch ("frungìgliu), the blackcap ("capunéra"), the thrush ("tùrdu), the mistle thrush (" tardèca") the nightingale ("rasciagnogliu"), the swallow ("rundinèlla"), the sparrow ("pàssaru"), the bat ("sparpagliónu"), the owl ("cuccuàina"), the long-eared owl ("àsciu").

Among the mammals are the wild boar, the fox ("òrba"), the badger ("tasciola"), the dormouse ("agliéri"), the hedgehog, the weasel ("nìzzela"), the mole ("tupanàra") and others can be seen. Other present kinds are the tree-frog, the green lizard, the toad ("óttu"), the snail (the white one and that great ochre)("ciammétta"), the water snake and the viper. Even if it is interesting, one pass over a lot of kinds of insects elsewhere disappeared for the intensive agriculture. One finally signalises the presence of trout and crayfishes in the torrents; these last, once present, are now in phase of reintroduction.

== Folklore ==
Pietraroja has also been hometown of wizards and witches (called janàre in the local dialect).

== See also ==
- Sannio
- Province of Benevento

== Sources ==
- Antonio Iamalio, La Regina del Sannio, P. Federico & G. Ardia, Naples 1918.
- Mario D'Agostino, La reazione borbonica in provincia di Benevento, II ed. Fratelli Conte Editori, Naples, 2005
- Rosario Di Lello, Brigantaggio sul Matese, i fatti del 1809 in Pietraroja, in Rivista Storica del Sannio, Benevento, Tip. De Toma, II, I(1984) pp. 25–36
- Di Lello, Rosario (22 October 2000). "Santa Croce in silva Sepini e Pietraroja in un contratto del 1274". Il Sannio. V. Benevento: Pagine Sannite: 11.
- Rosario Di Lello, "Le feste di S. Nicola in Pietraroja, tradizione e storia", in Annuario 1986, Associazione Storica del Medio Volturno (A.S.M.V., http://asmvpiedimonte.altervista.org/ )1987 pp. 143–148
