= Pietraroja Plattenkalk =

Geologic formation in Campania

- Stratigraphic range: Albian; ~112–100 Ma
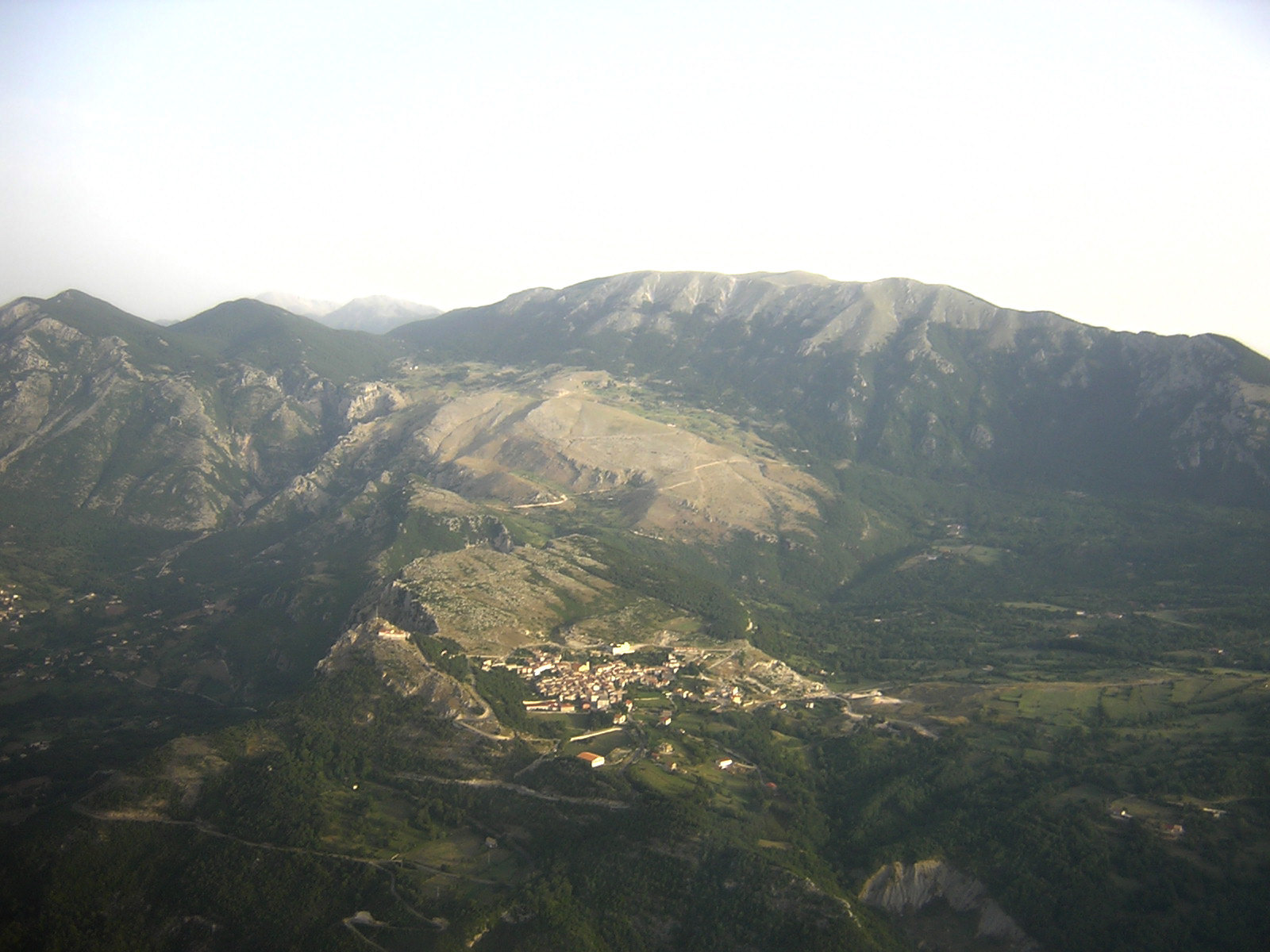
- The village of Pietraroja with, immediately above it, the Le Cavere quarry, where the Pietraroja Plattenkalk outcrops
- Type: Geological formation

Lithology
- Primary: Limestone

Location
- Coordinates: 41.3°N 14.5°E
- Approximate paleocoordinates: 23.5°N 16.2°E
- Region: Campania
- Country: Italy

Type section
- Named for: Pietraroja
- Pietraroja Plattenkalk (Italy)

The Pietraroja Plattenkalk is a Cretaceous geologic formation located in the Italian municipality of Pietraroja, near Benevento, in Campania region. It is of Albian age. Dinosaur remains diagnostic to the genus level are among the fossils that have been recovered from the formation and the type locality of the formation is the La Cavere quarry, which is near the village of Pietraroja.

== Paleofauna ==
Color key
Taxon	Reclassified taxon	Taxon falsely reported as present	Dubious taxon or junior synonym	Ichnotaxon	Ootaxon	Morphotaxon

Notes
Uncertain or tentative taxa are in small text; ~~crossed out~~ taxa are discredited.

=== Mollusca ===
Mollusca
Genus	Species	Location	Material	Notes
Bivalves		Cavere		
Gastropoda		Cavere		

=== Crustaceans ===
Crustaceans
Genus	Species	Location	Material	Notes
Astacidea	Indeterminate	Cavere		Originally identified as Pseudastacus
Huxleycaris	H. beneventana	Cavere		An axiid
Micropenaeus	M. tenuirostris	Cavere		A penaeid
Parvocaris	P. samnitica	Cavere		A caridean within uncertain family

=== Fish ===
Fish
Genus	Species	Location	Material	Notes	images
Aethalionopsis	A. robustus	Cavere		A gonorynchiform fish	Belonostomus crassirostris Gregoriopycnodus bassanii Ionoscopus petrarojae Italoalbula petrarojae
Armigatus	A. elatus, A. plinii	Cavere		An ellimmichthyiform fish	Belonostomus crassirostris Gregoriopycnodus bassanii Ionoscopus petrarojae Italoalbula petrarojae
Belonostomus	B. crassirostris, B. cf. crassirostris	Cavere		An aspidorhynchid fish	Belonostomus crassirostris Gregoriopycnodus bassanii Ionoscopus petrarojae Italoalbula petrarojae
Brauccipycnodus	B. pillae	Cavere		A pycnodont fish, originally classified in the genus Proscinetes	Belonostomus crassirostris Gregoriopycnodus bassanii Ionoscopus petrarojae Italoalbula petrarojae
Caeus	C. leopoldi	Cavere		A gonorynchiform fish	Belonostomus crassirostris Gregoriopycnodus bassanii Ionoscopus petrarojae Italoalbula petrarojae
Cavinichthys	C. pachylepis			A crossognathiform fish	Belonostomus crassirostris Gregoriopycnodus bassanii Ionoscopus petrarojae Italoalbula petrarojae
Cladocyclus	C. sp.	Cavere		An ichthyodectiform fish, originally identified as Chirocentrites	Belonostomus crassirostris Gregoriopycnodus bassanii Ionoscopus petrarojae Italoalbula petrarojae
Clupavus	C. sp.			An ostariophysian fish	Belonostomus crassirostris Gregoriopycnodus bassanii Ionoscopus petrarojae Italoalbula petrarojae
Coelodus/Ocloedus	C. costae	Cavere		While C. costae from Capo d'Orlando got own genus Costapycnodus, records of C. costae from Pietraroja actually represents Gregoriopycnodus	Belonostomus crassirostris Gregoriopycnodus bassanii Ionoscopus petrarojae Italoalbula petrarojae
Elopopsis	E. aff. fenzii				Belonostomus crassirostris Gregoriopycnodus bassanii Ionoscopus petrarojae Italoalbula petrarojae
Gregoriopycnodus	G. bassanii			A pycnodont fish, originally classified in the genus Palaeobalistum, Coelodus, Proscinetes	Belonostomus crassirostris Gregoriopycnodus bassanii Ionoscopus petrarojae Italoalbula petrarojae
?Hemielopopsis	?H. gibbus				Belonostomus crassirostris Gregoriopycnodus bassanii Ionoscopus petrarojae Italoalbula petrarojae
?Hypsospondylus	?H. bassanii				Belonostomus crassirostris Gregoriopycnodus bassanii Ionoscopus petrarojae Italoalbula petrarojae
Ionoscopus	I. petrarojae			An ionoscopiform fish	Belonostomus crassirostris Gregoriopycnodus bassanii Ionoscopus petrarojae Italoalbula petrarojae
Italoalbula	I. pietrarojae	Cavere		An albulid fish	Belonostomus crassirostris Gregoriopycnodus bassanii Ionoscopus petrarojae Italoalbula petrarojae
Italoelops	I. foreyi	Cavere		An elopid fish	Belonostomus crassirostris Gregoriopycnodus bassanii Ionoscopus petrarojae Italoalbula petrarojae
Italophiopsis	I. derasmoi			An ionoscopiform fish	Belonostomus crassirostris Gregoriopycnodus bassanii Ionoscopus petrarojae Italoalbula petrarojae
Lepidotes	L. sp.	Cavere		A lepidotid fish	Belonostomus crassirostris Gregoriopycnodus bassanii Ionoscopus petrarojae Italoalbula petrarojae
Notagogus	N. pentlandi	Cavere		A macrosemiid fish	Belonostomus crassirostris Gregoriopycnodus bassanii Ionoscopus petrarojae Italoalbula petrarojae
Paraclupea	P. pietrarojae			An ellimmichthyiform fish	Belonostomus crassirostris Gregoriopycnodus bassanii Ionoscopus petrarojae Italoalbula petrarojae
?Phorcynis	?P. sp.			An elasmobranch	Belonostomus crassirostris Gregoriopycnodus bassanii Ionoscopus petrarojae Italoalbula petrarojae
Pleuropholis	P. decastroi			A pleuropholid fish	Belonostomus crassirostris Gregoriopycnodus bassanii Ionoscopus petrarojae Italoalbula petrarojae
Propterus	P. scacchi	Cavere		A macrosemiid fish	Belonostomus crassirostris Gregoriopycnodus bassanii Ionoscopus petrarojae Italoalbula petrarojae
"Rhinobatos"	"R". obtusatus	Cavere		A Rhinobatid guitarfish	Belonostomus crassirostris Gregoriopycnodus bassanii Ionoscopus petrarojae Italoalbula petrarojae
?Sauropsidium	?S. laevissimum	Cavere			Belonostomus crassirostris Gregoriopycnodus bassanii Ionoscopus petrarojae Italoalbula petrarojae

=== Amphibians ===
Amphibians
Genus	Species	Location	Material	Notes	Images
Celtedens	C. megacephalus	Cavere		An albanerpetontid	

=== Lepidosaurs ===
Lepidosauria
Genus	Species	Location	Material	Notes	Images
Derasmosaurus	D. pietraroiae	Cavere		A rhynchocephalian. Initially attributed to Chometokadmon	
Eichstaettisaurus	E. gouldi	Cavere		A lizard, possibly related to geckos. One of the two specimens was found as the gastric contents of a second reptile.	
Costasaurus	C. rusconi	Cavere		A lizard.	
Chometokadmon	C. fitzingeri	Cavere		A lizard.	
Rynchocephalia indet	unknown	Cavere			
Sphenodontidae indet.	unknown	Cavere			

=== Crocodylomorpha ===
Crocodylomorpha
Genus	Species	Location	Material	Notes
Pietraroiasuchus	P. ormezzanoi	Cavere	Two articulated skeletons	Previously assigned to Pachycheilosuchus, now sister taxon

=== Dinosaurs ===
Dinosaurs
Genus	Species	Location	Material	Notes	Images
Scipionyx	S. samniticus	Cavere	A nearly complete skeleton in perfect condition	Tiny juvenile theropod	

== Paleoflora ==
=== Algae ===
Algae
Genus	Species	Location	Material	Notes
Salpingoporella		Cavere		
Thaumatoporella		Cavere		

=== Plants ===
Plants
Genus	Species	Location	Material	Notes
Zamites		Cavere		
Brachyphyllum		Cavere		

== See also ==
- List of dinosaur-bearing rock formations
- List of stratigraphic units with few dinosaur genera
