= San Sebastiano Martire, Guardia Sanframondi =

Catholic church in Italy

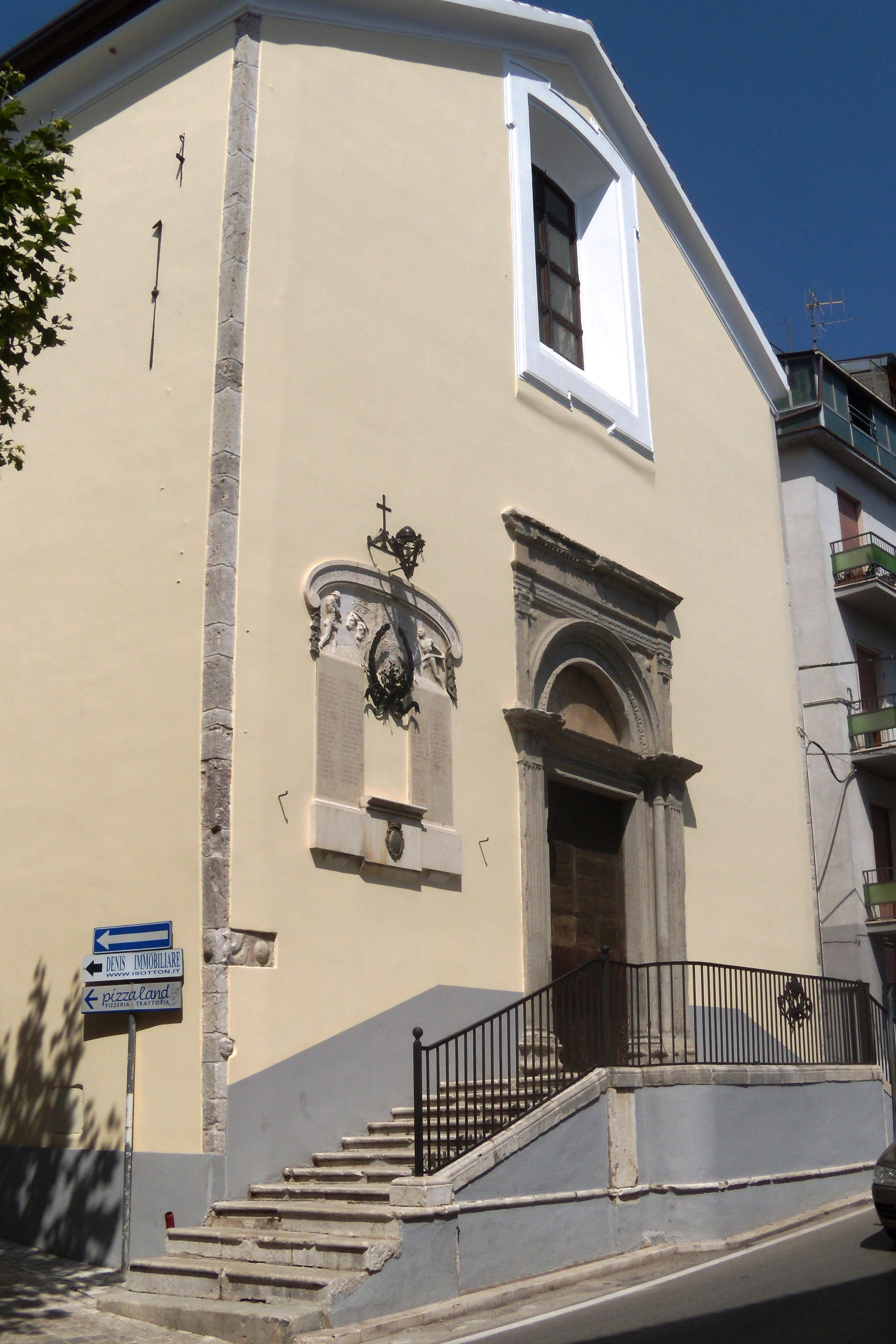
Sansebastiano1.JPG

San Sebastiano Martire is a Roman Catholic church located in Rione Croce of the town of Guardia Sanframondi, province of Benevento, region of Campania, Italy.

== History ==
The small church was first erected in 1515, but the present church, with a single nave and austere exterior date to the 18th century. The main portal derives from the 16th century. The small church has four lateral altars. The main altar (1729) is made from polychrome marble and decorated with stucco putti. Design of wall and altar decorations were commissioned from the architect and sculptor Domenico Antonio Vaccaro. The ceiling frescoes and canvases were completed by Paolo De Matteis. In the main nave, he depicted the Glory of the Virgin of the Assumption. In the surrounding paintings are the four evangelists and the seven moral virtues: from the left, Justice, Mansuetudine (gentleness), Courage, Prudence, Faith, Hope, and Charity. Other canvases depict St Jerome, St Agnes, the Holy Family, and La Pietà. Beside the apse are two canvases depicting St Sebastian healed by Irene and his Martyrdom. Above, in the apse vault, is the Glory of St Sebastian. The main altarpiece depicts the Martyrdom of St Sebastian.

== See also ==
- Catholic Church in Italy
