= Torrecuso =

- Comune
- Comune di Torrecuso
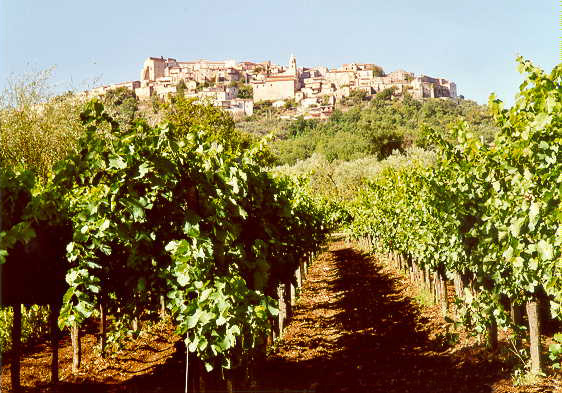

- Location within Italy Location within Campania
- Coordinates: 41°11′N 14°41′E
- Country: Italy
- Region: Campania
- Province: Benevento (BN)

Government
  - Mayor: Erasmo Cutillo

Area
  - Total: 26.5 km^{2} (10.2 sq mi)
- Elevation: 420 m (1,380 ft)

Population (1 January 2017)
  - Total: 3,395
  - Density: 128/km^{2} (332/sq mi)
- Demonym: Torrecusani
- Time zone: UTC+1 (CET)
  - Summer (DST): UTC+2 (CEST)
- Postal code: 82030
- Dialing code: 0824
- Website: Official website

Torrecuso is a comune (municipality) in the Province of Benevento in the Italian region Campania, located about 50 km (31 mi) northeast of Naples and about 10 km (6.2 mi) northwest of Benevento.

Torrecuso borders the following municipalities: Benevento, Foglianise, Fragneto Monforte, Paupisi, Ponte, Vitulano.
