= Paupisi =

Paupisi Pupìsë (Neapolitan)
- Comune
- Comune di Paupisi
- Location within Italy Location within Campania
- Coordinates: 41°12′N 14°40′E
- Country: Italy
- Region: Campania
- Province: Benevento (BN)
- Frazioni: Mandarisi, Pagani, San Pietro La Difesa

Government
  - Mayor: Antonio Coletta

Area
  - Total: 9 km^{2} (3.5 sq mi)
- Elevation: 320 m (1,050 ft)

Population (1 January 2020)
  - Total: 1,326
  - Density: 150/km^{2} (380/sq mi)
- Demonym: Paupisani
- Time zone: UTC+1 (CET)
  - Summer (DST): UTC+2 (CEST)
- Postal code: 82030
- Dialing code: 0824
- ISTAT code: 062049
- Patron saint: Anthony of Padua
- Saint day: 13 June
- Website: Official website

Paupisi (Campanian: Pupìsë) is a comune (municipality) in the Province of Benevento in the Italian region of Campania, about 50 kilometres (31 mi) northeast of Naples and about 12 kilometres (7.5 mi) northwest of Benevento. It covers approximately 9.0 square kilometres (3.5 mi^{2}). As of 1 January 2020, its population was 1,629.

It borders the municipalities of Ponte, San Lorenzo Maggiore, Torrecuso and Vitulano.

== Demographic evolution ==
Historical population

Year	Pop.	±%
1861	1,311	—
1871	1,309	−0.2%
1881	1,409	+7.6%
1901	1,651	+17.2%
1911	1,985	+20.2%
1921	1,884	−5.1%

Year	Pop.	±%
1931	2,233	+18.5%
1936	2,145	−3.9%
1951	2,265	+5.6%
1961	1,969	−13.1%
1971	1,948	−1.1%
1981	1,813	−6.9%

Year	Pop.	±%
1991	1,709	−5.7%
2001	1,521	−11.0%
2011	1,560	+2.6%
2021	1,522	−2.4%
2022	1,326	−12.9%

Source: Data from ISTAT
