= Ponte, Campania =

Ponte
- Comune
- Comune di Ponte
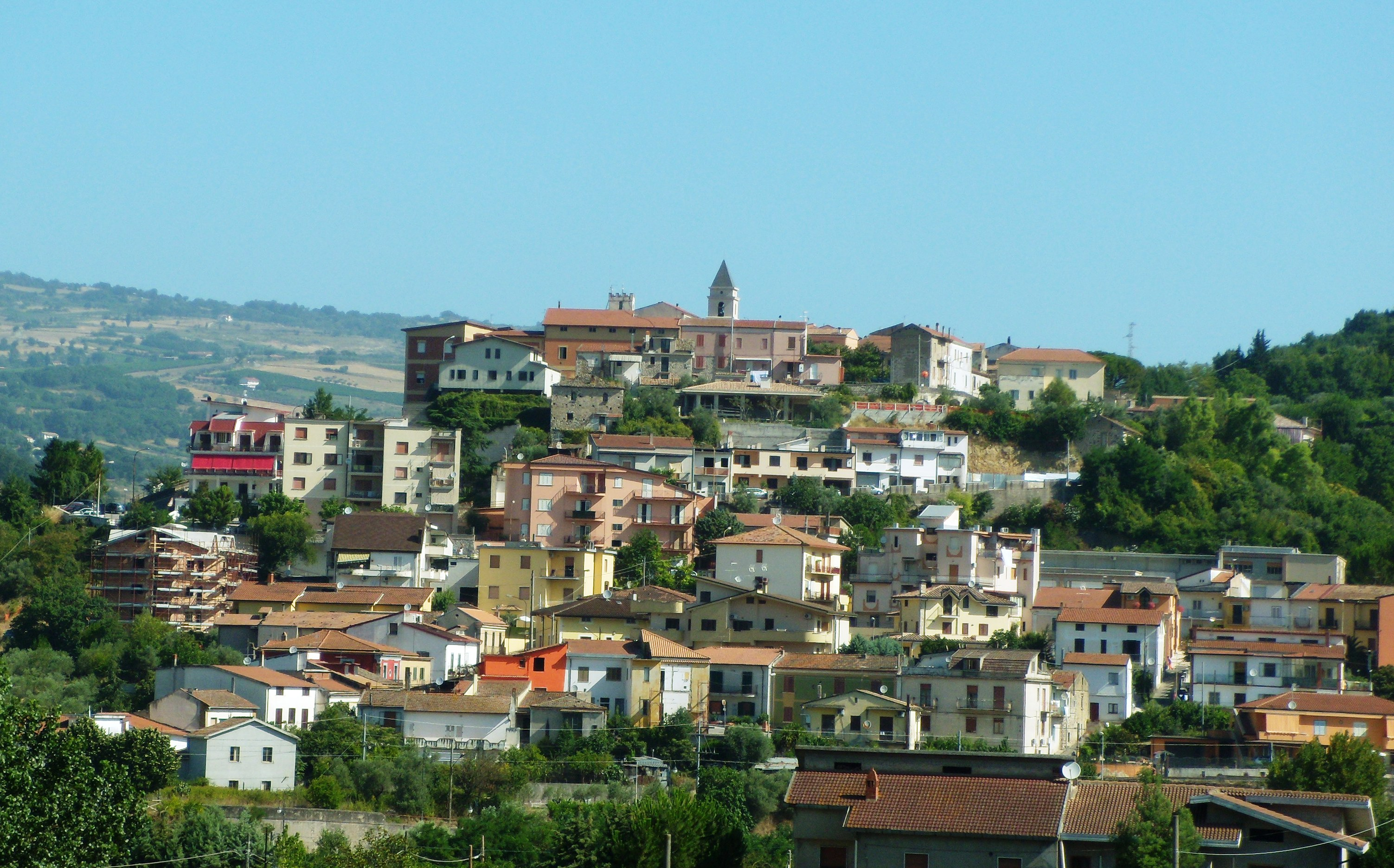

- Location within Italy Location within Campania
- Coordinates: 41°13′N 14°42′E
- Country: Italy
- Region: Campania
- Province: Benevento (BN)
- Frazioni: Canale, Colli, Ferrarisi, Monte, Piana, Puglia, Staglio

Government
  - Mayor: Antonello Caporaso

Area
  - Total: 17.79 km^{2} (6.87 sq mi)
- Elevation: 147 m (482 ft)

Population (1 January 2022)
  - Total: 2,428
  - Density: 136.5/km^{2} (353.5/sq mi)
- Demonym: Pontesi
- Time zone: UTC+1 (CET)
  - Summer (DST): UTC+2 (CEST)
- Postal code: 82030
- Dialing code: 0824
- ISTAT code: 062053
- Patron saint: John of Nepomuk
- Saint day: 16 May
- Website: Official website

Ponte is the name of a town and comune in the Province of Benevento, Campania Region, Italy. It is a member of the Titerno "Local Action Group" (GAL) and its name means bridge in Italian.

== Geography ==
The municipality is located some km in north-west of Benevento and borders with Casalduni, Fragneto Monforte, Paupisi, San Lorenzo Maggiore, San Lupo and Torrecuso. It contains 7 frazioni: Canale, Colli, Ferrarisi, Monte, Piana, Puglia and Staglio.

== History ==
Ponte has its origins in an ancient Roman stone bridge which was the passage of the Via Latina over the Alenta river. The first settlements can be traced back to Roman Empire times, in fact it was here that the roadway Via Latina, connecting Benevento with Rome through the Telesia Valley, passed. The bridge that passed over the Alenta river is today known as the St. Anastasia Bridge. The town was very important even during the Lombard domination. The old town is of medieval origin, although little is left of the castle of Norman origin built in the eleventh century CE. There was also a large Benedictine abbey built in the eighth century AD, the abbey of St. Benedict. The territory was ruled by Baldwin the Great, who took care of the development, renewing and expanding the ancient church of St. Denis. In later times, Ponte belonged to the major families of the Kingdom, such as the Sanframondos, the Carafas, and the Caracciolos, for example. Ponte was a stronghold of the House of Sanframondo, but during this period, due to a plague and a violent earthquake, which devastated a good part of the area, Ponte became uninhabited. In 1585 it was bought by Domenico Sarriano, whose family retained the title of Duke of Ponte until the abolition of the feudal regime. After being a fraction of Casalduni and Paupisi, since 22 June 1913 it is an autonomous municipality.
