= Ave Gratia Plena, Guardia Sanframondi =

Church building in Guardia Sanframondi, Italy

Coordinates: 41°15′17.8″N 14°35′46.3″E

Ave Gratia Plena, also called church of Santissima Annunciata, is a Roman Catholic church located in Rione Piazza of the town of Guardia Sanframondi, province of Benevento, region of Campania, Italy. The Latin Ave Gratia Plena is the Hail Mary invocation attributed to the archangel Gabriel when first communicating through the Annunciation to Mary of about her pregnancy.

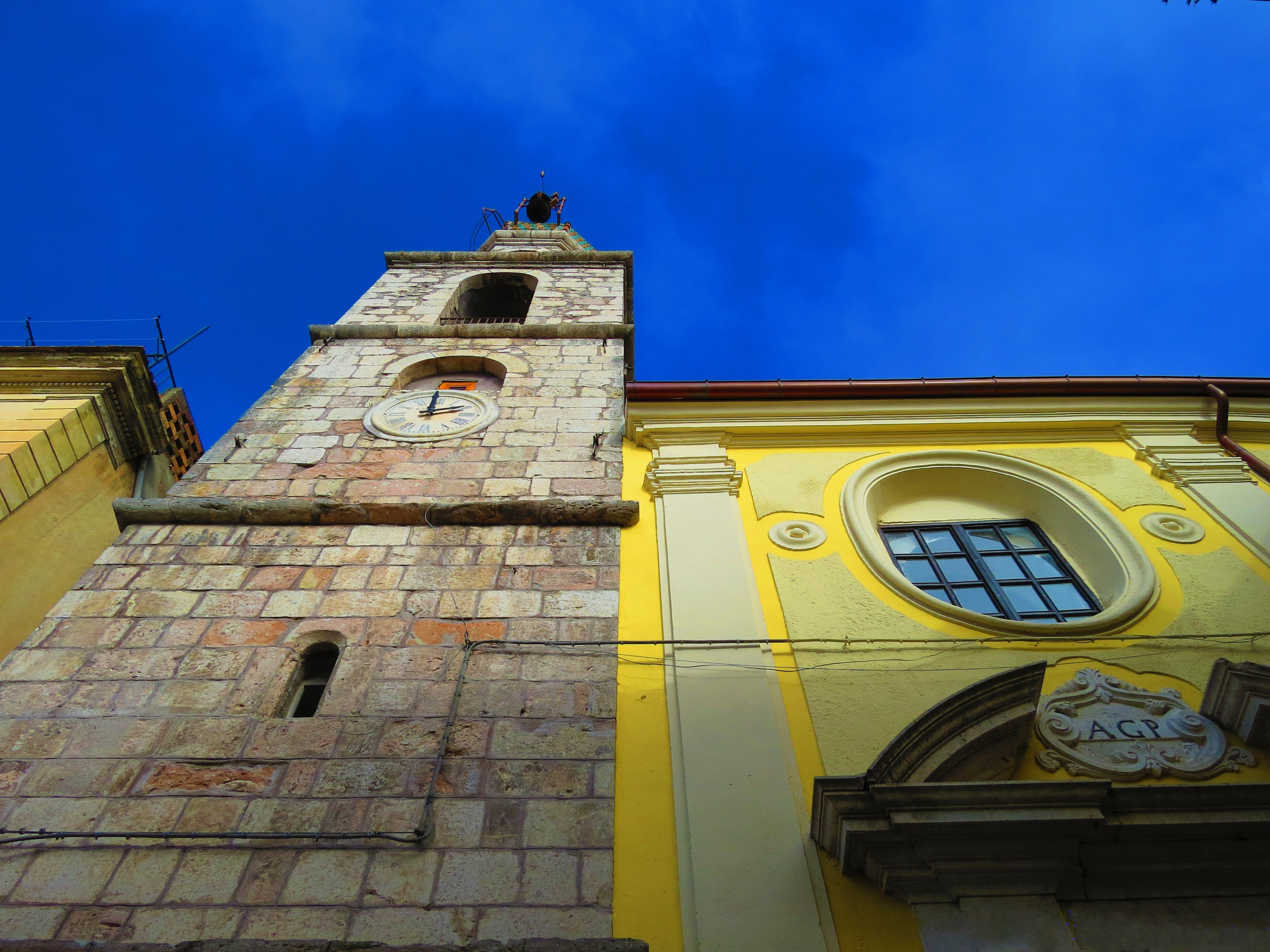
The bell-tower with the clock and part of the facade.

== History ==
The church was erected in the 15th century as a small chapel with an adjacent hospital and foundling home (brefotrofio). Enlarged in 1511, it was razed by the earthquake of 1688 and rebuilt as the present structure with a rectangular single nave and a paneled and engraved wooden ceiling.

The main altar, made of polychrome marble, once held an Annunciation by Paolo De Matteis. To the left of the entrance is a tilting belltower with two lions sculpted at the base and roof-tiles of colored maiolica.

The penitential rites held in Guardia Sanframondi leave and return to this church and are held during the days of veneration for Santa Maria Assunta.
