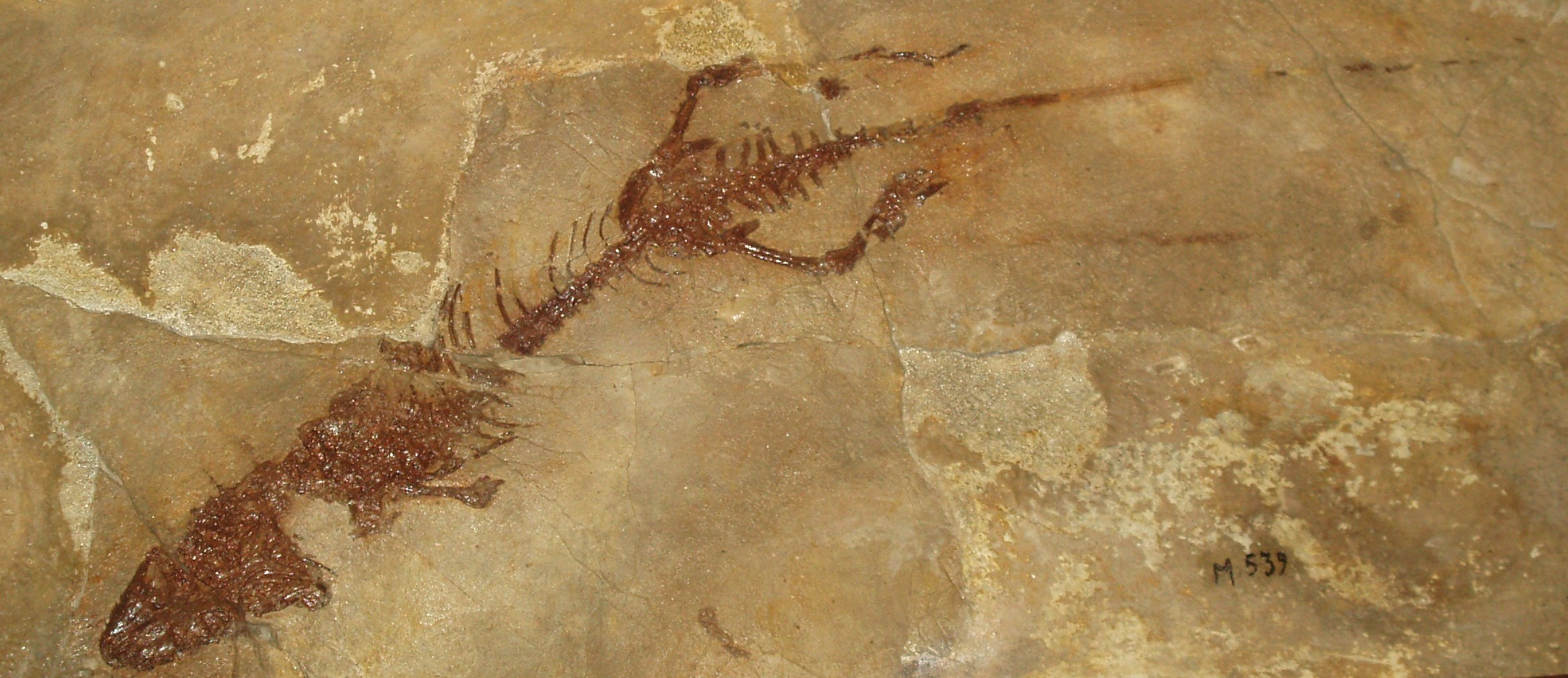
- Holotype skeleton of Chometokadmon fitzingeri

Scientific classification
- Kingdom: Animalia
- Phylum: Chordata
- Class: Reptilia
- Order: Squamata
- Suborder: Anguimorpha
- Genus: †Chometokadmon; Costa, 1864

Type species
- †Chometokadmon fitzingeri Costa, 1864

= Chometokadmon =

Chometokadmon Temporal range: Early Cretaceous (Albian)

Extinct genus of lizards

Chometokadmon is an extinct genus of anguimorph lizard from the Early Cretaceous of Italy. The type and only species is Chometokadmon fitzingeri, named by Italian zoologist Oronzio Gabriele Costa in 1864. It is known from only one specimen, a nearly complete skeleton from the comune of Pietraroja in the Apennine Mountains from the sediments of the Pietraroia Plattenkalk. Costa identified the specimen as a lizard, but in 1915 paleontologist Geremia d'Erasmo reclassified the skeleton as that of a rhynchocephalian on the basis of another rhynchocephalian specimen Costa had described, which d'Erasmo thought belonged to the same species. Later studies of the anatomy of these two specimens revealed that they belonged to two different species; Costa's Chometokadmon was a lizard whereas the other specimen, renamed Derasmosaurus in honor of d'Erasmo, was a rhynchocephalian. The first detailed description of Chometokadmon came in 2006, allowing it to be incorporated into a phylogenetic analysis of lizards. The analysis placed Chometokadmon as a member of the clade (evolutionary grouping) Anguimorpha, which includes Anguidae, Xenosauridae, and Varanoidea.
