= Titerno =

Titerno is a Gruppo di azione locale (Local Action Group) in the Province of Benevento, Campania Region, Italy. Member communities include:

- Castelvenere
- Cerreto Sannita
- Cusano Mutri
- Faicchio
- Guardia Sanframondi
- Pietraroja
- Ponte
- Pontelandolfo
- San Lorenzello
- San Lorenzo Maggiore
- San Lupo
- San Salvatore Telesino
