= Castelvenere =

- Comune
- Comune di Castelvenere
- Location within Italy Location within Campania
- Coordinates: 41°14′N 14°33′E
- Country: Italy
- Region: Campania
- Province: Benevento (BN)
- Frazioni: Marraioli, Parito

Area
  - Total: 15.2 km^{2} (5.9 sq mi)
- Elevation: 119 m (390 ft)

Population (1 January 2020)
  - Total: 2,629
  - Density: 173/km^{2} (448/sq mi)
- Demonym: Castelveneresi
- Time zone: UTC+1 (CET)
  - Summer (DST): UTC+2 (CEST)
- Postal code: 82030
- Dialing code: 0824
- ISTAT code: 062019
- Patron saint: Barbatus of Benevento
- Saint day: 19 February
- Website: Official website

Castelvenere (Castelvenerese: R' Viennr) is a town and comune in the Province of Benevento, Campania Region, Italy. It is a member of the Titerno "Local Action Group."

== International relations ==
=== Twin towns – Sister cities ===
Castelvenere is twinned with:

- Xewkija, Malta
