= San Lorenzo Maggiore =

San Lorenzo Maggiore Laurentini
- Comune
- Comune di San Lorenzo Maggiore
- Coat of arms

- Location within Italy Location within Campania
- Coordinates: 41°15′N 14°37′E
- Country: Italy
- Region: Campania
- Province: Benevento (BN)

Government
  - Mayor: Carlo Giuseppe Iannotti

Area
  - Total: 16 km^{2} (6.2 sq mi)
- Elevation: 330 m (1,080 ft)

Population (2008)
  - Total: 2,813
  - Density: 180/km^{2} (460/sq mi)
- Demonym: Laurentini
- Time zone: UTC+1 (CET)
  - Summer (DST): UTC+2 (CEST)
- Postal code: 82034
- Dialing code: 0824
- Patron saint: St. Lawrence of Rome
- Saint day: 10 August
- Website: Official website

San Lorenzo Maggiore is a town and comune in the province of Benevento, in the Campania region of southern Italy. It is a member of the Titerno Local Action Group.

== Geography ==
San Lorenzo Maggiore covers 16.17 square kilometers of hilly land and is bordered by San Lupo, Ponte, Paupisi, Vitulano, and Guardia Sanframondi. The Calore Irpino River passes nearby.

The town is just north of Mount Taburno and south of the Matese mountains, one of the largest ranges of the Apennines. Mount Taburno rises 1,390 meters above sea level, and the vegetation to its north consists mainly of copses, plus some stretches of high forests with beech trees and conifers. The part of San Lorenzo Maggiore by the Matese is more conducive to agriculture, particularly vineyards and olive groves.

== History ==
The area around San Lorenzo Maggiore has been inhabited since prehistoric times, as evidenced by several findings, including the "Mandorla di Chelles", a piece of quartzite that was probably used to skin animals. It was found in 1915 and is now preserved in a museum in Paris.

During the rule of the Lombards, a village called Limata was established near the Calore River, where a similarly named comune now stands. In 663 A.D., it was the site of a battle between the troops of Mittola, the Lombard count of Capua, and the army of the Byzantine emperor Constans II. Around 1000, Limata, thanks to its strategic location, became a commercial center and experienced rapid demographic change, which continued with the Norman conquest of southern Italy.

On 26 December 1382, Louis I of Anjou took the throne of Naples after the death of Joanna I. In the 15th century, Limata passed into the hands of the House of Carafa. Though the Carafa technically kept it until the abolition of feudalism in 1806, they preferred to live in Naples and essentially abandoned Limata. Some residents retreated to the nearby hills, where they founded San Lorenzo Maggiore.

San Lorenzo Maggiore was administered, like other towns of southern Italy, by a council of citizens appointed each year by local landowners. The town's population, 80 families in 1532, grew to 206 by 1595. The earthquake of 5 June 1688 caused extensive damage, but the town was rebuilt, and by 1724, it had 1,700 inhabitants.

== Places of interest ==
The remains of Limata are south of the town center. In addition, San Lorenzo Maggiore is home to several religious sites:

=== Collegiate Church of San Lorenzo ===
This church, in the town's historic center, was completed in 1417. In 1553, it became a collegiate church and underwent a series of expansions. The altar is surrounded by a 17th-century wooden choir area and is dominated by a painting of the martyrdom of St. Lawrence (San Lorenzo), made in the 18th century by Francesco Mazzacca. Also of interest are a wooden sculpture of Saint Lawrence; the bell tower, built in 1661; and the altarpiece, which features the Madonna with Child, St. Lawrence, and St. Amand.

In 1934, the church was visited by Prince Umberto II.

=== Sanctuary and Convent of Santa Maria della Strada ===
Centuries ago, according to legend, Mary appeared to a pious woman and invited her to dig at the spot where the church stands today. At a depth of twelve palms, the legend goes, the woman found a small chapel with an icon of Mary, which began to pour water when removed from the earth. The crypt of the church is said to be this legendary chapel. The church and convent were abandoned in the 19th century but restored in 1990. The building houses an icon of the Madonna and Child in the late Byzantine style.

=== Church of the Annunciation ===
Probably founded around 1550, the church was restored and enlarged several times over the centuries. In 1876, it was decorated with plaster made by Donato Di Crosta of Cerreto. Of particular interest is the Chapel of St. Catherine, which featured four white marble statues (some stolen in 1976) depicting St. Catherine, St. Peter, St. Paul, and St. Francis. Most notable is a very old sculpture of the Madonna della Sanità, from Limata.
