= San Lupo =

- Comune
- Comune di San Lupo
- Coat of arms

- Location within Italy Location within Campania
- Coordinates: 41°16′N 14°38′E
- Country: Italy
- Region: Campania
- Province: Benevento (BN)

Government
  - Mayor: Irma Cristina De Angelis

Area
  - Total: 15.2 km^{2} (5.9 sq mi)
- Elevation: 500 m (1,600 ft)

Population (2007)
  - Total: 845
  - Density: 55.6/km^{2} (144/sq mi)
- Demonym: Sanlupesi
- Time zone: UTC+1 (CET)
  - Summer (DST): UTC+2 (CEST)
- Postal code: 82034
- Dialing code: 0824
- Patron saint: Saint Lupus of Troyes
- Saint day: 29 July

San Lupo is the name of a hill town and comune in the province of Benevento, in the Campania region of southern Italy. It is a member of the Titerno "Local Action Group".

The town is located 60 km from the A1 highway, exit at Caserta, or is reachable by the Benevento-Caianello National Road. The nearest railway station is Naples-Foggia line. There are daily flights to Benevento and Naples. The town is also accessible by bus, on the line St. Wolf-Naples-Benevento-Campobasso, with links to Benevento (3 trips daily in summer and 3 runs in the winter), Naples (3 trips daily during the summer and 3 runs in the winter) and Campobasso (3 trips daily in summer and 3 runs in the winter).

== History ==
The first settlement dates back to the period between the 10th and 11th century AD by Benedictine monks who were attracted to these lands and called them "San Lupo and Zosimus." A major earthquake in 1456 caused serious damage, and forced the population to move upstream, where the village was rebuilt. In 1688, another earthquake destroyed much of the rebuilt village. The survivors rebuilt it on the hill above, where homes had not suffered very much damage, due to the rocky nature of the soil.

San Lupo was later a fiefdom of various noble families. In 1877 the town was the starting point of a failed uprising against the Italian government by the anarchists Malatesta and Cafiero. There was mass emigration to the United States, Canada and South America at the end of the 19th century. After the Second World War there was another wave of emigration to Australia.

== Nearby Towns ==
The municipality of San Lupo is surrounded by the following 6 municipalities: San Lorenzo Maggiore (BN) 1.3 km, Guardia Sanframondi (BN) 3.2 km, Casalduni (BN) 5.0 km, Pontelandolfo (BN) 5.6 km, Ponte (BN) 7.0 km, & Cerreto Sannita (BN) 7.1 km.

== Festivals ==
The feast of the patron saint, San Lupo, is celebrated each year from the 27th until the 29th of July.

San Lupo citizens participate in the penitential rite of neighboring Guardia Sanframondi.
