= Guardia Sanframondi =

- Comune
- Comune di Guardia Sanframondi
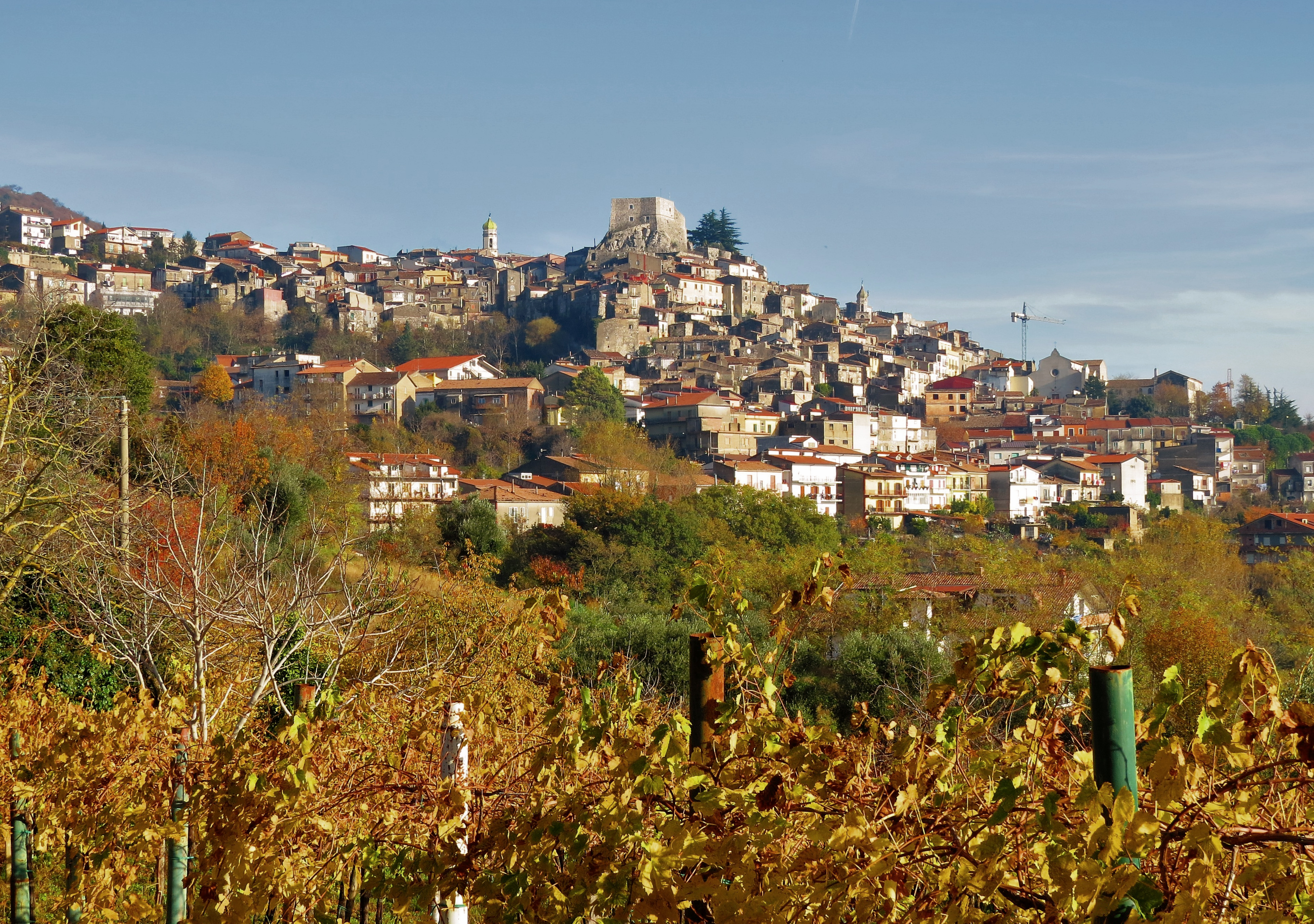
- Skyline of Guardia Sanframondi

- Location within Italy Location within Campania
- Coordinates: 41°15′N 14°36′E
- Country: Italy
- Region: Campania
- Province: Benevento (BN)
- Frazioni: Santa Lucia, Sapenzie

Government
  - Mayor: Floriano Panza

Area
  - Total: 21.1 km^{2} (8.1 sq mi)
- Elevation: 428 m (1,404 ft)

Population (1 January 2020)
  - Total: 4,755
  - Density: 225/km^{2} (584/sq mi)
- Demonym: Guardioli or Guardiesi
- Time zone: UTC+1 (CET)
  - Summer (DST): UTC+2 (CEST)
- Postal code: 82034
- Dialing code: 0824
- ISTAT code: 062037
- Patron saint: St. Philip Neri
- Saint day: 26 May
- Website: Official website

Guardia Sanframondi is a town and comune in the Province of Benevento, in Campania region, in Italy. It is best known for its wine production, the wine festival Vinalia and for its Christian penitential rite held every seven years.

== Geography ==
Guardia Sanframondi is distant 28 km from Benevento, its provincial capital. It comes as a characteristic medieval town dominating the entire Telesina Valley. The town is situated on the slopes of a mountain called Toppo Capomandro and it is very close to the river Calore, which runs through the nearby Telesina Valley. The upper areas of the town are characterized by conifer and oak woods, whereas the foot of the town are dominated by vast green expanses of vineyards and olive groves.

Guardia boasts a majestic medieval castle, from which it is possible to admire the vast Telesina Valley. Most of the historical center is accessible only by foot through narrow, stone, stepped streets and walkways. Much of the old town, where people once used to live, is now almost uninhabited, although there have been some improvements thanks to the opening of new restaurants, art exhibitions and the renovation of old crumbling houses.

== History ==
There are different opinions about the origins of Guardia: some scholars believe It dates back to Roman or Samnite times, others claim it was founded during the Lombard era, and still others believe that it belongs to the Norman period. Nevertheless, it is certain that this territory has been inhabited since ancient times. The Lombard origin of the town is reflected in its name; Guardia Sanframondi originated from the Sanframondo family, who held the fiefdom of Cerreto Sannita and its surrounding areas in the 12th century. The town was called Warda, which means “lookout” or “guard”, because of its geographic position. The Sanframondos built a huge castle in order to control the entire valley.

The village is known to have had a prosperous period in the early 1600s because of leather workers and became a rich and important economical center. In the 1800s, the Sanframondo family was succeeded by the Carafa family (the Counts of Cerreto Sannita). In October 1943, the town was destroyed by the US army in World War II. In the following years the town's historical center was subjected to depopulation, whilst houses have steadily been built in and around the surrounding area outside the old town walls. Nowadays the community consists of more than 300 foreign people. Many of them have moved to Guardia from US, Scotland and other countries, offering a contribution for cultural exchange.

== Penitential rite ==
Every seven years, Guardia hosts a riti settennali di penitenza, a Christian penitential rite that honors the discovery of a Madonna and Child statue in a field hundreds of years ago. The rite consists of a series of processions the week following the Assumption. Until recently, the rite was known only locally, but as residents moved elsewhere in Italy and abroad, word of the rite has spread. It has become something of a homecoming event. There are four components of the rite:

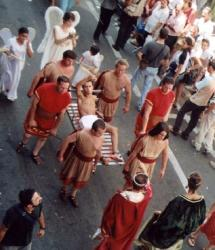
Mystery of Saint Lawrence.

=== Mysteries ===
Each of the four quarters of the town forms a committee to organize a parade of "mysteries" (religious scenes), with volunteers in period costumes from the Old Testament, New Testament, and Lives of Saints. The neighboring towns of San Lorenzo Maggiore and San Lupo join with the committees to stage a few of the mysteries. In 2003, there were about one hundred mysteries in all. During the course of a week, each quarter of town holds a separate procession through its neighborhood. On Sunday, all four quarters form a single grand procession, with participants holding poses depicting particular moments of the mystery as they walk through town—they do not act out events. The committees informally compete with each other to put on the finest mysteries.

=== Choirs ===
Each quarter also forms a choir that joins the processions. Traditionally the choirs were formed of unmarried girls, but recently married women, and occasionally men, have joined in. The women wear white clothing, a symbolic crowns of thorns, and braided cords around their shoulders.

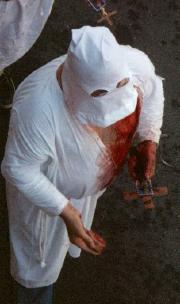
Beater with "sponge."

=== Penitents ===
During the neighborhood Christian processions, several flagellanti ("flagellants") join in. They gently strike their backs with a metal discipline. On Sunday, the procession is joined by several hundred battenti ("beaters") who strike their chests with a spugna (literally "sponge," an instrument of penance made of a cork disk holding dozens of pins). Designated helpers pour white wine on the sponges during the procession, supposedly to ward off infection. There are a few dozen flagellanti during the Sunday procession, who also provide crowd control. The flagellanti and battenti are anonymous. They wear white hoods and are not even supposed to tell family members they are participating. Scourges and sponges are not carried openly or displayed in homes after the rite. The battenti are all men, although a few of the flagellanti are women.

Additionally there are a few dozen symbolic child flagellanti. They wear black robes and caps, and very gently swing a small scourge over their shoulders.

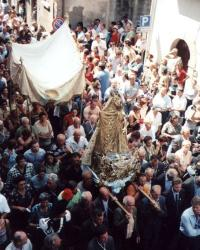
Madonna and Child procession.

=== Statue ===
The rite ends with the procession of the Madonna and Child statue through the town. After the mysteries start, the statue is removed from the church and a cannon sounds to announce the event. The procession stops and everyone kneels for a minute. As the statue makes its way to the town center, the battenti walk in front of it on their knees. When the procession continues, the crowds follow the statue, or walk backwards in front of it. The procession ends as the statue is returned to the church. All-night vigils in the Church of the Ave Gratia Plena continue for several days.

== Churches ==
- San Sebastiano Martire
