= History of Cerreto Sannita =

History of the municipality of Cerreto Sannita, Italy

The history of Cerreto Sannita includes a series of events that have affected the town's territory since the Neolithic age. The old Cerreto, built following the Saracen invasions and destroyed by the earthquake of June 5, 1688, was later replaced by the present Cerreto Sannita, built between 1688 and 1696 to the design of royal engineer Giovanni Battista Manni and at the behest of Count Marzio Carafa, his brother Marino Carafa and Bishop Giovanni Battista de Bellis. An episcopal see since the 16th century, it was a fief of the Sanframondo family from 1151 to 1460, later becoming a possession of the Carafa family. Flourishing wealth from industries and the wool cloth trade helped create a strong merchant class capable of resisting for centuries the constant abuse perpetrated by the feudal lords.

== From Antiquity to the Middle Ages ==
=== Prehistoric finds and the village of Cominium Ocritum or Cerritum ===
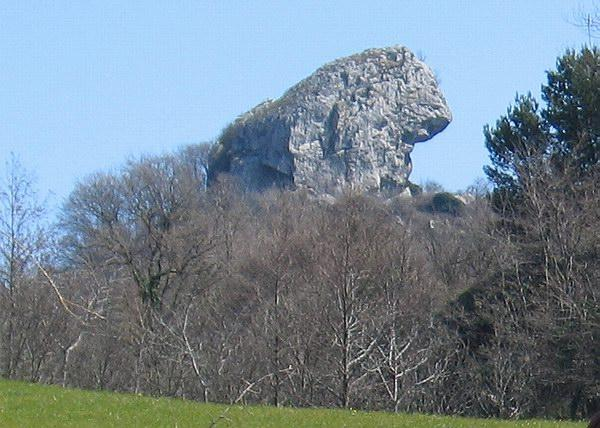
The Morgia Sant'Angelo or leonessa, which housed a prehistoric settlement.

The municipal territory of Cerreto Sannita was inhabited since prehistoric times, as evidenced by the results of some archaeological excavations carried out at the end of the 19th century near the Morgia Sant'Angelo or "Leonessa." In an early excavation a sarcophagus was found consisting of gray tuff slabs inside which were a bronze spear, pieces of burned wood, bone fragments, an axe, spear points and a cinerary vessel placed at one corner of the sarcophagus. In a subsequent excavation conducted by anthropologist Abele De Blasio in 1896, the following were found: a light-colored siliceous spearhead; a scraper; bone fragments of Bos taurus, Ovis aries and Sus scrofa; and fragments of handmade but poorly fired pottery shards. The remains of an archaic kiln were also discovered, confirming the thesis that the Neolithic man knew how to prepare, manipulate and bake clay.

The Roman historian Livy in his writings mentioned the Samnite village of Cominium Ocritum, visited by Hannibal's general Hanno during the Second Punic War. Later the name Cominium Ocritum was vulgarized into Cominium Cerritum. According to another classical historian, Polybius, it was Hannibal who reached these lands. The Carthaginian leader, after crossing the snowy Alps and defeating the Romans near Lake Trasimeno, was already in the Apennines in 216 B.C. and, after arriving in Samnium, "crossed the gorges of the mountain known as Eribiano, setting up camp near the Volturno River, which divides the plain in two." Then Polybius narrates that Hannibal, after crossing the gorge of the Titerno River that still exists today between Mount Erbano and Mount Swan in Cerreto Sannita, settled in the plain where he attacked the Roman city of Telesia.

The village of Cominium was located on the summit of Mount Swan and probably extended to the present location of Madonna della Libera where the remains of the base of the temple of Flora, goddess of the harvest, can still be seen.

A written document that corroborates the thesis of a Samnite-Roman settlement existing in the area where the temple ruins are located comes from a document by the Cerretan notary Mario Cappella dated 1593, which points out that at that time the people of Cerreto still retained the memory of a "village of the Swan Rock," corresponding to the Samnite-Roman village that was located precisely in the area between the temple and the "Rock" of Mount Swan (the terminal part of the mountain).

In the 1930s local historian Silvestro Mastrobuoni carried out a reconnaissance on Mount Swan in search of archaeological remains. On the mount he found and photographed "pieces of tuff that must have formed the vault of some room," and on the northern side of the mount, "where a kind of square can be seen we noticed a cistern and traces of ancient walls."

Other evidence of Roman times include some ancient silver coins found in the mid-20th century on Mount Swan and the so-called Hannibal Bridge where, according to legend, the Carthaginian leader passed by with his elephants to hide one of his spoils of war.

Cominium, at the fall of the Western Roman Empire, became a colony of neighboring Telesia and was part of its gastaldate. The Lombards around the year 700 transformed the cave of the Morgia Sant'Angelo into a chapel dedicated to St. Michael the Archangel. According to some historians, the cave of the lioness "must have originally constituted a pole of ritual aggregation, centered on the Michaelic cult after the antidolatrous work carried out by the bishops of Benevento Barbato, and of Capua Decoro."

=== The birth of ancient Cerreto ===
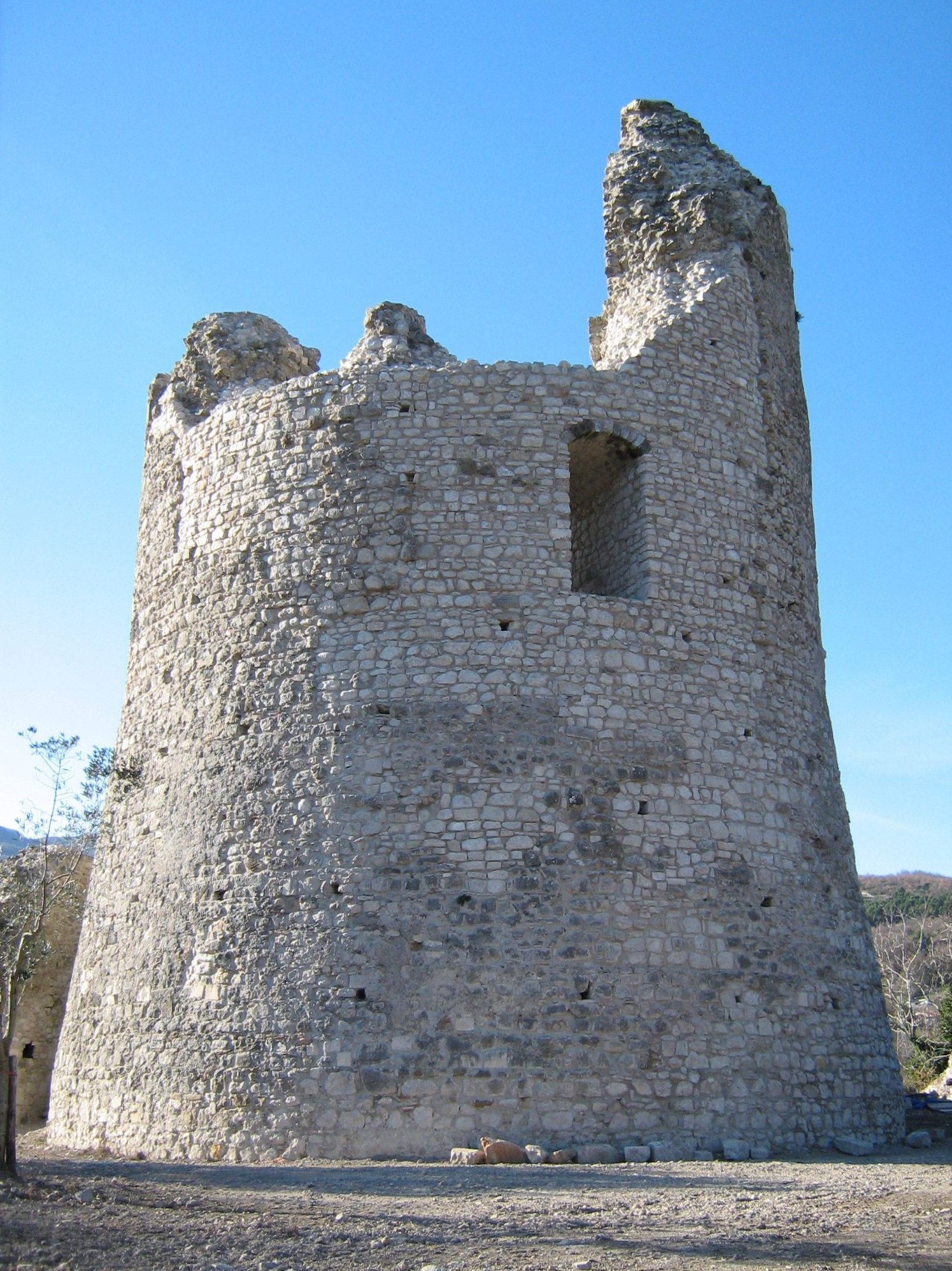
The ruins of the medieval keep, one of the few visible remains of old Cerreto.

It is widely believed among historians that Cominium was razed to the ground by the Saracens - who between 846 and 847 destroyed nearby Telesia - and that the survivors of Cominium together with some Telesinians founded a new town in a better defendable location.

The new town, initially called Cerrito, is now referred to by historians as Old Cerreto to distinguish it from New Cerreto, the current one, rebuilt after the June 5, 1688 earthquake.

The earliest document mentioning the village is a diploma dating back to the 10th century. In this diploma from the year 972, Emperor Otto II of Saxony confirmed the possession of the church of San Martino of Cerreto to Abbot Gregory of Santa Sofia in Benevento. This donation was later ratified in 1022 and 1038 by Emperors Henry II the Holy and Conrad II the Salic, respectively, and in 1088 by Pope Gregory VII.

Ancient Cerreto was located not far from the present town, on a wide hill lapped on two sides by the Turio and Cappuccini streams. Surrounded by mighty walls, it had four gates distributed three (gates Sant'Antonio, di Suso and dell'Ulmo) to the southeast and one (gate Gaudiana) to the southwest. At its summit was the castle of the Sanframondo family, surrounded by a moat, and on whose front widening were two churches, one dedicated to St. Anthony and the other to the Mother of God with the convent of the Conventual fathers and the monastery of the Poor Clares attached, respectively. In the belly of the city were the collegiate church of St. Martin and the church of Santa Maria in Capite Foris, which overlooked a large square that was the seat of economic activities and public offices. Near the Suso gate, on the other hand, stood the keep, the ruins of which still remain today, and which served as a prison.

One road, the Via Telesina, connected ancient Cerreto to Telesia.

In 1325 Old Cerreto was one of the most populated villages in the district counting 105 fires (families) and 525 inhabitants. The neighboring towns of Guardia Sanframondi and Cusano Mutri had 120 and 150 inhabitants, respectively.

=== The Sanframondo Counts ===
In the 12th century, with the Norman conquest of southern Italy, the town along with neighboring towns became the possession of Raone, the first count of Cerreto Sannita of the Sanframondo (or Sanframondi) lineage, who ruled these lands until the mid-15th century. In a diploma of 1151 William I Sanframondo, son of Raone, was count of Cerreto, succeeded by his son William II, who in the second half of the 12th century made numerous donations to churches and monasteries in the area.

It was due to the slow decline of Telesia and especially the earthquake of 1349 that Cerreto gained an increasing role in the area economically, commercially and demographically. Indeed, the 1349 earthquake devastated its Telesian soil, giving rise to asphyxiating mofettes. The survivors, to avoid death from malaria and other deadly diseases, moved to the nearest towns such as Cerreto, Solopaca and San Salvatore Telesino. The bishops also abandoned Telesia and wandered the diocese in search of a permanent home, which they found only in the 16th century in Cerreto.

In 1369 Francesca Sanframondi founded the monastery of the Poor Clares. According to Rotondi Francesca was the daughter of Giovanni III, count of Cerreto from 1285 to 1319 while according to Marrocco she was the sister of Count Giovanni and daughter of Leonardo Sanframondi.

In 1480 Cerreto gained the title of city granted by the King of Naples:

[...] head of the county, illustrious for the nobility of the citizens possessing fiefs, lavish for riches, pleasant for the air, fertile for the soils. Stately for the magnificence of churches and convents, adorned with palatial houses [...]

Sanframondo rule came to an end in 1460 when Count Giovanni unsuccessfully rebelled against the Aragonese.

== Modern Age ==
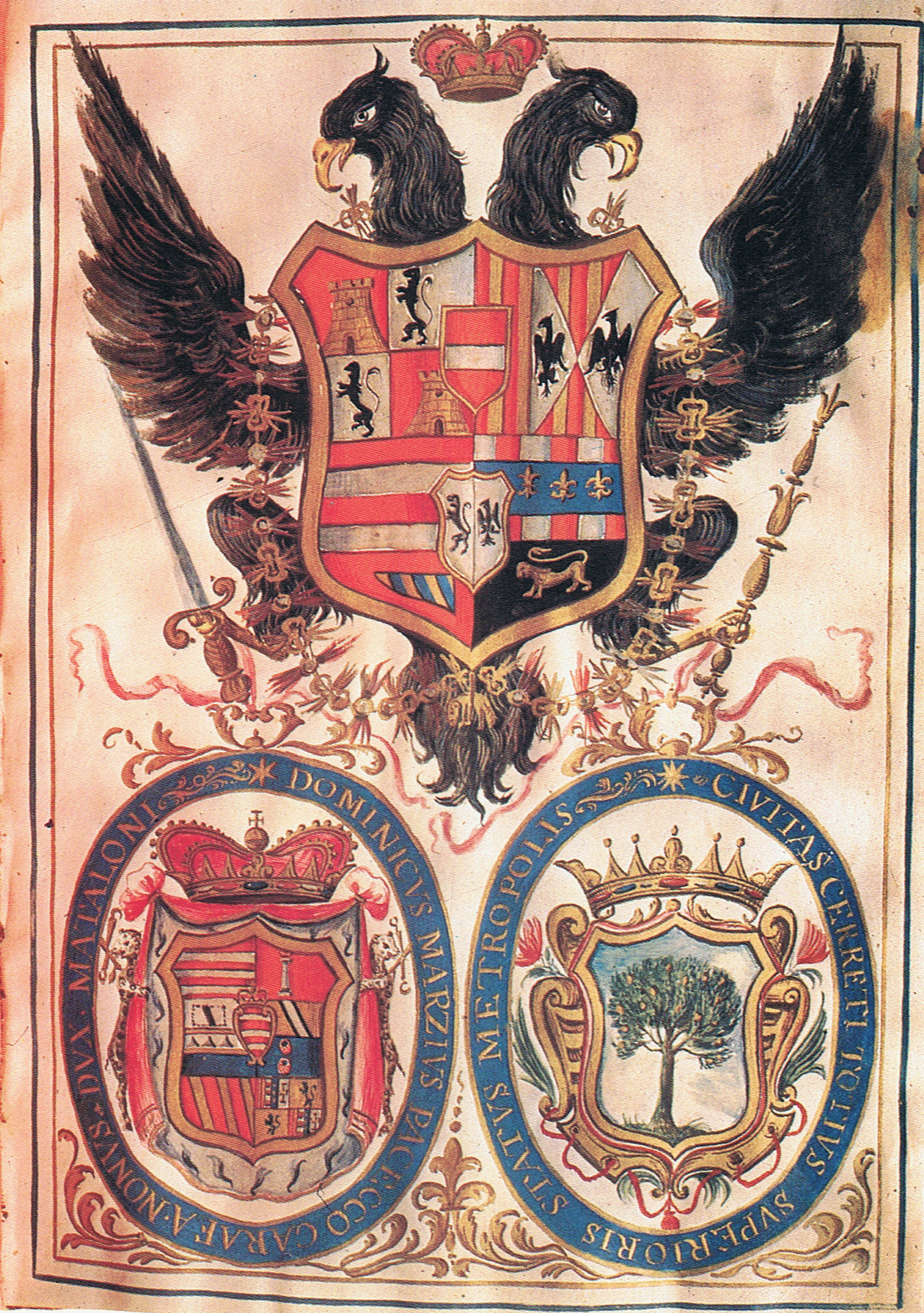
The Spanish coat of arms of Charles V, and those of the Counts Carafa and the Universitas of Cerreto in a copy of the 1725 Statutes.

=== The Carafa counts and the Statutes of 1541 ===
Having handed over the Cerreto fiefdom to the Royal Court, King Ferdinand I of Naples donated it on January 9, 1483, to Diomede I Carafa, whose work and that of his father Antonio, nicknamed Malizia, had contributed to the Aragonese conquests in southern Italy. Diomede was thus the first count of Cerreto Sannita from the Carafa lineage.

The Counts Carafa, who held the town and its fiefs for more than three centuries, that is, until the abolition of feudalism in 1806, proclaimed Cerreto CIVITAS TOTIUS SUPERIORIS STATE METROPOLIS (chief town of the upper county). The lower county of the Carafa family, on the other hand, had Maddaloni as its capital.

Notable among the Carafa counts are Diomede V who was involved in Masaniello's revolt, and his sons Marzio Carafa and Marino Carafa who were instrumental in rebuilding the town after the 1688 earthquake.

The numerous disputes that existed between the Carafa feudal lords and the citizens prompted Count Diomede III Carafa in 1541 to grant the Statutes, a collection of rules that included provisions on criminal, civil, procedural, administrative, hygiene, taxation and annona law. They were written in Latin, while the subsequent graces or placets were written in the vernacular with several phrases in Neapolitan.

With the approval of the Statutes, the inhabitants of Cerreto were granted the right to administer themselves independently within the Universitas (municipal administration of the time). It was administered and represented by four elected members (including at least one licteratus) and twelve councilors, half of whom were renewed each year following election by the pleno concilio formed by all heads of families, without difference of class.

Instead, the count was represented - since he resided in Naples - by a governor-general or viscount who defended his interests, administered justice and commanded a police squad.

Some of the rules of the Statutes dealt with the conjugal society, stipulating that the dowry consisted of one part of dowry property and two other parts in coin, to be paid half on the wedding day and the other half in the following three years. It was also stipulated that blood relatives and friends could only make gifts in money and not exceeding half a gold scudo. Nuptial robes were regarded as gifts, and in case of dissolution they became the property of the wife, who was excluded from the succession of family property unless there was no other male blood relative living.

Crimes were divided between those against persons (insults, threats, injuries) and those against property (usurpation, water detour, damages). The penalties imposed were in most cases pecuniary in nature and only a few times included imprisonment. Women who had participated in brawls or fights turned out to be immune from punishment.

Civil justice was administered in the first instance by the governor or deputy count before whom those sued had to appear, within three days of the same summons, under penalty of a fine of ten grana. Minutes were not taken in trials worth less than thirty carlins, and witness statements were made without oaths, which were essential for the prosecution in criminal proceedings. Appeals against the rulings of the governor were allowed to a judge in second instance, always appointed by the feudal lord.

From June 1 to the last day of August each year the sale of meat from dead animals was prohibited. In public spaces it was forbidden to macerate flax and hemp, to throw water, blood and garbage, and to wash clothes. It was also forbidden to attend baptisms in numbers of more than six men and two women unless they lived in the same house.

In 1571 the count granted "graces" that supplemented the Statutes and that concerned the preservation of the aqueducts and the magistracy of the master of the fair whose jurisdiction was extended by another four days. Also sanctioned was the restitution to the Universitas of Cerreto of military equipment, artillery, bombards and arquebuses transported by the feudal lord to the castle of Guardia Sanframondi and that of Maddaloni.

=== Society and economy before 1688 ===
==== The wool cloth industry and the birth of Cerreto ceramics ====
Beginning in the 15th century Cerreto experienced an important economic development due to the flourishing industry and trade of Cerreto's wool cloths, which gave rise to a rich merchant class that resisted the constant feudal attacks for centuries.

Each wealthy family and some fraternities owned varying numbers of sheep that reached very substantial numbers as evidenced by a will from 1500 and another deed from 1541 that mention two citizens of Cerreto who each owned over six thousand sheep plus mares.

According to historian Di Stefano, the total number of Cerretan livestock amounted to two hundred thousand.

In 1662 Ignazio De Amico, a judge deputed to the numbering of fires (families), wrote:

The largest and most important industry is that of sheep and cloth from which the profit to all the simple people and the occasion of traffic for all parts of the Kingdom results.

The flocks were brought to Apulia via the transhumance sheep trail. The number of sheep belonging to the Cerretans was so large that in the 16th century the "Locazione di Terra d'Otranto per i Cerratani" was created, covering 9258 hectares and capable of housing 30000 sheep during the seasonal migration of the flocks. This lease was part of the larger "Locazione di Terra d'Otranto," established in 1564 by the royal customs commissioner Gian Luigi di Sangro for the flocks of Basilicata, Terra di Lavoro, Principato Citra and Principato Ultra.

The processing of woollen cloth had created a real industry with several factories each competent for a specific stage of production. There were fulling mills, paper mills, and dyeing mills, respectively, for sodding and fulling cloth, pressing and unifying it, and finally dyeing it. The Universitas alone owned in 1625 fourteen fulling mills that were leased to private citizens of Cerreto.

In the 17th century, the importation from the markets of the Americas and India of indigo and its derivative colors brought significant innovations in the processing of Cerreto wool cloths: while dark colors (derived from nuts or tree roots) had previously been preferred, lighter colors began to be used more and more frequently from then on: light blue, violet, indigo, light blue, scarlet.

The feudal taxes were numerous and heavy, sometimes absorbing a large part of the price of the finished product. From a notarial deed of the time one learns that merchants preferred to dye their cloths in private dyehouses rather than in the ducal one since in the latter factory the manager had to pay a heavy annual rent to the feudal lords and, as a result, in order to recover the money, the manager spent little on colors thus impairing the quality of the product. The feudal lords, however, demanded duty on dyed cloth in both private and ducal dyehouses, collecting one carlin for each "long" cloth and half a carlin for each "narrow cloth."

Before the 1688 earthquake, ceramics were already being worked in the town, as evidenced by some documents and pottery finds made among the ruins of ancient Cerreto. Dr. Renato Pescitelli, a local historian, argues that before 1688 there were only less prominent potters, who could not be called "faenzari." (Note: A "faenzaro" was defined as a quality potter. The word derives from Faenza, Italy's major pottery-producing city. Other workers of lesser importance were the ceramic artisans, tableware makers and potters.) In support of this thesis, Pescitelli argues the lack of documents that explicitly mention the presence of "faenzari" in Cerreto, although Pescitelli himself admits the presence of several potters' stores in the 17th century as evidenced by two documents preserved in the Diocesan Archives of Cerreto Sannita. The first document mentions the existence, in the vicinity of the church of San Giovanni, of a street inhabited by several ceramic artisans while the second states that only "three small houses of a potter" were saved from the destruction of the earthquake of June 5, 1688. According to some historians in the documents there are no references to Cerreto "faenzari" because it was customary at the time not to specifically mention in the documents ceramic artifacts produced in Cerreto. This would explain why in period inventories, for some artifacts the municipality of origin is minutely indicated while for others, probably produced in Cerreto, such specification is missing.

==== The transfer of the bishop's see from Telese to Cerreto ====
The Patron Saint

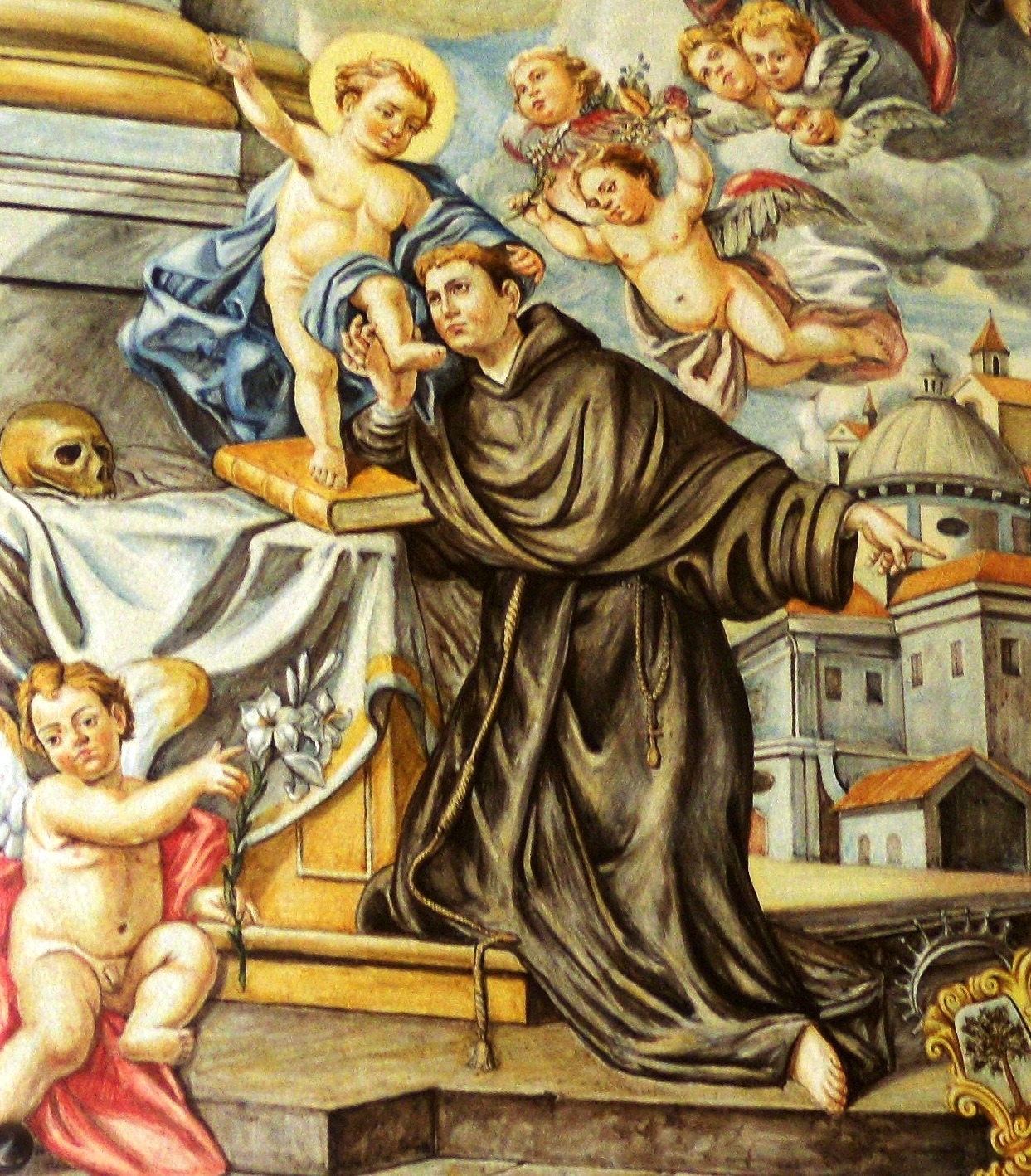
St. Anthony of Padua was officially declared the main patron saint of Cerreto Sannita in 1731 by Msgr. Francesco Baccari. But for many years before that he had been venerated by the people of Cerreto as such, as can be seen from a 1616 marriage trial from which it is reported that the marriage denunciation between the betrothed Giovan Angelo Mazzacane and Camilla Salomone took place "on the feast of St. Anthony of Padua, Protector of the above-mentioned Land of Cerreto." In 1721 Giovan Camillo Rosato, after kissing the relic in the chest of the silver sculpture kept in the cathedral, regained his speech lost during a long illness. In 1733 the administrators of the Universitas resolved the annual offering of twenty pounds of white wax worked on the occasion of the patronal feast.

In 1609, Bishop Msgr. Giovanni Francesco Leone appealed to the Dicastery for Bishops requesting the definitive transfer of episcopal and canonical functions from Telese to Cerreto Sannita "in view of the fact that both the canons and the Duke himself agree that any further stable stay in Telese is impossible because of the deplorable state of the Cathedral, the malignity of the air, the desolation of the city, left without a people, the pernicious existence of mofettes and stagnant and swampy waters, and also because the canons, in order to travel to Telese from the neighboring towns, suffered disasters and were assaulted on the road by thieves who hid in the nearby woods of Mount Pugliano."

The bishops of Telese habitually resided in Cerreto as early as the late fifteenth or early sixteenth century. In 1544 Msgr. Giaquinto wrote at the end of one of his decrees that he had been issued in Cerreto "nostrae solitae residentiae."

The collegiate chapter of San Martino did not welcome the final transfer of the episcopal see and cathedral chapter from Telese to Cerreto Sannita, seeing the episcopal canons as dangerous competitors. Quarrels began between the two chapters that often resulted in striking initiatives.

The canons of the collegiate church in 1630, taking advantage of the temporary absence of Msgr. Sigismondo Gambacorta and against the provisions of the bishop, welcomed with all honors, "[...] with surplice and stoles and cross [...] at the door of the land of Cerreto [... ] the same Duke of Maddaloni master of these lands, for his first entrance, and we made him kiss the cross by leading him under the canopy singing the Te Deum laudamus in their Church, where then the Archpriest sang an oration on the missal solemnly [...] with grave prejudice to ecclesiastical jurisdiction, the vilification of the Church and public scandal."

The duke of Solopaca Bartolomeo Grimaldi, probably incited by the canons of the collegiate church of Cerreto Sannita, in 1629 presented a memorial to the Congregation for Bishops pleading "on behalf of the people for the return of the Bishops and Canons to the ancient city of Telese." Bishop Gambacorta responded with a document in which he affirmed that "not the people of Telese, who are not there, but the Canons of S. Martino have organized the dispute; and as for the duke, they only forwarded the Petition because they were instigated, and little or nothing thinks of the service of said Cathedral, while they have other things to do and certainly not to repair the damage to the territories of Telesio and the Episcopal fief of S. Agatella that his animals do. Indeed, his predecessor for no less than 22 years had devastated the same ducal palace of Telesio, removing pieces of it to repair the fulling mill, the mill and the palace that was being built in Solopaca." The congregation rejected Grimaldi's appeal and confirmed the transfer of the bishop's seat to Cerreto Sannita.

On the feast of Corpus Christi in 1638 the canons of the collegiate church did not accept the fact that the Blessed Sacrament had to be carried by the Archpriest of the Cathedral, therefore they too carried their Blessed Sacrament and stood, in the religious procession, before the canons of the Cathedral. A trial ensued during which a witness stated that all the faithful were scandalized "seeing that two sacraments were being carried in a procession." The witness concluded by saying that the people of Cerreto, all upset by that scene, said that the world would sooner or later collapse because of the striking disunity of the priests of the two chapters.

In 1653 another serious episode occurred when during the feast of Corpus Christi the canons of the collegiate church, with the support of the feudal lord's personal guards, burst into the Cathedral during a mass to "[...] drive the celebrant from the High Altar, to the great scandal of the people." Not content, the canons, again with the help of the feudal lord's personal guards, prevented the Archpriest of the Cathedral from carrying the Blessed Sacrament in procession.

The hostile attitude of the collegiate canons toward those of the Cathedral originally was also shared by many citizens of Cerreto as evidenced by an event that occurred in the diocesan synod of 1610. The synod was disturbed by the elected members of the Universitas and some Cerreto citizens who asserted that the church of San Leonardo (used as the Cathedral) was under the patronage of the civic administration and therefore could not be used as an episcopal seat. For this reason Bishop Msgr. Leone warned anyone who hindered or harassed blacksmiths, workers and other people "who will work or fabricate or give adjustments to said pious work."

The people of Cerreto, in order to resolve the disputes between the two chapters, proposed as early as 1630 the erection of a parish in the Cathedral, which did not happen until the 20th century. On January 2, 1630 the elected members of the Universitas wrote to the Holy See saying that since the town had ten thousand inhabitants the only parish, that of St. Martin, was insufficient to contain the faithful. The petition ended with a request that the said Episcopal Church be "erected into a parish."

==== The clergy, feudal lords and the Universitas in the 17th century ====
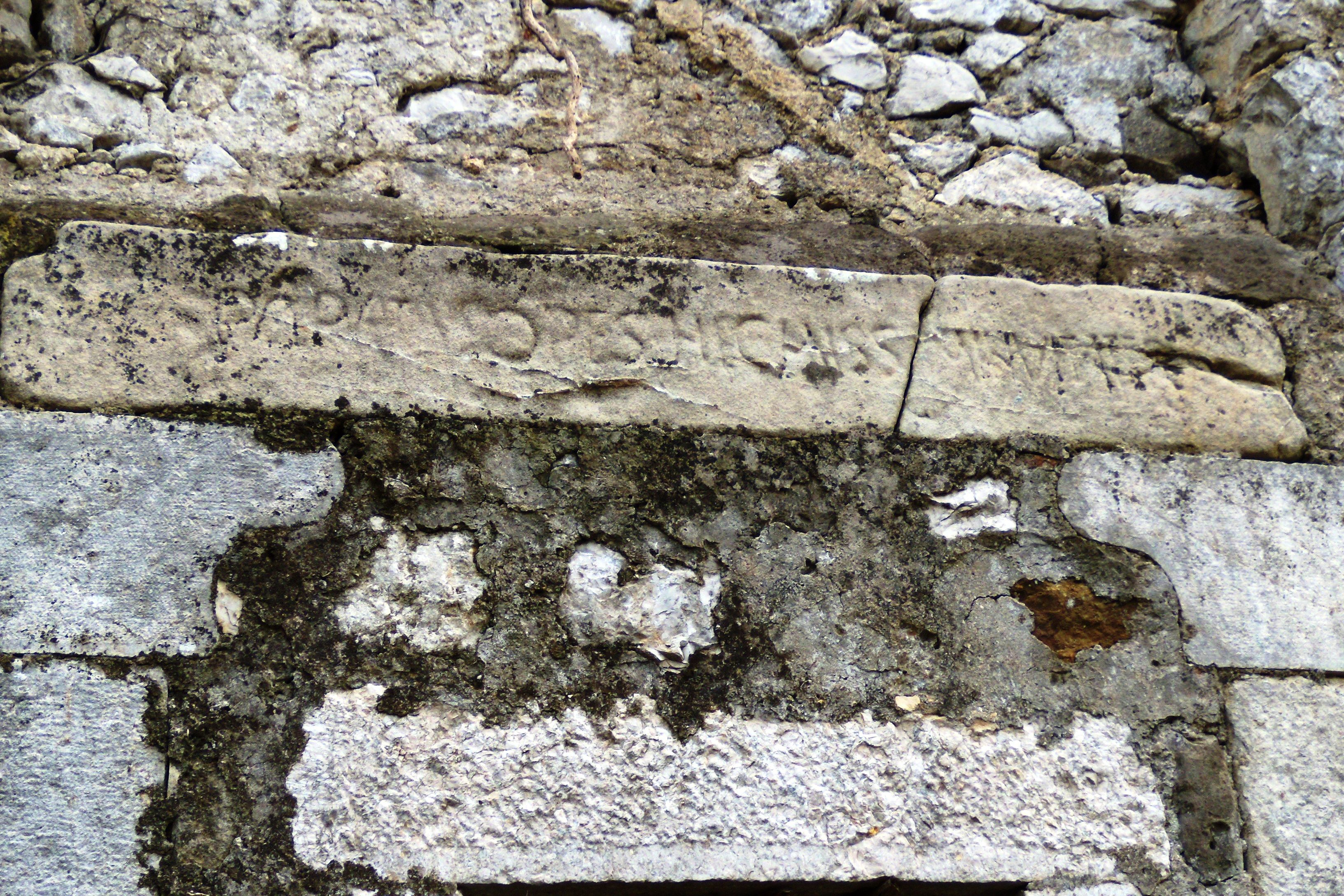
Epigraph in Latin located on a country cottage in the locality of "Santella" (Madonna del Carmine) in Cerreto Sannita, which originally belonged to the Magnati family. The epigraph, which reads "PARATAS OPES HIC MISAS MINUIT ITER," was placed in 1653 by the wealthy wool cloth merchant Antonio Magnati, brother of Deacon Francesco Magnati, who was killed in 1650 at the behest of Count Diomede V Carafa. The epigraph, whose text refers to the interrupted construction of the building, was placed to remind future generations that in order to avenge the death of Francesco Magnati, his brother Antonio spared no expense.

Msgr. Eugenio Cattaneo's tenure as bishop began in 1606 during a murky period in the history of the diocese. On August 3, 1606, Canon Don Giovan Pietro Palmisano was killed, guilty only of having been the key witness in a trial of Don Giovan Antonio De Cicco, accused of being the instigator of the murder of Girolamo de Hectore of Caiazzo, at the hands of bandits with whom he had periodic acquaintances. According to local historian Dr. Pescitelli, the bandits who had murdered the witness Palmisano also had as their objective the assassination of Msgr. Cattaneo, as can be deduced from a period document in which it is stated that "since the bishop also was in danger of his life, for some days there was fear for his life." The reason for this is to be found in the fact that, according to the "Menologium of the Barnabites," the newly appointed bishop worked immediately after his inauguration to reform the local clergy, which was largely corrupt.

The abuses of the feudal lords against their vassals, perpetrated by the thugs (guards in the service of the viceroy or feudal lord), were dramatically accentuated under the tenure of Diomede V Carafa, who had no qualms about torturing and killing people who dared to contradict him. Thus it was that when the physician Giovannangelo Lombardi was elected mayor of Maddaloni, having learned that Lombardi intended to appeal to the Sacred Royal Council against certain abuses, Count Diomede did not hesitate to kill Lombardi along with other of his companions.

The same fate befell Deacon Francesco Magnati of Cerreto. Magnati, who came from a wealthy family of wool cloth merchants, resented the abuse perpetrated against the poor. It was customary at the time for the count's thugs to draw up a list of peasants who had to compulsorily buy pigs at the price set by the feudal lord. One day the thugs came to a peasant and demanded that he purchase a five-month-old pig at the substantial sum of six ducats. The peasant rebelled both because he did not have the money to buy the pig and because he did not need it. A quarrel ensued that attracted neighbors including the deacon Francesco Magnati who, understanding the abuse that was being perpetrated against the peasant, came forward using harsh words against the feudal lord and giving the peasant the six ducats he owed to the thugs. The news was immediately reported by the guards to the viscount and, by the latter, to Count Diomede V Carafa, who instructed his henchman Giovanni Battista Carapella to kill Deacon Magnati. The murder is recounted in a note written by the notary Giulio Cesare Cappella: "Let the reader know the extraordinary event that happened to Deacon Francesco Magnati, an illustrious nobleman of the land of Cerreto: on the 20th of the month of October of the current year, while he was on his way, for his devotion, in the company of the cleric Sisto Mazzacane, Giovan Lorenzo Mammarella and a single servant, to the Capuchin church of S. Maria delle Grazie of the said land of Cerreto, at about the twenty-second hour, near the house built on the public street, in the vineyard of Vincenzo Mazzacane, having begun to ascend through the pavement leading to the aforesaid church of the Capuchins, he received in his body a shotgun blast with two lead balls, which struck his heart; and, although he should have died immediately, he was transported alive, by the grace of God, to the Capuchin church, in which, after two hours, having drawn up through him the will at the hands of Don Simone Mazzacane, and having received the last rites, he died [. ..]". The notary goes on to write that it was ascertained that the two gunshots were fired from the wall of the house adjacent to Mazzacane's vineyard and that "two subjects dressed in clerical garb had been seen, each with their faces covered, so that they could not be recognized."

The murder of Francesco Magnati did not go unpunished because Antonio Magnati, a wealthy cloth merchant and brother of the victim, did everything he could to avenge his brother's death before Justice, even going so far as to request an audience with King Philip IV of Spain. Appearing before the sovereign, he expounded the affair in great detail and showed the king and his wife his brother's bloody shirt with the holes of the two bullets. The sovereign, greatly impressed by the affair, instructed the viceroy of Naples to arrest Count Diomedes V, who was tried in Spain and sentenced to exile in Pamplona, where he died in 1660. The trip to Spain must have cost Antonio Magnati not a small amount since in 1653 he had an epigraph affixed to a country cottage whose construction had been interrupted so that subsequent generations would remember that he, in order to avenge the death of his brother Francis, spared no expense.

The death of Francesco Magnati served as a warning to those who dared to protest against the feudal lords. It was only several years after the death of Diomede V that other inhabitants of Cerreto sought to denounce the bullying of the Carafa counts, albeit less vigorously and directly than Magnati. In 1680 the bad customs of the feudal lords were the subject of mockery in the book Nobiltà in coppella, written by the Cerreto-born Pietro de Blasio, who railed against the hollowness and demeaning ignorance of the nobility.

The Universitas, despite the riches from the wool cloth industry and trade, weighed down in a dire financial situation and to cover the numerous taxes owed to the feudal lords and other extraordinary expenses it continually went into debt. The aforementioned deacon Francesco Magnati in 1623 lent the Universitas as much as 8,000 ducats, which were used to purchase large quantities of grain in Apulia because famine was about to kill many of the people of Cerreto. Francesco's uncle, Paolo Emilio Magnati, in 1617 had also lent the civic administration some 6,000 ducats to replenish the now-empty municipal coffers.

Among the largest extraordinary expenditures were those pertaining to the food and lodging of troops stopping in the town. According to the norm in force at the time, troops on their way to battles had to be housed and foraged on the way at the expense of the Universitas. The commander of the troops each time had to issue a kind of receipt attesting to the hospitality provided by the civic administration. That receipt could be presented to the Royal Court to obtain at least partial reimbursement for the expenses incurred. Very often, however, it happened that commanders refused to hand over the receipt, thus making the possibility of receiving reimbursement for expenses incurred vanish. In a notarial deed of 1607, the elected members of the Universitas of Cerreto complained that infantry captain Decio Scognamiglio had refused to hand over the receipt, thus causing serious damage to the municipal coffers since the soldiers had been housed at the expense of the community for more than a month.

A similar event occurred in 1633 when as many as two hundred and fifty soldiers lodged in Cerreto and despite the fact that the appropriate receipt had been presented, the Royal Court refused reimbursement asserting the urgency of the moment since the troops who had stopped in Cerreto were headed to Milan for a war moved against the Spanish. A few years later, in 1638, the elected officials declared that the civic administration owed many hundreds of ducats to the feudal treasury and therefore asked the viceroy of the time for permission to increase the duty on flour.

=== The earthquake of June 5, 1688 ===
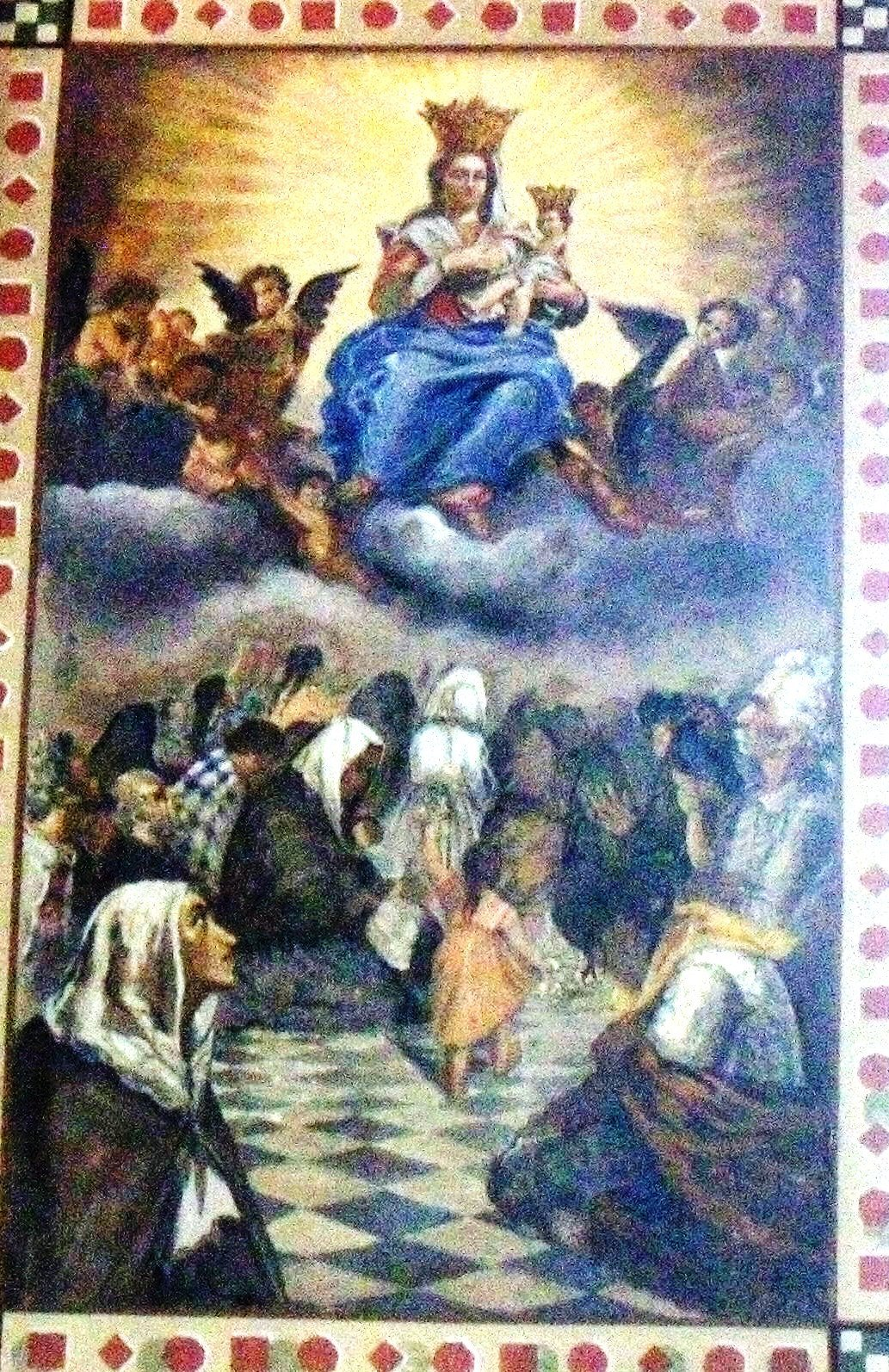
Cerretese survivors of the June 5, 1688 earthquake invoke Our Lady of Grace. Fresco located in the chapel of the Shrine of Our Lady of Grace.

Around 6:30 p.m. on June 5, 1688, a strong earthquake, classified between the 10th and 11th degree of the Mercalli Scale, razed Cerreto and most of the towns of Sannio to the ground. The bishop of the time, Giovanni Battista de Bellis, in a report written on June 11, 1688, and addressed to the Dicastery for Bishops, expressed himself thus: "I am forced with tears to give notice to Your Excellency of the horrendous spectacle of the desolation of the whole of this Diocese of mine, because of the earthquake that occurred at five o'clock of the current eve of Pentecost, while I remained to mourn the miseries of myself and of this People of mine. [...] Telese from ancient times was abandoned, and my predecessors the Bishops transferred their habitation to the Land of Cerreto, already numerous in Population, and distinguished where also a Church was built, very beautiful, and to this Church the service of the Cathedral was transferred, where the Canons officiated, fifteen in number. In this Land of Cerreto there was still the Church of St. Martin, Parish and Collegiate, with eleven Canons and the Archpriest. There was a Convent of Conventual Friars, a distinguished place of study, a Convent of Capuchin Friars, and another of Nuns of the Order of St. Clare, where there were sixty-five nuns and lay sisters. Now this Land with the Churches, Monasteries, and everything, collapsed all, without there remaining standing even a house to be desolated, which whoever does not see it, finds it hard to believe."

An eyewitness, Vincenzo Magnati, described the event as follows: "Head of the County (Cerreto), in which there were a little less than 8,000 inhabitants, half of them ended up buried in that massacre, and on that same day precisely June 5, in feeling and sensing the first tremor of the Earth they took it almost as a joke and a jest, in the second we thought it should stop and in the third we shouted: it is already no mockery, and in fleeing they were all crushed by the stones and buried by them thus finding death and the burial having fallen all without knowing a vestige of it, observing only a great heap badly composed of stones, limestone, beams and other materials, showing that there had been in it buildings and factories [. ...] The buildings were observed to bend and struggle from the foundations, and violently shake [...] the waters in some places, having lost their natural clarity, withdrew from their sources [...]." Another witness to the tragedy, a nun from the Poor Clare Monastery of Cerreto, expressed herself thus: "In the year of our Lord 1688 on June 5 at twenty o'clock (Note: In 1688, canonical time was in force so 8 p.m. then corresponds to about 6:30 p.m. today.) on the Saturday of Pentecost [... ] at the time that we found ourselves singing solemn vespers, in intoning the first psalm of vespers there was the first tremor, in which we saw all of us dead, however the Mother Abbess Sister Giuditta Mazzacane gave place of silence, and we continued with the vespers, in the Benedicamus domino the earthquake was so terrible, that we were all buried alive in the said Choir, of which there remained forty nuns alive with the Abbess Sister Giuditta Mazzacane still alive [. ..]".

Houses fell on top of each other and the destruction was total. The survivors poured into the surrounding countryside and into the area where the present town stands. On June 6, the day after the earthquake, Bishop Giovanni Battista de Bellis (who was visiting Faicchio when the earthquake occurred) came on foot to Cerreto, finding only destruction and desolation there. He took care to gather the surviving cloistered nuns, who were terrified and bewildered, and to seek better accommodation for them. Having found a house where they could be housed, the bishop wrote that as of July 16 it had not yet been possible to move the nuns because he had found no one to help him escort them since the survivors were intent, either on pitying their misfortunes, or on trying to unearth from the rubble some of the furnishings and savings they had kept.

The Cerreto-born poet Giovan Lorenzo Dalio in his elegy entitled "The Fall of Cerreto for the Earthquake" minutely described what happened during and after the earthquake. At first there was a loud roar, then large stones fell from the surrounding mountains. Some fled aimlessly; others, in panic, stood still, thus being killed. Houses, churches and buildings collapsed one after another, and a dark, thick cloud of dust suffocated breath and blurred vision. As the cloud cleared, a horrendous sight appeared to the survivors: rubble and blood everywhere, wounded and maimed, so many dead. Soon after the earthquake, while most mourned the death of a relative or friend, the thefts, looting and fights began.

In another report by Msgr. de Bellis, the climate of uncertainty and resignation that reigned in the days following the disastrous event was even more evident. The bishop wrote that all these "[...] poor people left without churches, without homes and without furnishings [...] lived miserably in the countryside without hope not only of having a covered place where they could shelter this winter, but without having any way to preserve this year's meager harvest." Thus there was a lack of food, and both mills and ovens, having collapsed, could not be used. Exacerbating the situation were "very thick rains," according to what the bishop notes in a letter dated June 19, 1688.

As soon as news of the disaster reached Naples, where the feudal lords were residing, Count Marzio Carafa promptly made sure that a large quantity of bread, several doctors and various medicines arrived in Cerreto to alleviate the suffering of the survivors. Along with the doctors, food and provisions, Marino Carafa, the count's brother and future governor of the State of the Presidi in Tuscany, also arrived in the town. Confirming this is a deed by the Cerreto-born notary Nicola Mastrobuoni, in which it is written that in "In such a massacre Mr. Don Marino Carafa, brother of His Excellency Duke Marzio, immediately took himself to said Cerreto, and thought of building in another place the dwelling of the few remaining Citizens."

In that moment of great confusion and despair Marino Carafa managed promptly and with cold blood the relief efforts addressed to the survivors and worked to dig in the rubble in order to find other people still alive. Vincenzo Magnati in his work Notitie istoriche de' terremoti thus describes the work of Marino Carafa: "Many women who had remained buried for several days with their children, who were feeding on milk, were also dug out alive from among those ruins by the piety of the Major of Battle of the County of Catalonia in the Kingdom of Aragon D. Marino Carafa, restrained perhaps by Divine disposition, having been destined to the relief of the County, and of those afflicted peoples, viewing their injuries with a fatherly eye, providing for their needs with inexplicable charity and love."

In addition to Magnati's numerous other testimonies of people found still alive under the rubble: nine days after the earthquake a young man was unearthed who had survived by drinking the wine he had in his cellar; after twelve days a woman was unearthed who said she had not felt the need to eat; after thirteen days a thirteen-year-old boy was unearthed who told of being assisted by Our Lady who had asked him to become a friar. After thirteen days young Giuseppe Ciaburri, nephew of the baron of Ginestra degli Schiavoni, was found in a void created among the piles of rubble. Ciaburri, who was found lying on several corpses, was saved thanks to the care of physician Gian Domenico d'Addona and told that he had always been aware that he had been the victim of an earthquake but believed that he had been buried for only three days and not thirteen, because he had slept a lot.

Historians agree that about half of the people of Cerreto died under the rubble but disagree on the quantification of this half and the number of inhabitants prior to the earthquake. According to Magnati, an eyewitness, and a notarial deed of 1744, the inhabitants of Cerreto in 1688 numbered eight thousand and the victims of the earthquake were about four thousand, a figure confirmed by the book of the dead of the collegiate church of S. Martino where it is written that more than three thousand inhabitants died. According to Pescitelli the inhabitants before the earthquake were four thousand two hundred and the victims were about two thousand. This thesis, however, contrasts with the testimony of Magnati and the reports of the bishops who noted that following the plague of 1656 the inhabitants of Cerreto were about eight thousand.

=== Reconstruction ===
Count Marzio Carafa and his brother Marino Carafa stopped those who intended to rebuild their houses on the rubble of the destroyed town and, with the advice of more expert engineers, decided to rebuild the town further down the valley and on more stable ground. The area chosen to build the new Cerreto was a vast, squat hill lapped to the east and west by the Turio and Cappuccini streams and crossed from north to south by the ancient Via Telesina, which connected ancient Cerreto to Telesia.

The reasons for this choice, according to local historian Vincenzo Mazzacane, would not stem from a far-sighted gesture of the feudal lord towards his subjects, but instead from economic convenience given that the taxes alone derived from the wool cloth industry directly provided the Carafa counts with more than 10000 ducats a year, equal to about three million euros today. The Carafa's decision to rebuild the town on a different site from the previous one did not arouse the approval of the survivors given that a notarial deed of the time reveals that some of the people of Cerreto "were forced even by the Prisons to take their residence elsewhere."

The building of the new town was begun immediately after the squaring of the blocks, which was done by the royal engineer Giovanni Battista Manni, who also had the task of assessing the rents of the land occupied. The land where the new Cerreto arose was owned by several families who were obliged to sell it to the citizens who were to build their houses according to the rents assessed by Manni. So it was that, having drawn the insulas and assessed the land occupied, "in the same year that the earthquake happened [...] all, and each of said Citizens, took, and designated their dwelling [...] the Plants, which were to serve for the use of building houses, gardens and vegetable gardens; and in fact each Citizen began, and without interruption continued the constructions of his own house in the chosen and designated place."

The new Cerreto was built on privately owned land that was under cultivation or was often uncultivated and full of brambles or stones. The largest piece of land was that of Baron Pietro Petronzi, which extended sixty almuds but was declared to have little income. On this land was built the collegiate church of San Martino and the monastery of the convent fathers of St. Anthony. It was followed in size by the land of Dr. Paolo Emilio Magnati, which was partly used as an olive grove and on which the church of Santa Maria and Palazzo Nardella were built. Other soils of lesser size were those of the Universitas (where the monastery of the Poor Clares was built), Margherita Carapella (where the Ungaro palace was built) and the Russo family (at the beginning of today's Corso Umberto). Between Via Telesina and the Cappuccini stream were plots owned by the Amato, Grillo and Reverend Domenico Giamei; the latter land was full of stones and was very steep because of the proximity of the stream. Small portions of land belonged to the churches of San Martino and Sant'Onofrio while the land on which the Cathedral was built was owned by Alfonso Gennarelli.

Count Marzio Carafa, in order to encourage reconstruction, issued several measures. First, since many people of Cerreto had lost all their possessions under the rubble and in order not to see them suffer in the countryside, he obtained a loan of no less than 3,000 ducats from the local Monte di Pietà, and with this money he had small houses of one or two rooms built, which he sold for a sum ranging from 50 to 184 ducats, which could be paid comfortably within four years with interest of 6 percent. The count also authorized his tax collector to grant to all those citizens of Cerreto who requested it, the sums of money they wanted. These sums, granted without any interest, were to be returned to the collector within three years under penalty of the 6% interest. Finally it was stipulated that those who had occupied land for building purposes, if they did not build on it immediately had to give it to other people who had an interest in building. Local historian Renato Pescitelli, while emphasizing the extraordinary sensitivity of the Carafa family toward their subjects, does not fail to point out that these measures had a "zero cost" for the feudal coffers since both the sums paid for housing and those given by the tax collectors to needy citizens were repaid by 1712.

Only eight years after the earthquake every citizen had built his own house. The bishop of the time Msgr. Biagio Gambaro wrote on December 22, 1696 that "[...] every citizen has built his own house and the city has been rebuilt with such order and in such a short time that the neighbors have had to admire and marvel at it [...]." The need to employ funds and labor in the building of houses and wool cloth industries caused the completion of religious architecture to slip, the construction sites of which lasted in some cases until the middle of the 18th century.

=== Economy and society after 1688 ===
==== Ceramics and other economic activities ====
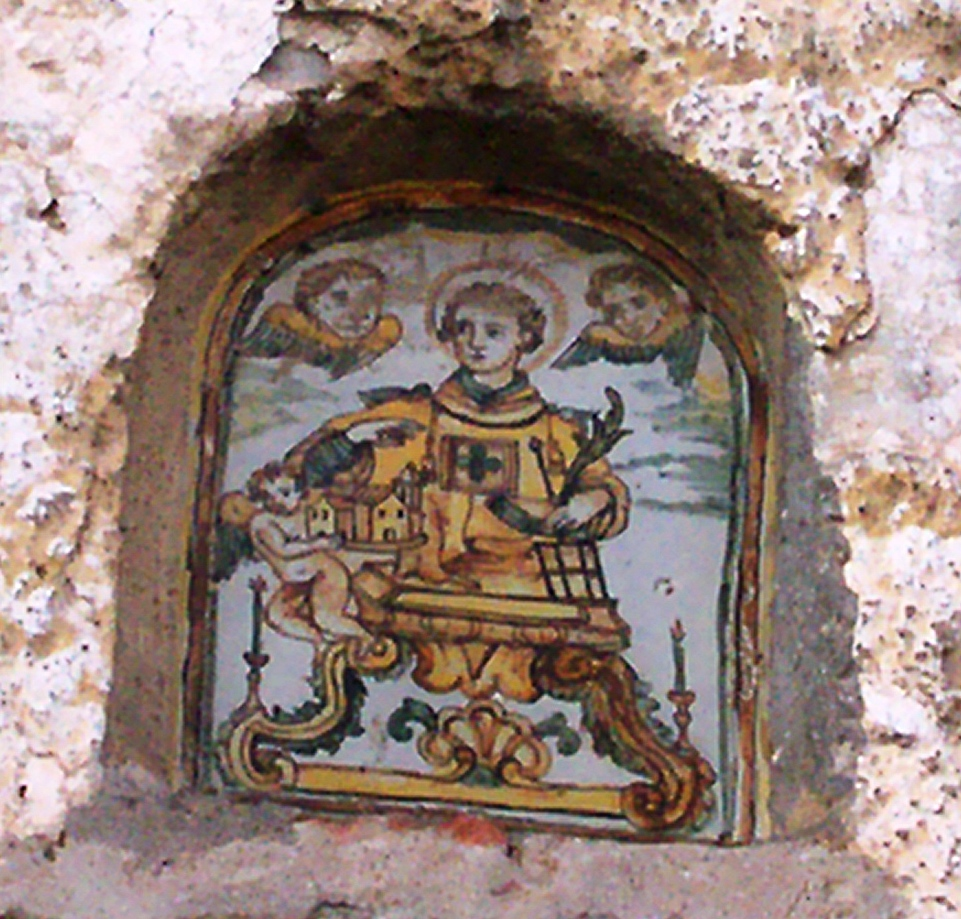
Cerretese ceramic aedicule depicting St. Lawrence the Martyr (18th century). The aedicule is located on the facade of a former potters' workshop in the "Insula dei faenzari," the potters' quarter that was located near the Cathedral.

With the reconstruction of the town, numerous artisans, especially Neapolitans, arrived in Cerreto, including several ceramists who contributed to the rebirth of ceramics in Cerreto. The coming of these workers was facilitated by a provision of the 1541 Statutes that exempted outsiders settling in the town from paying various taxes.

In the "new" Cerreto there was a real potters' quarter located near the Cathedral. During the renovation of several dwellings located in that area, remains of kilns for firing terracotta and ceramics were found. In this "insula dei faenzari" were the workshops of Francesco Iadomaso, from Cerreto, and Carlo Coluccio, from Campobasso. In the same area stood the workshop of Nicolò Russo, a master ceramist who moved from Naples in 1693. In his workshop worked many young apprentices who during the 18th century became the main exponents of Cerretese ceramics: Domenico Marchitto, Santi Festa, Melchiorre Cerri, Nicola and Crescenzo Petruccio, Nicola Marchitto, Salvatore Paduano, and Giuseppe Paolino. Russo executed numerous works in Cerreto Sannita including several floorings in religious architecture.

In the early eighteenth century the county governor Migliorini thus described in a poem the area where Cerretese potters worked:

Poco d'ivi lontano (dalla Cattedrale) è la Faenza
Cioè dove si fanno i vasi bianchi
E dipinti con somma diligenza
Voi vedrete lavor sì fini e franchi
Che se fosser di creta di Savoia
Potrian star d'ogni lavoro ai fianchi.
Orsù passiamo innanzi alle fornaci
E lor botteghe, ove si fan la creta
Che sono d'ogni lode, in ver, capaci.
Tant'è ver che se in Napoli volete
Un cantar, verbigrazia, o un orinale,
come li sanno far qua, nol troverete.
"Little far away (from the Cathedral) is the Faenza
That is, where white vases are made
And painted with supreme diligence
You will see work so fine and frank
That if they were of Savoy clay
They could stand of every work at the sides.
Now let us pass before the kilns
And their workshops, where they make clay
Which are of all praise, in truth, skilled.
So true is it that if in Naples you want
A chamber pot, for example, or a stool,
As they know how to make them here, you will not find it."

In 1733 in one of his reports Bishop Francesco Baccari expressed himself thus: "[...] the Seminary and the Bishop's Palace is already completed, and at present the Cathedral Church is being built, which perfecting itself, in a few years, as it is hoped, will not be inferior to any other Cathedral Church of the nearby Dioceses. Cerreto is a city of four thousand, and more souls, in addition to the Cathedral there is also a distinguished Collegiate Church with eleven canons, and an archpriest, [...] the Clergy is numerous of about one hundred ecclesiastics, including the Canons of the two Chapters and the Clerics. There are the two convents of St. Francis and the Capuchins; a Cloistered Monastery with sixty nuns, and several other Churches; the Doctors of Law; the Professors of Medicine and the Apothecaries are many. Its territory is fertile, while it gives over twenty thousand barrels of wine every year [...] it practically gives enough grain, and other edibles. Some peculiar cloths are manufactured there [...] there is no lack of all sorts of arts." The bishop continued his report by writing that the industry and trade in woollen cloth annually yielded more than sixty thousand scudi and that the exorbitant sum of one million ducats, or about two hundred million euros, had been spent on the exorbitant reconstruction of the town from scratch.

In 1742, thanks to King Charles of Bourbon's introduction of the land register, a better picture of the economic situation in Cerreto was perceived. In that year in Cerreto there were one hundred and thirty-six wool-carders, twenty-five shearers, three cloth dyers, three hundred and thirty laborers or hoesmen, and sixty-six shepherds who revolved around the local wool cloth industry. Then among those who ran workshops were five barbers, a hoop maker, four rope makers, nineteen carpenters, thirty-three blacksmiths, a gilder, a master of making scissors for unlearning cloth, one of making combs and another of making sieves for sorting flour, two farriers, twenty-two tailors, eight stone masons and two painters. Linked to the manufacture of ceramics, however, were four ceramists. Also belonging to the world of culture were two land surveyors, two scribes, three judges to contracts, a musician, seven notaries, three medical apothecaries, twenty-eight doctors in laws and eight physicists. Finally, there were forty-three members of the secular clergy, thirteen priest friars, eight priests, twenty-five clerics, forty-five nuns, and fifty-one students, some of them university students.

Gradually, and beginning in the mid-18th century, the woollen cloth industry began its slow decline both because of the meager resources invested in it, which were needed for the reconstruction of the town, and because of growing competition from northern industries, as well as the gradual weakening of the Cerretese merchant class, plagued by centuries of injustice and constant disputes with feudal lords.

==== Universitas and feudal lords in the 18th century ====
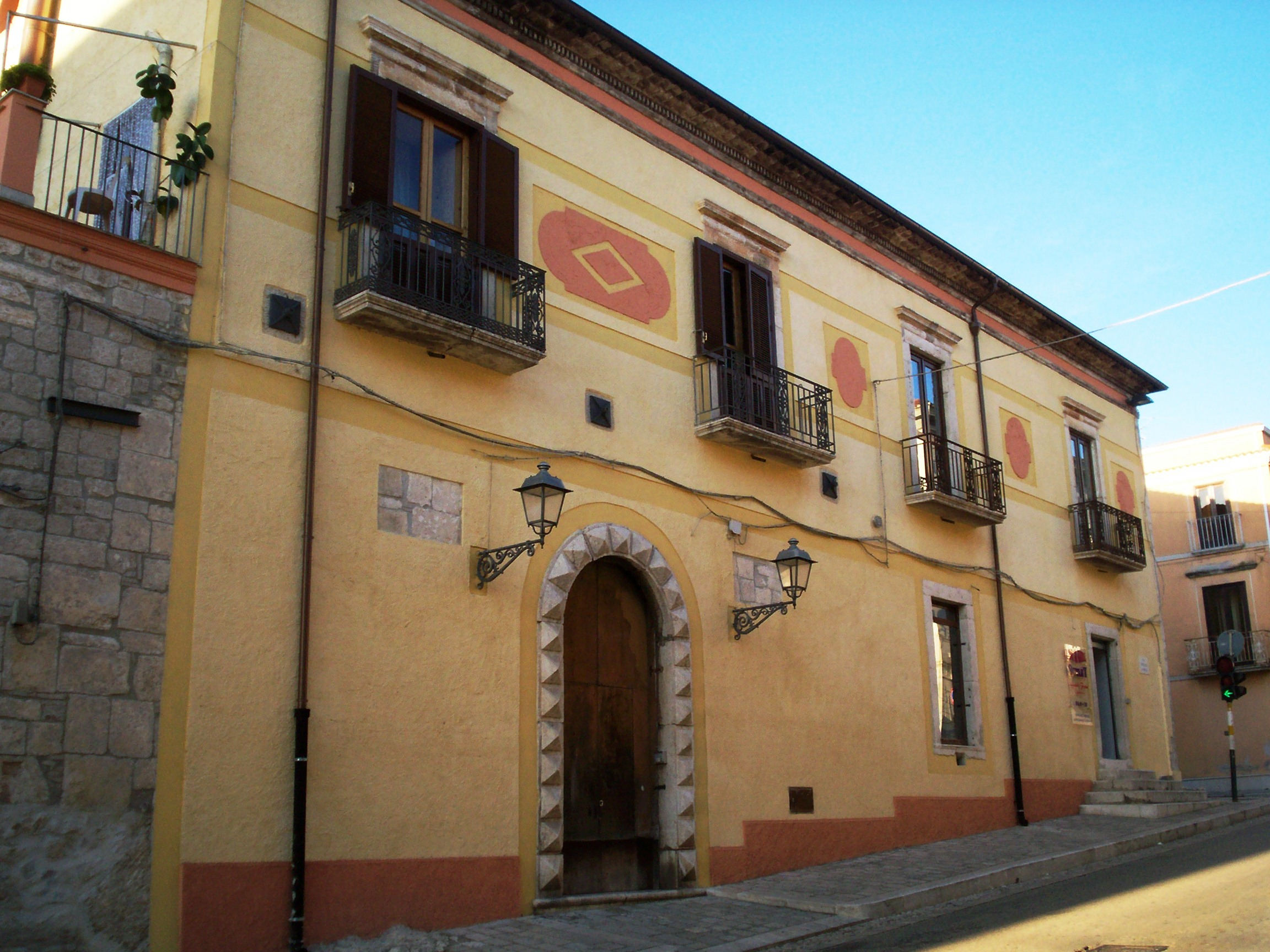
The viscount's palace where the county governors appointed by the Carafa family and who looked after the interests of the feudal lords lived and gave hearings. From this palace in 1737 the viscount Tommaso Casselli gave orders to arrest several inhabitants of Cerreto in order to block the submission of some complaints to the Sacred Royal Council.

The financial situation of the Universitas was getting worse and worse. In addition to the tax on fires (households) the civic administration was burdened with several other annual burdens such as: 150 ducats to the feudal lord as a Christmas gift; 600 ducats for the reserved chamber (for the exercise of civil and criminal justice); 750 ducats for the mint of weights and measures and for the right of way; 180 ducats to the county treasury (tax collector); 255 ducats to the henchmen (police squad); 83 ducats to those whom the count assigned to stamp or register wool cloths produced in Cerreto; 24 ducats for ius staterae; 50 ducats for the civil actuaries. Then there were the 1,000 ducats required to confirm the 1541 Statutes and the numerous indirect duties on the wool cloth industry and foodstuffs. In addition to these ordinary expenditures, the Universitas was continually faced with numerous extraordinary expenses.

In 1737 the Universitas, burdened by several past debts and tired of having to pay innumerable feudal taxes and fees, filed a new lawsuit against the Carafa counts with the Sacred Royal Council, presenting thirty-five counts of gravamen concerning mainly the exorbitant donations granted to the feudal lords, the viscount and his protégés, arbitrary imprisonments, and taxes on woollen cloth. In response the feudal lords sent one hundred and twenty soldiers who, led by the viscount Casselli, burst in during an assembly of citizens, arresting and punishing many of the participants. All but the few who supported the Carafa, in a panic, took refuge in churches and convents. The most educated people were indicted with the intention of having the quarrel withdrawn. For forty days no one went out into the streets and no one worked until King Charles III, impressed by some pleas, ordered the Royal Chamber of the Summary to see if there had been any use of justice, and the same Court promptly provided by recalling the records and ordering the release of the prisoners.

The submission of the complaint to the Sacred Royal Council had alarmed the count and the governor, who tried in every way, even by force, to convince the citizens to withdraw the complaint. Viscount Casselli hired thugs who went around the city with the aim of reaping terror and punishing the elected members of the Universitas. The episodes of violence were manifold: the messenger bringing news from the court in Naples was slapped and clubbed; on June 16 three shopkeepers were severely and unprovokedly beaten; on June 26 another Cerretese was assaulted and beaten with goblets and fists; in July another citizen was beaten to a pulp in the square; in the following months other Cerretese were seriously injured. Viceconte Casselli, the architect of so much violence, dismissed the lawsuits, and in order to defame the most important Cerretese families of the time he gave to the press a pamphlet in which he wrote that as many as thirty-two Cerretese families were composed of gamblers, adulterers, usurers, idolaters, thieves, swindlers, incestuous, forgers and cuckolds. But the violence did not stop only at the beating: in order to strike a blow to the honor of one of the families that had supported the appeal to the Royal Council, Viscount Casselli ordered a public verification of young Carminia Landolfo's state of virginity.

The case before the Sacred Royal Council, which began in 1738, delivered quite a few successes to the people of Cerreto, who were able, albeit partially, to redeem themselves from centuries of feudal injustice and abuse. The court declared that payments for the "reserved chamber" were not due, and the count was not only ordered to return the reserved chamber rights, but was also ordered to pay the "bonatenenza," a kind of land tax on feudal property. Christmas gifts and undue entitlements owed to the governor and his aides were also suppressed. The most important success the civic administration achieved was to abolish the regulations that stipulated that the people of Cerreto were forced to grind grain in the mills of the feudal lords and to purchase any goods from the feudal lords, thus achieving a liberalization of trade and industry.

The municipal debt continued to rise from 4,395 ducats in the mid-eighteenth century to 11,796 in 1782. Affecting the budgets were extraordinary expenses such as fees due to Neapolitan attorneys to support the judgments before the Sacred Royal Council, expenses to cope with the plague and famine of 1764, and, finally, salaries for the gendarmes who were charged with watching to ensure that thefts and raids by thugs, which were the order of the day in the second half of the 18th century, were avoided.

Raids were often carried out by bands of Albanians on horseback as happened on the afternoon of August 7, 1774. That day some Albanians on horseback headed for the store of Giuseppe Capuano who was the contractor for the sale of royal tobacco. Finding Capuano, the Albanians pinned him down and, firing bayonet shots, hurriedly drove those on the street back into their homes. Even Bishop Filiberto Pascale, who was taking a walk along the street, was forcibly pulled into a house to prevent the Albanians from harming him. The gang headed with Capuano to the Shrine of Our Lady of Grace where, encamped in the space in front of the religious complex, they tortured Capuano. It was only through the mediation of the Capuchin friars that an agreement was reached whereby Capuano, being freed, was obliged to buy a large quantity of contraband tobacco supplied by the Albanians themselves.

== Contemporary age ==
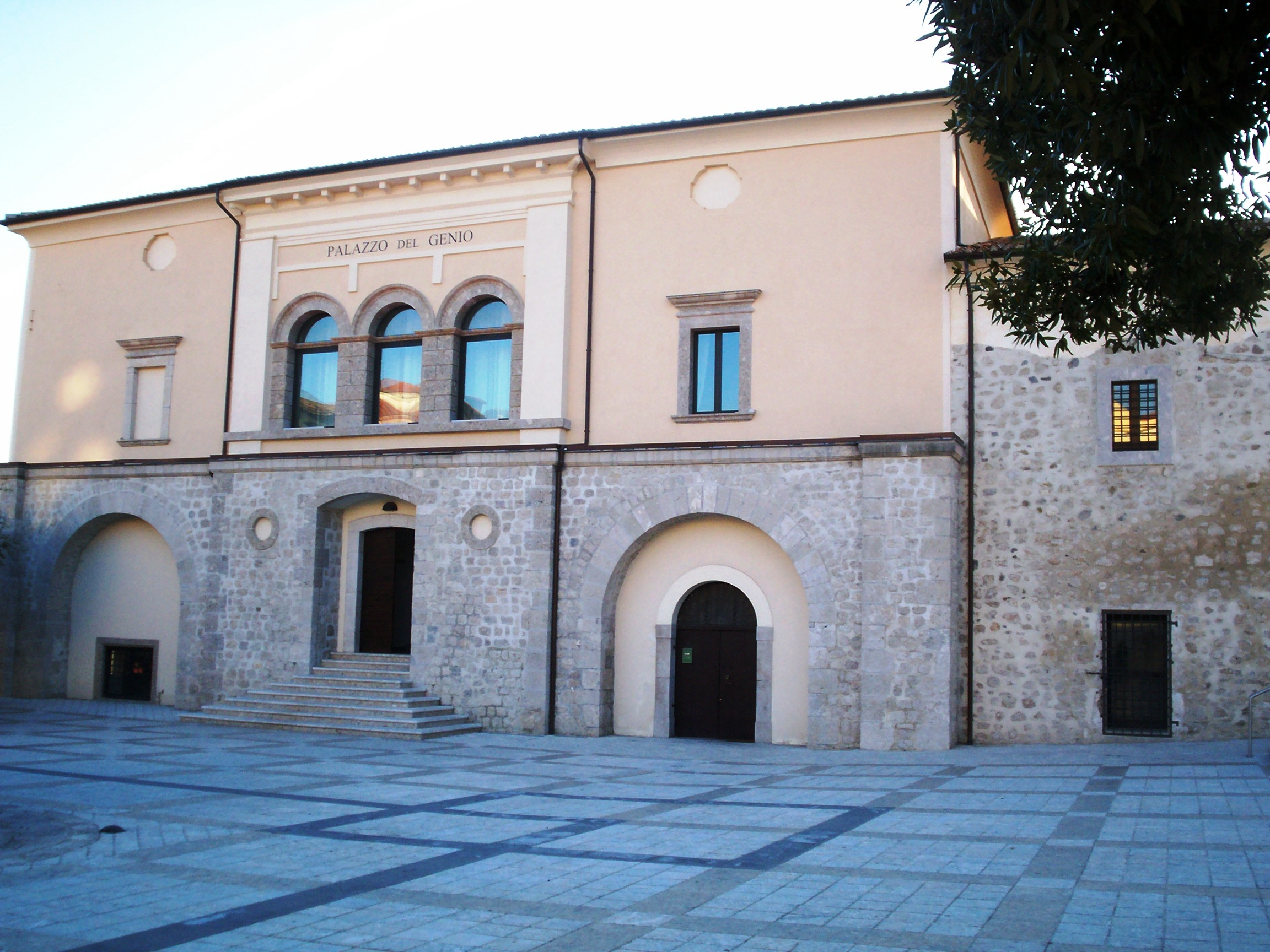
The Teatro del Genio, active as early as 1737 and remodeled in style in 1810; censorship did not allow the performance there of the opera "Cerreto modernata," a satire of the Cerreto clergy in the 18th century.

=== French rule ===
In 1799, when Napoleonic troops arrived in nearby Solopaca, some Cerretese went there on January 15. There Brigadier General Dufrese, in the name of General Jean Étienne Championnet, appointed three citizens to govern the commune and "to tell the people the truth, to reassure the good, to give courage to the timid and to guard against the wicked." The appointment license added that the French acknowledged the respect due to property, people and religion, ordering all Cerretese to recognize citizens Giovanni Di Lella, Gregorio Mastracchio and Giuseppe Mazzacane as their magistrates and to give them respectful obedience.

Once the Parthenopean Republic was proclaimed, various demonstrations of attachment to the new republican institutions continued, culminating in the creation of the liberty tree. The brief interlude of the Parthenopean Republic was closed shortly afterwards by the French, who, following the creation of the Kingdom of Naples, cut down the tree of liberty in the square.

It was under French rule, and especially with the reign of Joachim Murat, that several important reforms were implemented that also benefited Cerreto such as the establishment of compulsory elementary school, the abolition of feudalism, and the creation of the Decurionates that replaced the obsolete Universitas. Following the establishment of compulsory elementary school, the Cerreto Decurionate elected Reverend Michele Marchitto as teacher for boys and Mrs. Caterina Mazzarelli as teacher for girls.

Contextually, there was no lack of raids and abuses carried out by the French armies. Churches and convents were sacked, the Cathedral and Seminary were occupied by the Napoleonic army, and the ancient monastery of the Conventual fathers of St. Anthony was suppressed. A memoir by Baron Carizzi of Cerreto reads, "February 1806. The French came again to Cerreto (about three thousand cavalry and infantry, as it was said) [...] and to prevent plunder a gratuity of ducats 1,260 had to be made to the general, and on the morning of the 15th they left for Benevento. On the evening of the 15th another three hundred came. My installment of contribution was 23 ducats."

On July 26, 1805, the feast day of St. Anne, a new earthquake struck Cerreto causing some damage to the lower part of the historic center and to religious architecture. From Baron Carizzi's aforementioned memoir we read, "On Monday, July 26, 1805, the day of St. Anne, after two o'clock at night, there was a horrible tremor of an earthquake that ruined many houses in lower Cerreto, with the death of seven people. All the houses suffered, some more and some less. The churches especially have suffered a lot: the Cathedral, S. Antonio, the Congregation of Constantinople [...] S. Martino should have suffered a lot of damage, but it was attributed to a miracle of Our Lady of Grace, who was exposed since July 13, and who surely saved Cerreto from the last massacre." One of the Cathedral's two bell towers collapsed, the Seminary building was damaged, and the presbytery, transept and dome of St. Anthony's church collapsed, never to be rebuilt. The death toll was seven. Strangely enough, the earthquake struck more in the lower part of the town, causing very slight damage to the upper part.

Following the issuance of the decree of the subversion of feudality, the feudal commission was born, a collegial body established for the purpose of ruling on disputes concerning the division of state property and feudal lords' property. The ruling pertaining to the municipality of Cerreto was issued on July 5, 1809.

In 1807 the locality Massa was aggregated to the municipality as a "casale" (hamlet). In the resolution of the Decurionate of May 1, 1808, a person was appointed to "the municipal and rural cleaning of Massa, casale aggregated to this Universitas of Cerreto." In 1809-1810 Cerreto lost its historic hamlets of Civitella Licinio and San Lorenzello, which became autonomous municipalities.

=== Restoration ===
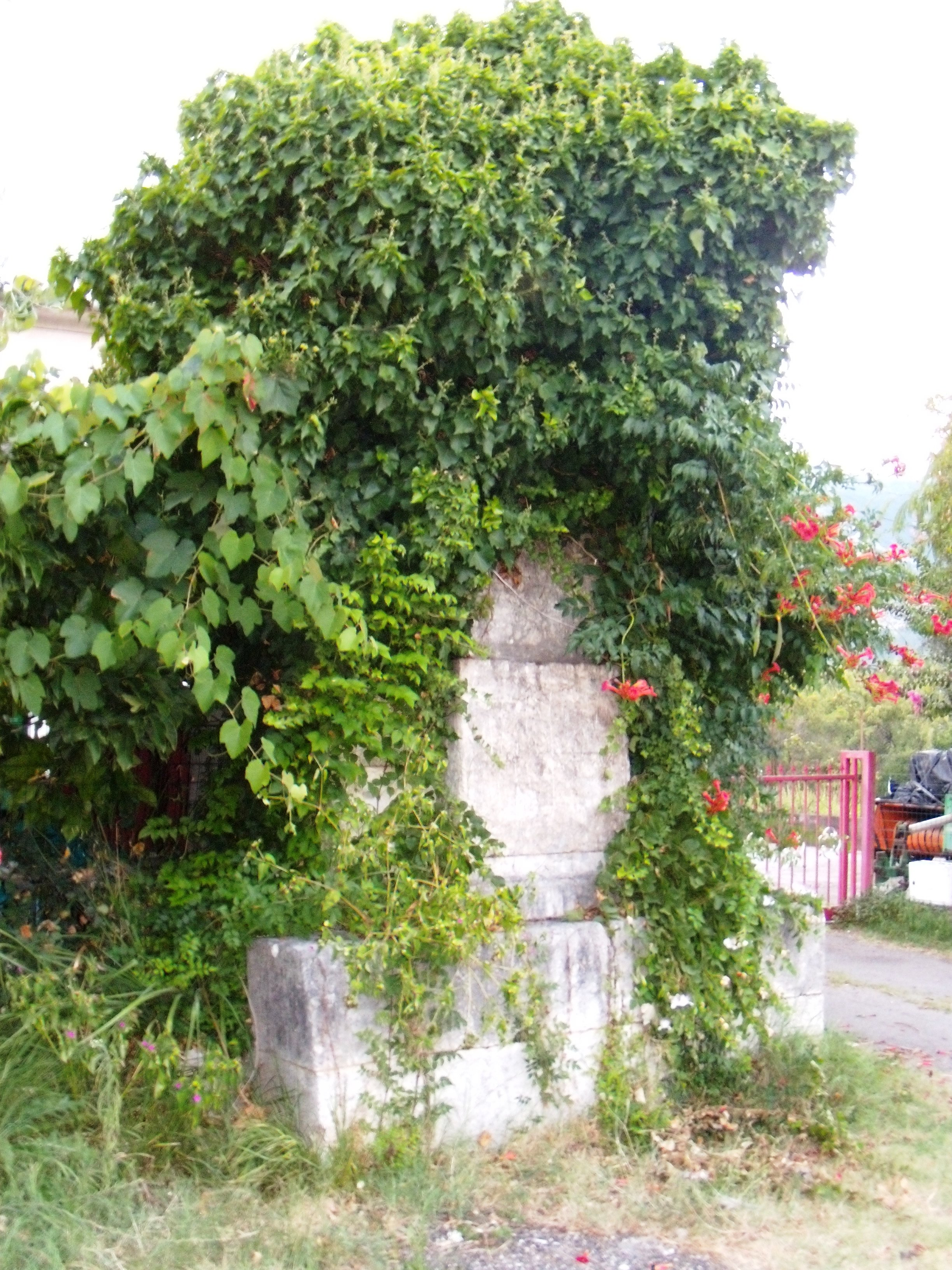
The epitaph to Ferdinand II of the Two Sicilies, erected to commemorate the sovereign's visit to these areas.

After Napoleon fell, fought and defeated Joachim Murat, Ferdinand IV of Naples returned to the throne, thus ending the decade of reforms and social changes that had swept through southern Italy.

In 1820 some uprisings forced the ruler Ferdinand I of the Two Sicilies to promise, on July 7, the Constitution. On Aug. 20 of the same year five delegates were elected, who, together with others designated by the surrounding municipalities, elected Dr. Pietro Paolo Perugini of San Lorenzello as deputy.

In 1848 new uprisings, similar to 1820, forced Ferdinand II to grant a constitutional charter on February 10. Precisely during those days a "freedom wagon," organized by the reactionary Giuseppe Mastracchio, traveled through Cerreto.

On June 15, Pasquale Ciabburri from Cerreto was elected deputy with 364 votes to Giulio Porto from Faicchio's 152, Mariano Piazza's 85 and Gaetano Del Giudice's 53. But in March 1849 the king violently ended the constitutional regime, reintroducing absolutism. On Dec. 19, 1849, Piedimonte's subintendent instructed town leader Tommaso Carizzi to strictly supervise a list of people from Cerreto suspected of plotting against the monarchy. Carizzi replied, however, that he had nothing to report on the account of the aforementioned.

On February 9, 1852 Ferdinand II arrived in Solopaca for the inauguration of the Maria Cristina Bridge over the Calore River. In the afternoon the King, accompanied by the Minister of the Interior, four senior officers and thirty mounted guards, stopped without warning in Cerreto, heading for the Cathedral. Local historian Nicola Rotondi describes the event as follows:

Only the Sacristans were here at that hour [...] One of them nevertheless ran quickly to the nearby Seminary to warn the Rector Mr. Theologian Nicola Ciaburri, who first judged him to be a dreamer [...]; whereupon he came immediately down to the Church, as he had been told, amidst amazement, he found there the august Sovereign, who was gazing at him with complacency. A most joyful pealing began immediately, and also incontinently discoursed through the city the fame of it, ever increasing. Of every age therefore, of every condition and rank drew down the forgetful people, and in such a crowd, that the Cathedral was filled with them at once, and shortly afterwards also the Square.

The august Sovereign then went to the seminary, visiting it entirely and allowing the seminarians to kiss his hand. He then looked out of a window of the building facing the square, listening to the "hurrahs" of a festive crowd (due in part to the news that he had given 100 ducats to be distributed to the poor).

The local clergy took the opportunity of Ferdinand II's visit to denounce to him the difficult situation in which the diocese found itself, having had no bishops from 1800 to 1818 and having subsequently been united with that of Alife, which was newer and smaller than that of Cerreto. On July 6, 1852, Pope Pius IX, at the instance of our dearest son in G. C. Ferdinand II, illustrious King of the Kingdom of the Two Sicilies, ordered the restoration of the bishop's chair in Cerreto.

The new bishop Msgr. Luigi Sodo was given the onerous task of rebuilding a diocese that had been suppressed for half a century. To the faithful who welcomed him at his entrance into the town on August 14, 1853, he said, "[...] But it pleased that God who is the arbiter of our life, in whose hands the fates of men are placed, to prolong my days, removing me from the scythe of death, and while I had resumed the cares of my ministry, unexpectedly I saw myself transferred to the regime of this illustrious Church, which by the deignation of the Roman Pontiff, at the instances of the most religious Our Sovereign [. ..] was being separated from that of Alife, and in its former luster and splendor reinstated."

=== The Kingdom of Italy ===
==== The years of brigandage ====
In 1860 Cerreto's liberals along with those from neighboring towns organized themselves into a provisional committee that sought arms and raised money to set up the Matese Legion, which on September 3, led by De Marco, entered Benevento proclaiming a provisional government there.

In the same year Cerreto was the protagonist of an attempted reaction on September 27 when some smugglers, encouraged by the rumor that royal troops were marching from Amorosi to San Salvatore Telesino, stormed the local National Guard station, arming themselves with the rifles and weapons there. Subsequently, the insurgents forced the band to follow them to the square in front of the Cathedral of Cerreto Sannita. Induced by Bishop Luigi Sodo to disperse, they found themselves in front of Giacinto Ciaburro's palace, which was stormed and looted shortly after the Ciaburro family fled via the garden. However, Bishop Sodo was accused of being the mastermind of the uprising and following the issuance of an arrest warrant he fled to Naples on November 7. He returned to the village on June 15, 1861, but had to flee again because he was suspected of aiding and abetting brigands.

By decree of October 25, 1860, signed on behalf of the dictator Garibaldi by General Giorgio Pallavicini, Benevento was erected into a province of the Kingdom. Subsequently and by a lieutenancy decree, on February 17, 1861, Cerreto was removed from the district of Piedimonte d'Alife and aggregated to the province of Benevento as district capital. The word "Sannita" was added to the town's name to distinguish it from other towns of the same name on the peninsula. The first president of the newly formed province of Benevento was the Cerretese Michele Ungaro.

As early as the last months of 1860 a large band of brigands, commanded by the Cerretese Cosimo Giordano, was inciting the local populations to revolt against the Piedmontese army. Thus in August 1861 important attempts at revolt occurred in the towns of Pontelandolfo (August 7–9) and Casalduni (August 11). But while in Pontelandolfo only a few murders of traitors and spies were committed at the hands of Giordano and his men, in Casalduni, on the other hand, the population slaughtered as many as forty soldiers, four carabinieri and an infantry lieutenant once taken prisoner. In response, on August 14 at dawn a battalion of five hundred soldiers commanded by Colonel Pier Eleonoro Negri, found vengeance on the blameless population of Pontelandolfo, indulging in heinous rapes and killings while the town was set on fire.

In the following years the fight against brigandage was intensified, and several circulars were issued in this direction by the subprefecture of Cerreto Sannita. Number 788, dated September 5, 1868, read, "The most illustrious Mr. General Pallavicini, superior commander of the troops united against brigandage, after permission from the Ministry of the Interior has put out a manifesto for which prizes are fixed that would be paid in gold to those who kill or cause to be presented the following brigand leaders: 12,000 Lire for Domenico Fusco, 3,000 Lire for Cosimo Giordano, Alessandro Pace, Domenico Fontana, Francesco Cedrone, and Giuseppe Campana. The Province also offers another L. 3,000 to those who bring Cosimo Giordano and Ludovico Vincenzo alias Pilucchiello to justice."

The bounties placed on the bandit leaders, Giordano's continued absences and the cooperation of the population began to undermine the band's unity. Cosimo Giordano continued killing, kidnapping people and stealing until his arrest in 1882. Put on trial, he was sentenced to hard labor for life.

==== Cerreto's Belle Époque and World War I ====
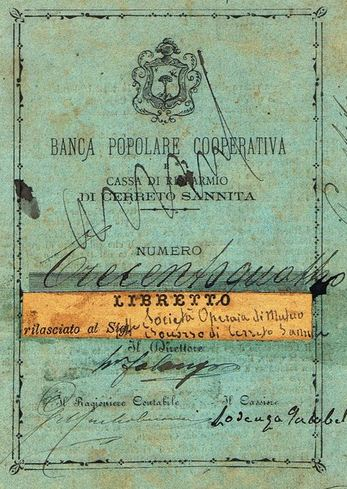
Title page of a savings booklet of the Cooperative People's Bank of Cerreto Sannita (which existed between 1889 and 1926) kept in the archives of the Workers' Society of Cerreto Sannita.

Once the years of revolts and brigandage had passed, Cerreto Sannita experienced a flourishing social and cultural development typical of the Belle Époque, a historical and cultural period that took place between the 19th and 20th centuries. A prominent Cerreto politician in the second half of the 19th century was Michele Ungaro, the first president of the province of Benevento, a member of Parliament and mayor of the town. In 1881 he founded the Workers' Society of Cerreto Sannita for the purpose of assisting Cerreto Sannita workers economically in case of need and to elevate their education through courses and trade classes.

Political life in the town was divided between two factions: the party above, headed by Giuseppe D'Andrea, deputy for five terms, president of the province of Benevento and from 1910 senator of the Kingdom, and the party below, clustered around Antonio Venditti, provincial councilor and deputy for three terms, respectively supporters of Sidney Sonnino and Giovanni Giolitti at the national level. Clashes between these two factions reached several times to actual brawls fueled by Venditti's supporters, who to the cry of "long live Venditti" occupied the voting room in 1902. D'Andrea complained about these events at the March 30, 1903 session of the Chamber of Deputies, obtaining from Giolitti the answer "On the elections in Cerreto [...] it is the customs that must be changed."

Despite political divisions, there was no shortage of several important initiatives that invested the town during that period. In 1891 the municipal aqueduct was entirely redone, in 1903 the cemetery was enlarged, and in 1908 the installation of the electric power line was completed, hailed by poet Pietro Paolo Fusco with an ode in Cerretese dialect that reads:

Come è beglie Cerrit agliumat / cu l'agliettrica ‘mezza a la via,/ pare addò agg fatt i suldat / e chiù beglie d' Napuglie sarria /…./ I agg ditte a muglierma, Carmela, / d'associarme all'illuminazione, / e m'ha ditte ca è meglie a cannela / pe paricchie e deverse ragione;/ ca i che saccio, dentra l'ogl s'ammolla i capigl e s'allecca le deta, / e si manca, s'arroste a braciola / ‘coppa a sciamma de gliume de creta …../ Patratè! Che ragione so cchesse / de muglierma?, che pozza arraggià! / song n'ome de scienze e prugresse, / teng i puezz, e ma oglio accattà.
How beautiful Cerreto is lit up with electricity in the middle of the street, it looks like where I was a soldier and it is more beautiful than Naples. I told my wife, Carmela, to hook me up to electricity, and she told me that the candle is better, for several different reasons: that, I don't know, in the oil you soften your hair and lick your fingers, and if there is no fire, you roast your chops over the flame of the clay lamp. But there it goes! What reasons are these, these of my wife? Let her be angry! I am a man of science and progress, I have money and I want to buy it.

A certain interest in the past and local history was also born. Priest Nicola Rotondi wrote the conspicuous historical memoirs of Cerreto Sannita, the first literary work to tell the history of the town from antiquity to the second half of the 19th century. Other writers such as lecturer Agostino di Lella, on the other hand, were interested in particular historical periods such as the Roman and early Christian ages. Some archaeological excavations were also conducted, leading to the discovery of a prehistoric settlement near Morgia Sant'Angelo.

The money from the many Cerretese who had emigrated to America greatly benefited those who remained to live in the town. With that money, homes were renovated and expanded, churches were adorned with marble altars and new floors, and as many as three banks were founded: the Banca Circondariale del Sannio, which was headed by Giuseppe D'Andrea; the Banca Popolare Cooperativa, which was headed by Antonio Venditti; and the Banca Popolare di Cerreto Sannita, which was sponsored by priests and Catholics. World War I and the subsequent economic recession caused the failure of the three banks, the loss of the savings of the people of Cerreto and the beginning of a long period of economic, social and intellectual decline.

During World War I, the collegiate church of San Martino, along with the church of San Nicola (no longer existing), had to accommodate two thousand troops of the 31st Infantry Regiment of the Siena Brigade. The soldiers caused some damage since the bishop at the time, Msgr. Iannacchino, sent a telegram to Archpriest Francesco Ciaburri in which he advised observing "[...] the provision of the telegram of the Ministry to avoid greater evils."

Distinguished on the front was Nicola Rotondi, who was awarded the silver medal for military valor.

==== Fascist dictatorship and World War II ====
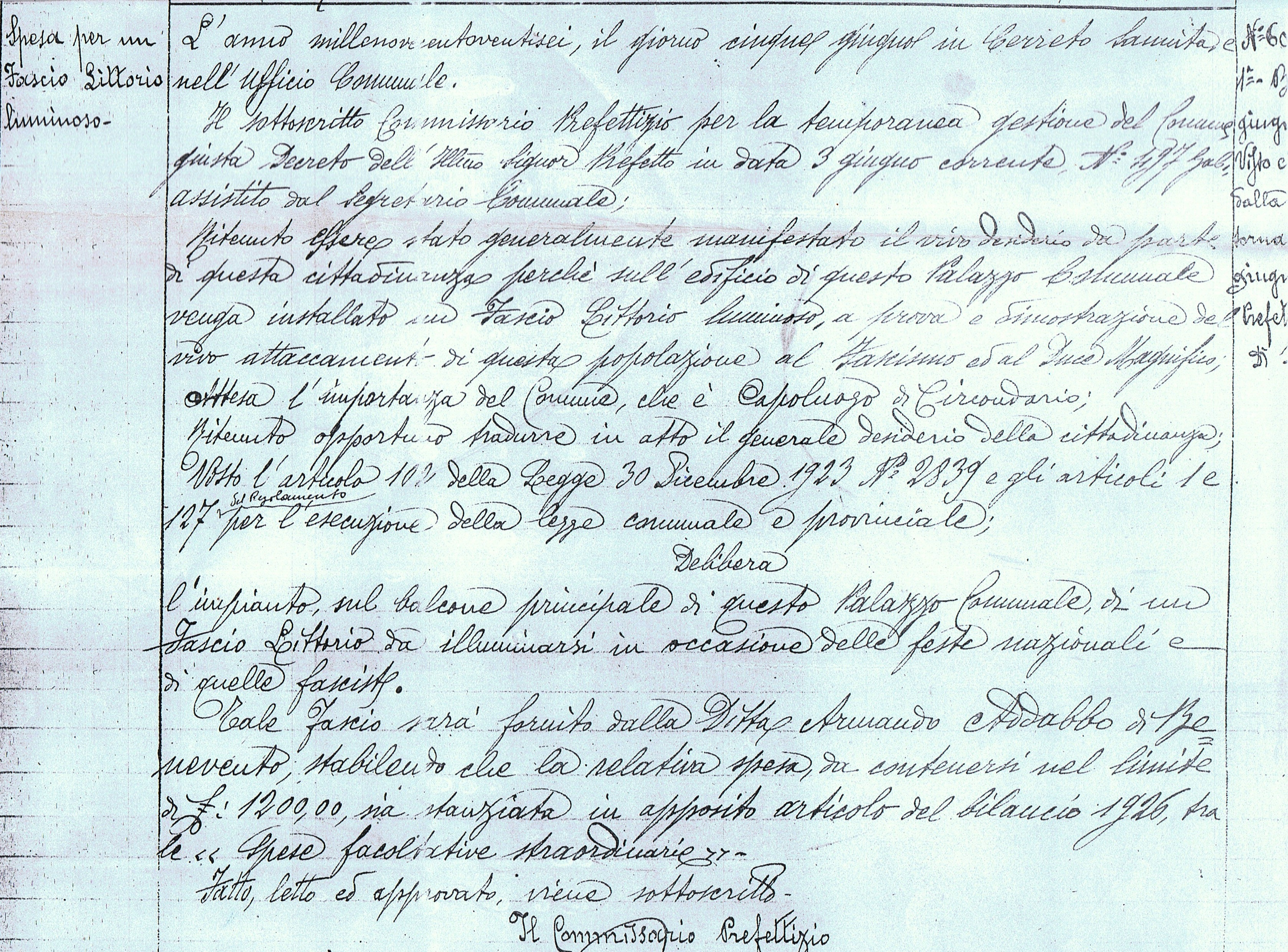
The resolution of the prefectural commissioner by which, immediately after the defenestration of the Pilella administration, it was decided to install a luminous fasces. The resolution reads "[...] The undersigned Prefectural Commissioner for the temporary management of the municipality [...] considering to have been generally manifested the lively desire on the part of this citizenry that in the building of this Municipal Palace a Luminous Fasces be installed, as proof and demonstration of the lively attachment of this population to Fascism and to the Magnificent Duce; given the importance of the Municipality which is the District Capital [. ...] resolves the installation, on the main balcony of this Municipal Palace, of a Fasces to be illuminated on the occasion of national and Fascist holidays [...]."

On September 13, 1925, a war memorial depicting a soldier was unveiled in St. Martin's Square, which was melted down during World War II for ammunition. A witness writes that "[...] the square was packed with people; from the balconies hung flags to the smile of a sun that lit up the square [...]."

With the advent of the fascist dictatorship Cerreto Sannita had a period of relative social tranquility until 1926 when a group of troublemakers broke into the town hall where a meeting of the democratically elected town council was in progress years earlier. The mayor, notary Domenico Pilella, was forced to resign and was escorted from the town hall to his home by the carabinieri for fear of violence by the squadrists. The prefect, who in May of that year, in a report to the minister of the Interior, had praised Pilella's administration, writing that it "enjoyed the full and unconditional confidence of all the citizenship, without distinction of parties and persons [...]," two months later and following the incursion of the troublemakers unreservedly supported the violence of the squadrists and the new mayor Michele Ungaro, nephew and namesake of the first president of the province of Benevento.

Members of the Pilella junta were punished by Fascist squadrists: the façade of senior alderman Luigi Pescitelli's pharmacy was sullied with tar and Mussolini's profile was painted on it; Dr. Cofrancesco, another alderman, had the windows of his house subjected to a heavy stone pelting; alderman Michele Piscitelli had his law office in Benevento destroyed.

The fascists also installed a large fasces illuminated by numerous light bulbs that they placed on the facade of the town hall and which was lit on national and fascist anniversaries.

Senator Giuseppe D'Andrea of Cerreto was appointed to the commission that was to judge some Fascist officers regarding the Matteotti murder and other crimes. D'Andrea accepted the appointment but after the first sittings, because of his desire to actually shed light on the events, he received an anonymous notice written on the letterhead of the Chamber of Deputies: "Illustrious Senator, We are perfectly well informed that you in the Investigating Commission of the High Court of Justice represent the current that is resentfully hostile to H.E. De Bono, in that for ignoble political grudges you would like to see him unjustly sacrificed to the revenges of the Aventine. Beware that the game could be very dangerous for you and for all that is dear to you. At the point things have reached, one cannot have scruples or pity even for the so-called sanctuary of private life. On the other hand, the struggle is now engaged in such a way that one more or less person found lying at one side of the road does not matter. So much I believed I had to communicate to you to try to avoid painful and irreparable events. One who knows."

During Fascism several associations were closed or converted to the aims of the regime, such as the Workers' Society, which was in danger of being dissolved like many other sister associations in Italy. In 1929 the political secretary of the Cerretese fascio requested the use of the association's hall for a period of several months. The request was considered at the assembly on December 30 of that year, but due to the clear opposition of the members and the emergence of an "untamable disorder," the meeting was dissolved. The meeting was reconvened a few days later in the presence of Mayor Michele Ungaro, grandson of the founder of the Workers' Society. The mayor assured the members that he would never allow the sodality that his grandfather had founded to be absorbed into fascist organizations, thus getting the go-ahead from the members to grant the hall. In 1934 the political secretary of the Cerretese fascio again asked for the Society's premises to be used as the headquarters of the "Fascio giovanile di combattimento." He also asked for: a copy of the Society's bylaws, a list of members and the names of the board of directors, asking also to be notified in time of meetings, elections and members proposed to hold social offices. Finally, in 1940 the change of the original name to "Dopolavoro della Società operaia di Cerreto Sannita" was ordered.

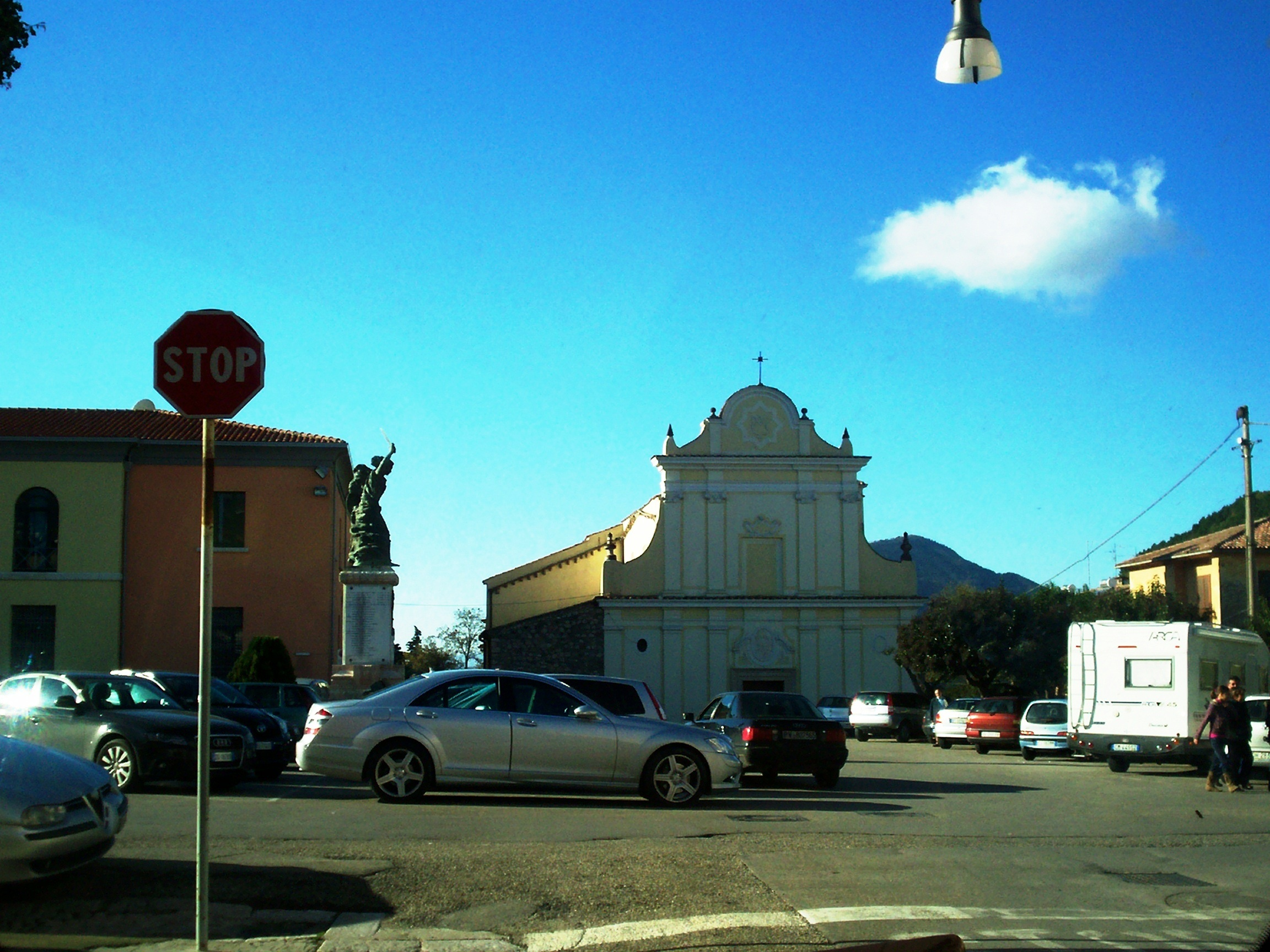
The Church of Santa Maria di Costantinopoli with a glimpse of Piazza Luigi Sodo in Cerreto Sannita

Despite the violence and abuse, several charitable initiatives were implemented, such as cash prizes for large families, gymnastic and sports festivals, theatrical performances and summer camps at the former Poor Clare Monastery. The municipal theater was also destroyed to make room for the Casa del Fascio, now the Genio building, and in 1938 the Luigi Sodo paritarian classical high school was born in the building of the Diocesan Seminary of Cerreto Sannita. Meanwhile, clashes between young people from San Lorenzello and Cerreto Sannita continued because of parochial reasons and old discords. The people of San Lorenzello were called "cacanuzzi" and "ungrateful sons" by their opponents, while the people of Cerreto were called "scorzapatan" "accid p'ducch" and "sona campan" (potato peelers, louse killers and bell ringers). The youths of the two towns faced each other many times by throwing stones and any other material especially on the day of the commemoration of the dead when the space existing between the cemeteries of the two towns became a real battlefield. On the evening of May 5, 1936, immediately after the news of the conquest of Addis Ababa by the Italians, young fascists from Cerreto under the command of Umberto Biondi headed to San Lorenzello with an olive branch, a symbol of peace, to call for an end to hostilities between the two towns.

During World War II Cerreto Sannita hosted numerous soldiers for military exercises on Mount Coppe and had visiting Prince Umberto of Savoy. In 1943 the situation became dramatic: the retreating Germans were responsible for several killings and deportations. The town, however, was not touched by Allied bombardment as opposed to nearby Faicchio; however, it suffered considerably in trade and communications with other centers because the Germans blew up with explosives the three bridges connecting the town to the centers of Cusano Mutri, Telese Terme and Guardia Sanframondi.

Distinguished during World War II was Cerreto-born Michele Mattei, who in the East African campaign lost his life for shielding himself from a bullet aimed at one of his superiors. For this gesture he was awarded the gold medal for military valor. Also distinguished were Amedeo Franco, silver medal for military valor; Isidoro Mastrobuoni, bronze medal for military valor; and Giuseppe Di Crosta, who was awarded the war cross for military valor.

=== Post World War II to the present ===
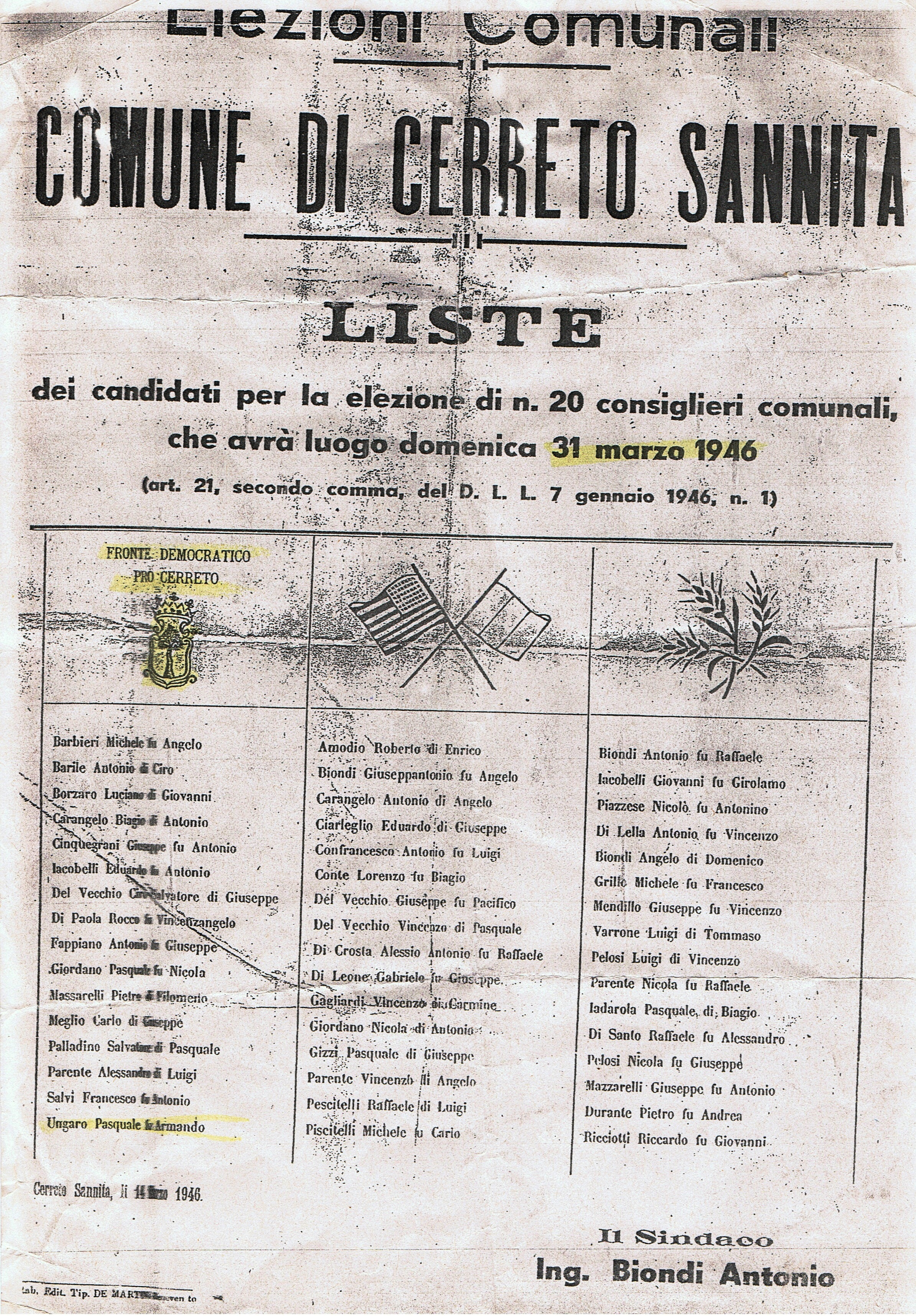
Poster for the March 31, 1946 municipal elections.

In 1944, during World War II, the prefect appointed a provisional council headed by mayor engineer Antonio Biondi. The Biondi administration had to face quite a few problems: unemployment was rampant, food prices were constantly rising, and bridges connecting Cerreto Sannita to neighboring towns had been blown up by retreating Germans. Great sacrifices were made to rebuild the collapsed bridges such as the one located near the cemetery, the one located near Villa Langer, the one on the road to Guardia Sanframondi and the "Turio" and "Lavello" bridges on the road to Cusano Mutri. In order to create as many jobs as possible, the sewerage system in the historic center was also rebuilt.

In 1946 the first democratic elections in more than twenty years were held. Lawyer Pasquale Ungaro, a descendant of an ancient and noble Cerretese family, was elected mayor. The Ungaro administration worked to initiate vocational training courses and to carry out public works in order to reduce high unemployment. During these years, emigration surged, which stopped only with the economic boom, and the resident population began to decline.

In the 1950s, thanks to the efforts of some young ceramists and the Cerretese Salvatore Biondi, a new interest was born in ceramics from Cerreto Sannita and San Lorenzello. Biondi collected hundreds of majolica pieces that he displayed in numerous exhibitions around Italy. At an exhibition organized in 1950 in Benevento he received praise from President of the Republic Luigi Einaudi, who was also a collector of ceramics. The president suggested that Biondi ask the relevant authorities to establish a ceramics school so that he could pass on this ancient art form to future generations.

In the following years numerous newspapers reported articles pertaining to the history and artifacts of Cerreto ceramics. Guido Piovene in his work Viaggio in Italia wrote a few pages about Cerreto Sannita and described some of the most significant works kept in Salvatore Biondi's collection. Finally, after several requests, the ceramics art school (now the State Art Institute of Cerreto Sannita) was established in 1957.

Meanwhile, in 1960 the Technical, Commercial and Surveyor's Institute was established, while in the former monastery of the Poor Clares, run by the Sisters of Charity of Our Lady of Good and Perpetual Help, a teacher's college and a language high school were established. In those years the war memorial depicting the winged victory was inaugurated. In the two world wars Cerreto Sannita had lost eighty-six young men.

In those years the town was turned into a film set for the shooting of three important films: Maddalena (1953) with Märta Torén and Gino Cervi; La bella mugnaia (1955) with Sophia Loren, Marcello Mastroianni and Vittorio De Sica; and I briganti italiani (1961) with Ernest Borgnine, Vittorio Gassman and Rosanna Schiaffino.

The town suffered some damage following the 1980 Irpinia earthquake and the recent San Giuliano di Puglia earthquake, as a result of which the building housing the elementary school was declared unusable and reopened after extensive renovations in December 2008.

In 1984 the local hospital was opened.

In 1988, on the occasion of the 300th anniversary of the building of the old town, the town was the site of a "Design Workshop." Several nationally renowned designers drew up numerous projects in order to redevelop some areas of the town center that were in a state of decay. The most important projects presented concerned the creation of belvederes towards the Matese and the Titerno valley, the enhancement of the entrance to the historic center, the construction of a covered market where the parish center now stands, and the reconstruction of the building housing the elementary school. However, none of these projects has been realized.

Since 2007, the town has been affected by numerous protests and heated demonstrations against the conversion of the Maria delle Grazie hospital decreed by Regional Law No. 24/2006. Despite protests and numerous appeals to the relevant authorities, the medicine, orthopedics, surgery and cardiology departments of Cerreto Sannita Hospital were closed and dismantled. In August 2011, the transformation of the health facility into a "community hospital" was underway, meaning the building will become home only to an emergency room and social work offices.

== See also ==
- Cerreto Sannita
- 1688 Sannio earthquake
- Giovanni Battista de Belli

== Bibliography ==
- VV., AA. (1991). Cerreto Sannita: Testimonianze d'arte tra Sette e Ottocento. Napoli: Edizioni Scientifiche Italiane.
- VV., AA. (2010). Cerreto Sannita. Cerreto Sannita: Società Operaia di Cerreto Sannita.
- VV., AA. (1995). Guida di Cerreto Sannita. Cerreto Sannita: Pubblitaf.
- VV., AA. (2007). La Ceramica di Cerreto Sannita e San Lorenzello. San Lorenzello: E.C.S.C.S.L.M.
- VV., AA. (2011). Poesie cerretesi di ieri, di oggi e di domani. Cerreto Sannita: Quaderni della Società Operaia di Cerreto Sannita.
- Biondi, Adam (2020). Il Ponte Michele Ungaro di Cerreto Sannita, già di Annibale in Annuario di storia, cultura e varia umanità ASVT anno V. Associazione Storica della Valle Telesina.
- Biondi, Adam (2019). La Cerreto degli anni di Michele Ungaro in Michele Ungaro: scritti per il bicentenario della nasHarvtxt. Cerreto Sannita: Società Operaia di Mutuo Soccorso di Cerreto Sannita.
- Biondi, Salvatore (2001). Storia delle antichissime ceramiche di Cerreto Sannita. Cerreto Sannita: nuova edizione a cura della Pro Loco.
- Ciaburri, Nicola (1987). La ricostruzione di Cerreto Sannita dopo il terremoto del 1688 in: Illuminismo meridionale e Comunità locali. ed. Guida.
- Ciaburri, Nicola (1989). Di Città cadute per tremuoti... in: Cerreto Sannita - laboratorio di progettazione 1988. Kappa ed.
- De Nicola, Giuseppe (2019). Notizie storiche ed urbanistiche di Cerreto antica. Cerreto Sannita: Società Operaia di Mutuo Soccorso di Cerreto Sannita.
- Franco, Domenico (1949). Cerreto Sannita ai margini della rivolta di Masaniello. estratto dalla rivista SAMNIVM n. 1-2.
- Franco, Domenico (1966). L'industria dei panni lana nella vecchia e nuova Cerreto. Napoli: estratto dalla rivista SAMNIVM n. 3-4/1965 e n. 1-2/1966.
- Mazzacane, Vincenzo (1990). Memorie storiche di Cerreto Sannita. Liguori Editore.
- Pescitelli, Renato (1977). Chiesa Telesina: luoghi di culto, di educazione e di assistenza nel XVI e XVII secolo. Benevento: Auxiliatrix.
- Pescitelli, Renato (2011). Documenti di Storia Municipale di Cerreto: Regesto delle deliberazioni del Decurionato degli anni 1808-1813. Cerreto Sannita: TetaPrint.
- Pescitelli, Renato (1989). La Chiesa Cattedrale, il Seminario e l'Episcopio in Cerreto Sannita. Laurenziana.
- Pescitelli, Renato (1990). La Chiesa Collegiata di San Martino Vescovo in Cerreto Sannita. Don Bosco.
- Pescitelli, Renato (2001). Palazzi, Case e famiglie cerretesi del XVIII secolo: la rinascita, l'urbanistica e la società di Cerreto Sannita dopo il sisma del 1688. Don Bosco.
- Pescitelli, Renato (1969). Pietro Paolo Fusco nella Cerreto del primo '900. A.B.E.T.E.
- Pro Loco Cerreto Sannita (2003). Una passeggiata nella storia. Di Lauro.
- Rotondi, Nicola (1870). Memorie storiche di Cerreto Sannita. manoscritto inedito conservato nell'Archivio Comunale.
- Russo, Flavio (1991). Dai Sanniti all'Esercito Italiano: La Regione Fortificata del Matese. Ufficio Storico Stato Maggiore Esercito.
- Vigliotti, Nicola (1970). I Giustiniani e la ceramica cerretese. LER.
- Vigliotti, Nicola (2007). L'epitaffio dimenticato: rilevanze storiche. A. Di Leone & C.
- Vigliotti, Nicola (2000). Il Culto Micaelico nella Grotta della Leonessa. Cerreto Sannita: Comunità Montana del Titerno.
