= 1688 Sannio earthquake =

Earthquake in southern Italy in 1688

- Location within Italy
- Local date: June 5, 1688
- Local time: Late afternoon
- Magnitude: 7.0 M_{w}
- Epicentre: 41°16′N 14°35′E
- Areas affected: Campania
- Max. intensity: MMI XI (Extreme)
- Casualties: est. 10,000 dead

The 1688 Sannio earthquake occurred in the late afternoon of June 5 in the province of Benevento of southern Italy. The moment magnitude is estimated at 7.0, with a Mercalli intensity of XI. It severely damaged numerous towns in a vast area, completely destroying Cerreto Sannita and Guardia Sanframondi. The exact number of victims is unknown, although it is estimated to total approximately 10,000. It is among the most destructive earthquakes in the history of Italy.

== Earthquake ==
The earthquake occurred in the southern and central part of the Apennines, an earthquake-prone area where several large faults are present, and where extensional tectonics phenomena are common due to the collision of the African plate with the Eurasian plate.

The earthquake was preceded by lighter earthquakes starting in February 1688 and by a series of foreshocks in the days before the main shock. It was followed by aftershocks lasting at least until December of that year. The magnitude of the main shock is reported as 6.98 ±0.12 by the Italian National Institute of Geophysics and Volcanology, while the Mercalli intensity is estimated as XI (Extreme). The epicentral area was to the southeast of the Matese massif and to the northwest of Benevento, between the Calore river and one of its tributaries, the Tammaro. In this area the maximum Mercalli intensity of XI was reached, while in Naples the intensity was VII–VIII. The shock was perceived in five regions of Southern Italy, in an area of 80,000 square kilometres (31,000 sq mi).

== Damage ==
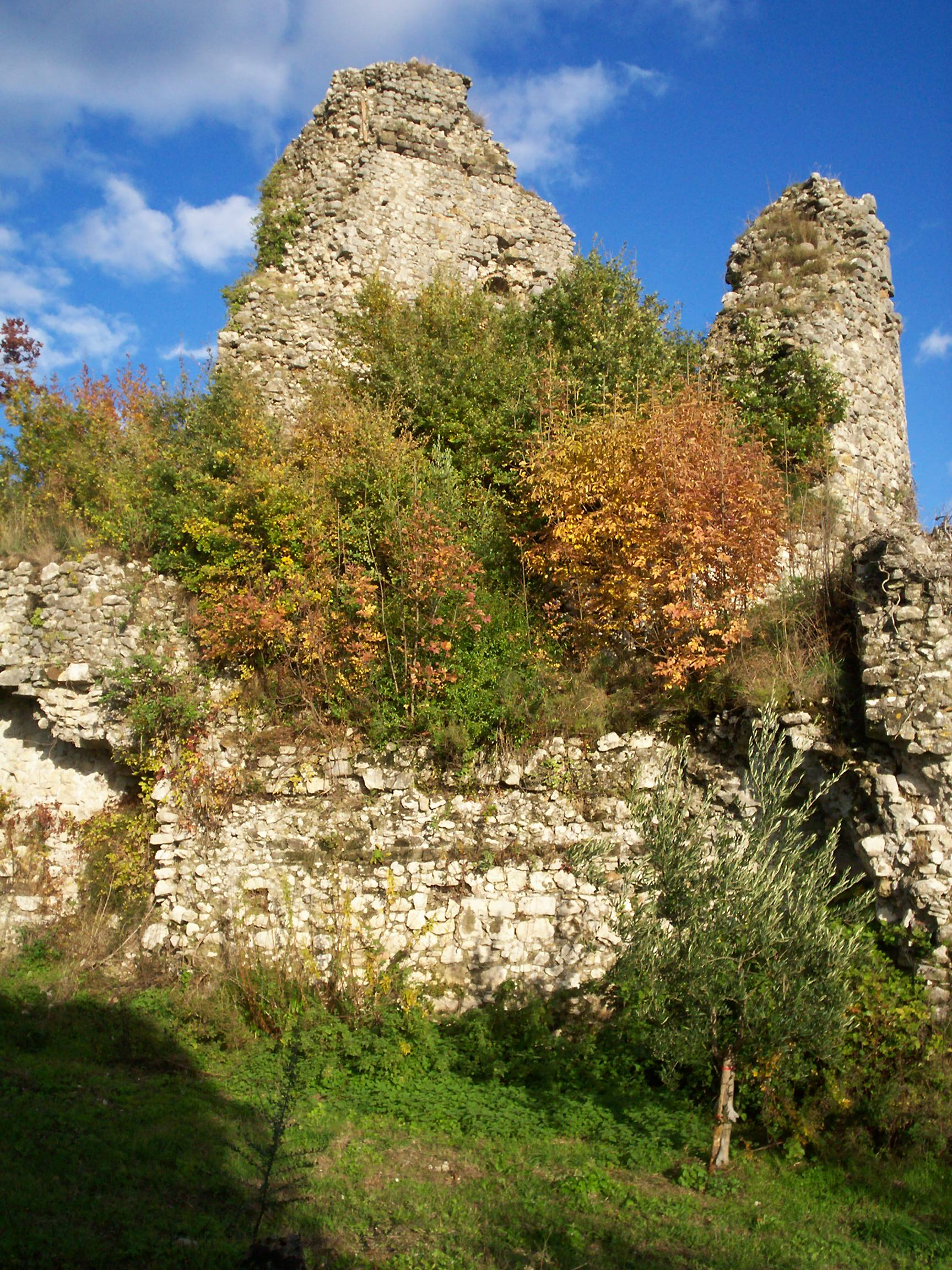
Ruins of the old Cerreto town, completely destroyed in the earthquake.

Three towns were completely destroyed by the earthquake: Cerreto Sannita, Guardia Sanframondi, and Civitella Licinio, a frazione of Cusano Mutri. In 20 more villages and towns near the epicentre, destruction was almost total. In an area of 50,000 square kilometres (19,000 sq mi), about 120 settlements took extensive damage, while about 40–50 other towns were damaged only slightly.

Benevento was hit harshly by the earthquake, with over 80% of the buildings being significantly damaged or destroyed, including the Santa Sofia church. The poor quality of the buildings was a determining factor of extent of the damages. Avellino and Naples also experienced extensive destruction, with several collapsed or damaged buildings; in Naples, more than thirty churches and religious buildings were severely damaged. In Cerreto Sannita only three houses remained standing, with the destruction also of a Poor Clares monastery and a Franciscan one.

== Casualties ==
The exact number of deaths resulting from the earthquake is unknown, but it is estimated to total approximately 10,000. Cerreto Sannita, the hardest-hit town, lost half its inhabitants, 4,000 out of 8,000. In Civitella Licinio, which was completely destroyed, the only survivors were those who were working in the fields when the earthquake hit. In Guardia Sanframondi there were more than 1,000 victims. In Benevento 1,367 people died out of a population of 7,500; the number of deaths was lower because many citizens were working in the countryside at the time. Hundreds of people died in San Lorenzello, due to a landslide. Several deaths were recorded also in Naples, Avellino and other towns.

== Effects ==
=== Environmental effects ===
The earthquake caused several landslides originating from the Matese and other mountainsides, among which a large landslide that devastated the town of San Lorenzello. The courses of the Sabato and the Volturno rivers was altered. In the mountains of the Sannio, large clefts opened, new springs were formed and preexistent springs became muddy.

=== Societal effects ===
The earthquake had a strong impact on the economy and the social fabric of the affected area, which at the time belonged to the Kingdom of Naples, except for Benevento, which was an exclave of the Papal States. The inhabitants of the area abandoned the destroyed and damaged buildings, and lived in makeshift shelters. Furthermore, buildings devoted to food production like mills were also destroyed, affecting the food supply. The two governments involved granted tax relief to the people of the area and put forth other measures to mitigate the societal effects of the earthquake.

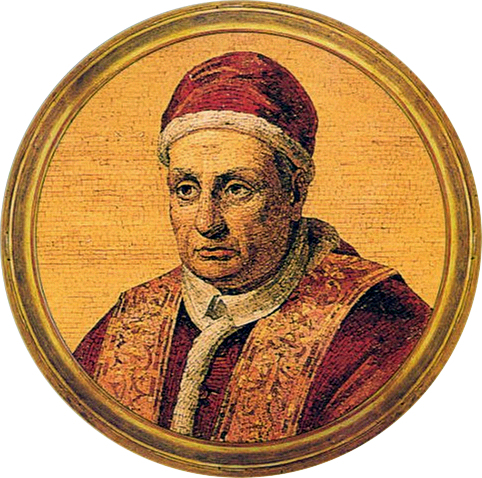
Orsini, here in Papal clothes, survived the earthquake and helped rebuild Benevento.

In Naples, there were episodes of looting and public security issues; the inmates of damaged prisons also escaped or were released. Three weeks after the earthquake governmental and economic activities had not restarted yet. In Benevento, the financial help provided by the Papal States was insufficient, and was mostly used to rebuild public and religious institutions.

== Aftermath ==
In Benevento reconstruction was slow, and hindered by contrasts between the citizens and the Papal authorities. Another strong earthquake hit the town 14 years later, in 1702, further slowing down the efforts to rebuild the town. Vincenzo Maria Orsini, who later became Pope Benedict XIII, was archbishop of Benevento at the time. He survived the earthquake and gave a decisive contribution to rebuilding efforts. The Papal States sent experts to Benevento: they ascertained that the houses that used river pebbles had fared worse than those built with bricks. They suggested to rebuild the houses with bricks or square stones.

Cerreto Sannita was rebuilt under the supervision of the Count Marzio Carafa, feudal lord of the town. The old, destroyed settlement was abandoned and rebuilt nearby at a lower altitude, in a place with safer, more stable soil. Acting under the guidance of engineers and technicians, the new town was made with larger roads, square blocks of houses, buildings with only one or two floors, and other safety measures.

== See also ==
- Cerreto Sannita
- List of earthquakes in Italy
- List of historical earthquakes
- San Lupo
- History of Cerreto Sannita
