= Giovanni Battista de Belli =

Italian Roman Catholic prelate

Most Reverend Giovanni Battista de Belli
- Church: Catholic Church
- Diocese: Diocese of Telese o Cerreto Sannita
- In office: 1684–1693
- Predecessor: Domenico Cito
- Successor: Biagio Gambaro

Orders
- Consecration: 1 May 1684 by Alessandro Crescenzi (cardinal)

Personal details
- Born: 27 March 1630 Pisciotta, Italy
- Died: September 1693 (age 63)

Giovanni Battista de Belli (27 March 1630 – September, 1693) was a Roman Catholic prelate who served as Bishop of Telese o Cerreto Sannita (1684–1693).

== Biography ==
Giovanni Battista de Belli was born in Pisciotta, Italy on 27 March 1630. On 24 April 1684, he was appointed during the papacy of Pope Innocent XI as Bishop of Telese o Cerreto Sannita. On 1 May 1684, he was consecrated bishop by Alessandro Crescenzi (cardinal), Cardinal-Priest of Santa Prisca, with Francesco Maria Giannotti, Bishop of Segni, and Francesco Onofrio Hodierna, Bishop of Bitetto, serving as co-consecrators. He served as Bishop of Telese o Cerreto Sannita until his death in September 1693.

== See also ==
- Catholic Church in Italy

== External links and additional sources ==
- Cheney, David M. "Diocese of Cerreto Sannita-Telese-Sant'Agata de' Goti". Catholic-Hierarchy.org. (Chronology of Bishops) ^{[self-published]}
- Chow, Gabriel. "Diocese of Cerreto Sannita-Telese-Sant'Agata de' Goti". GCatholic.org. (Chronology of Bishops) ^{[self-published]}

Catholic Church titles
Preceded by Domenico Cito	Bishop of Telese o Cerreto Sannita; 1684–1693	Succeeded by Biagio Gambaro
