= National Museum of Sculpture, Valladolid =

Sculpture museum in Valladolid, Spain

National Museum of Sculpture
- Museo Nacional de Escultura
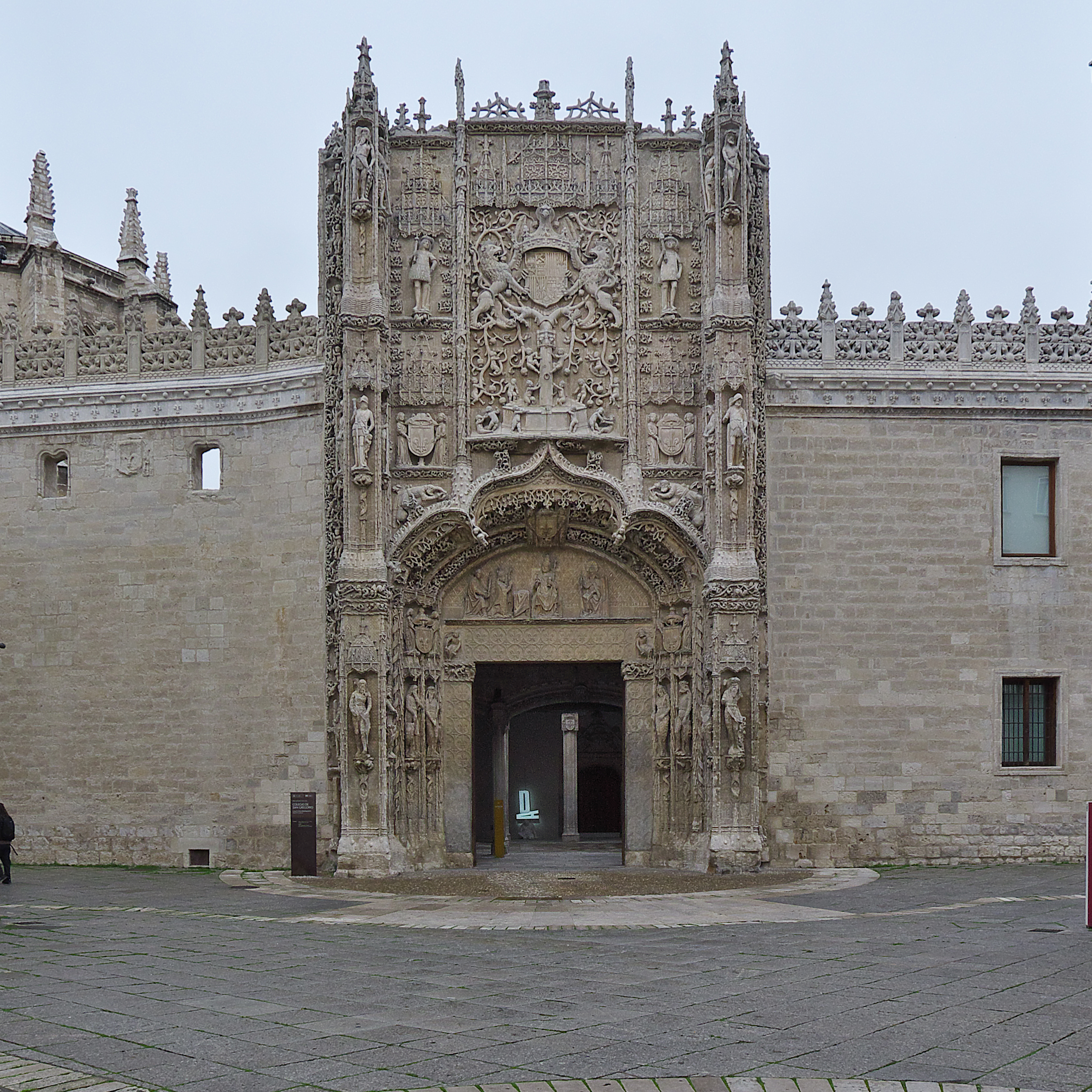
- Main facade of the Colegio de San Gregorio
- Established: 1842
- Location: Colegio de San Gregorio, Valladolid, Spain
- Coordinates: 41°40′N 4°43′W
- Type: Art museum, sculptural museum, Historic site
- Visitors: 145.606 (2012)
- Director: María Bolaños Atienza
- Website: Official website

Spanish Cultural Heritage
- Official name: Museo Nacional de Escultura
- Type: Non-movable
- Criteria: Monument
- Designated: 1962
- Reference no.: RI-51-0001422

The National Museum of Sculpture (Spanish: Museo Nacional de Escultura) is an art museum in Valladolid, Spain, devoted to sculpture. It is one of the National Museums of Spain and it is attached to the Ministry of Culture.

It has an extensive sculptural collection ranging from the Middle Ages to the 19th century. The collections come mostly from churches and monasteries in the Region of Castile, whose pieces of religious art were confiscated by the State in 1836, by order of Minister of Finance Mendizábal. Other parts of the collections come from particular donations, deposits or acquisitions by the State.

The museum was founded as the Provincial Museum of Fine Arts on 4 October 1842. It had its first headquarters at the Palacio de Santa Cruz. On 29 April 1933 it was moved to the Colegio de San Gregorio. Other current seats are in the 16th-century Palacio de Villena and Palacio del Conde de Gondomar.

The museum houses works from the 13th to 19th centuries, executed mostly in the Central Spain, and also in other regions historically connected to Spain (Italy, Flanders, Southern America). Artworks include, among the others, a Raising of the Cross by Francisco del Rincon, I Thirst, and The Way of Calvary Gregorio Fernández, Adoration of the Magi by Alonso Berruguete, Lamentation of Christ by Juan de Juni, Penitent Magdalene by Pedro de Mena or the Holy Sepulchre or passage of the Sleepers Alonso de Rozas.

During the Holy Week in Valladolid the museum gives 104 images (distributed in the corresponding pasos) to the processions for the brotherhoods.

== Gallery of paintings ==
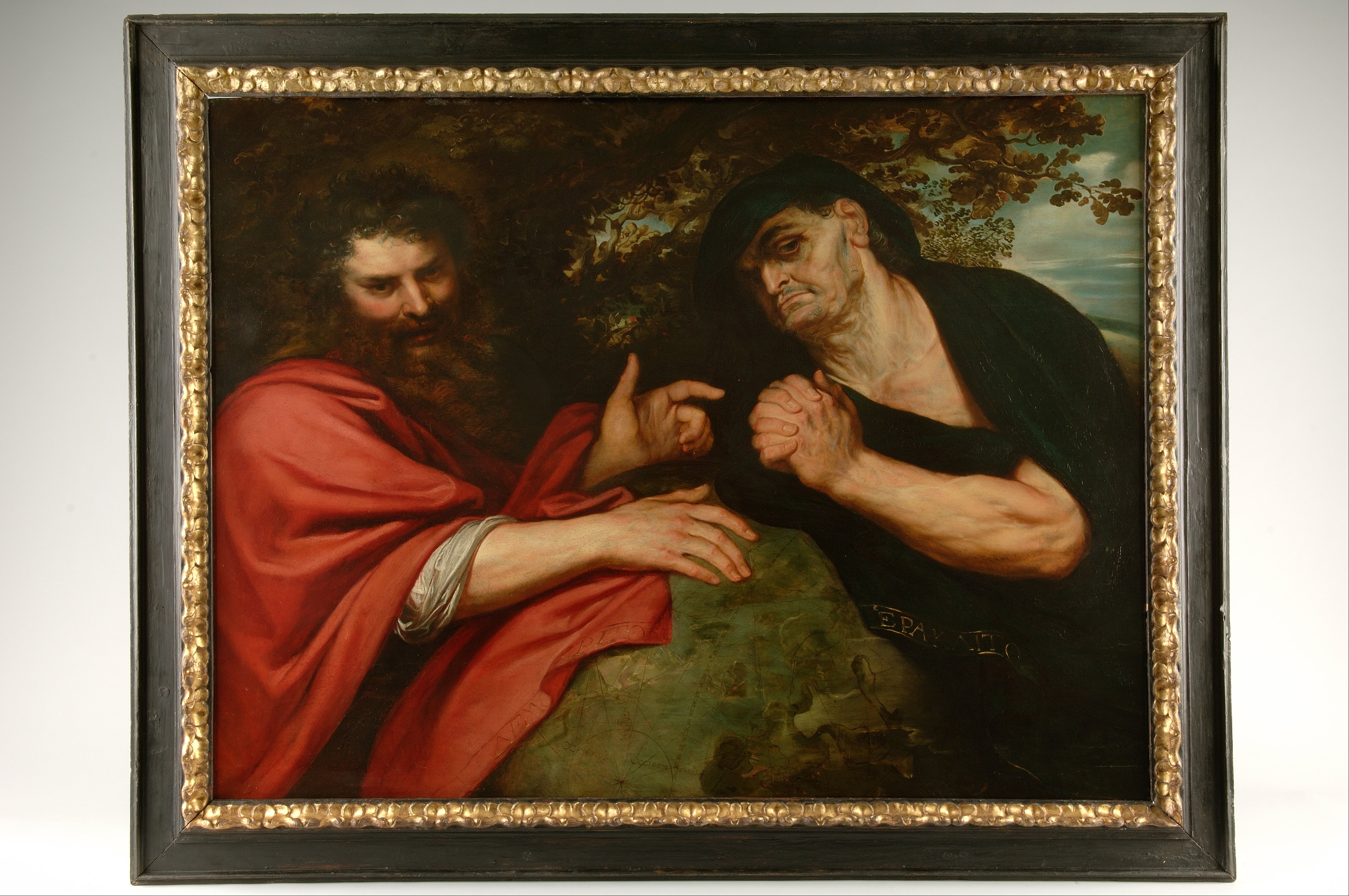
Democritus and Heraclitus by Rubens, 1603

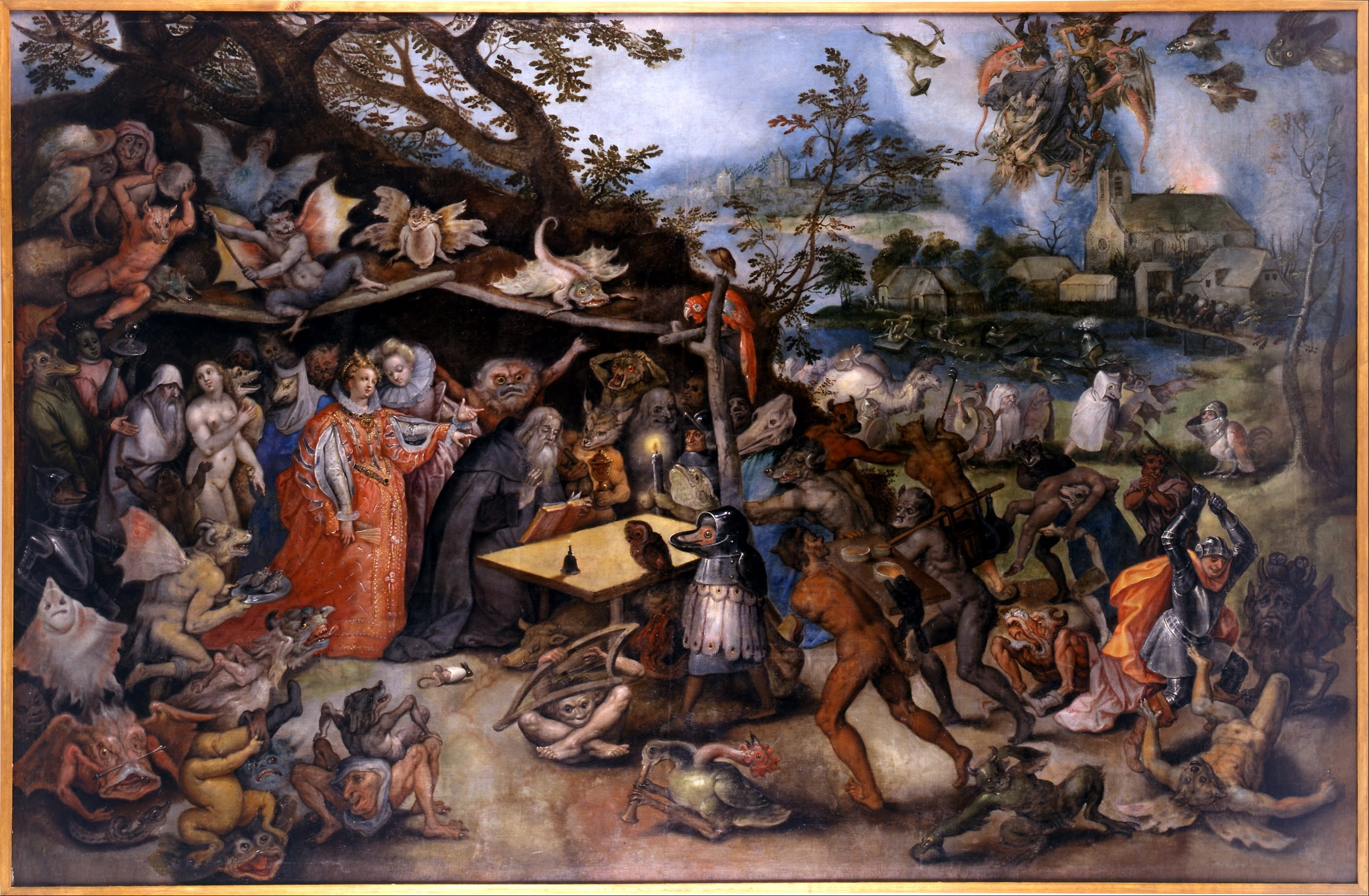
Temptations of San Antonio Abad by Jan Brueghel (first half of the 17th century)

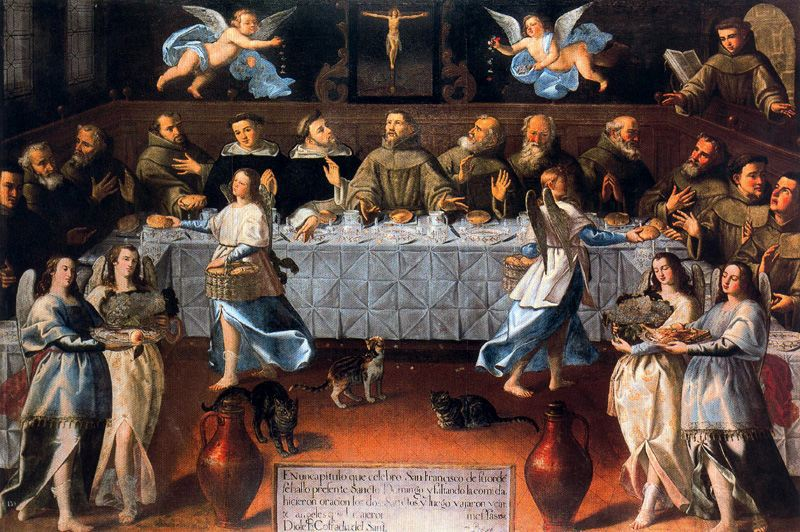
Saint Francisco and Saint Domingo in the refectory by Felipe Gil de Mena (second half of the 17th century)
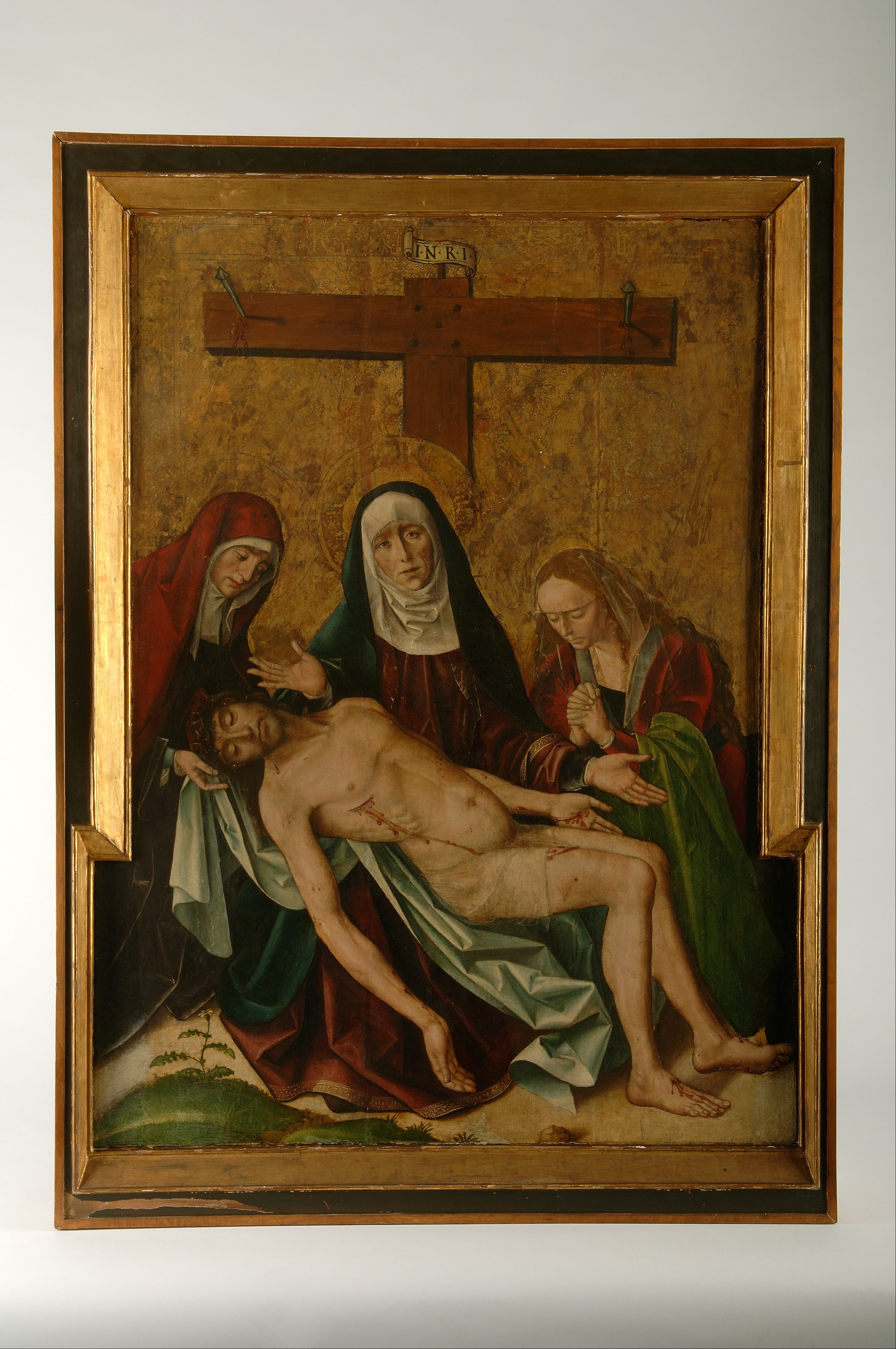
Pity by Pedro Berruguete, 1480

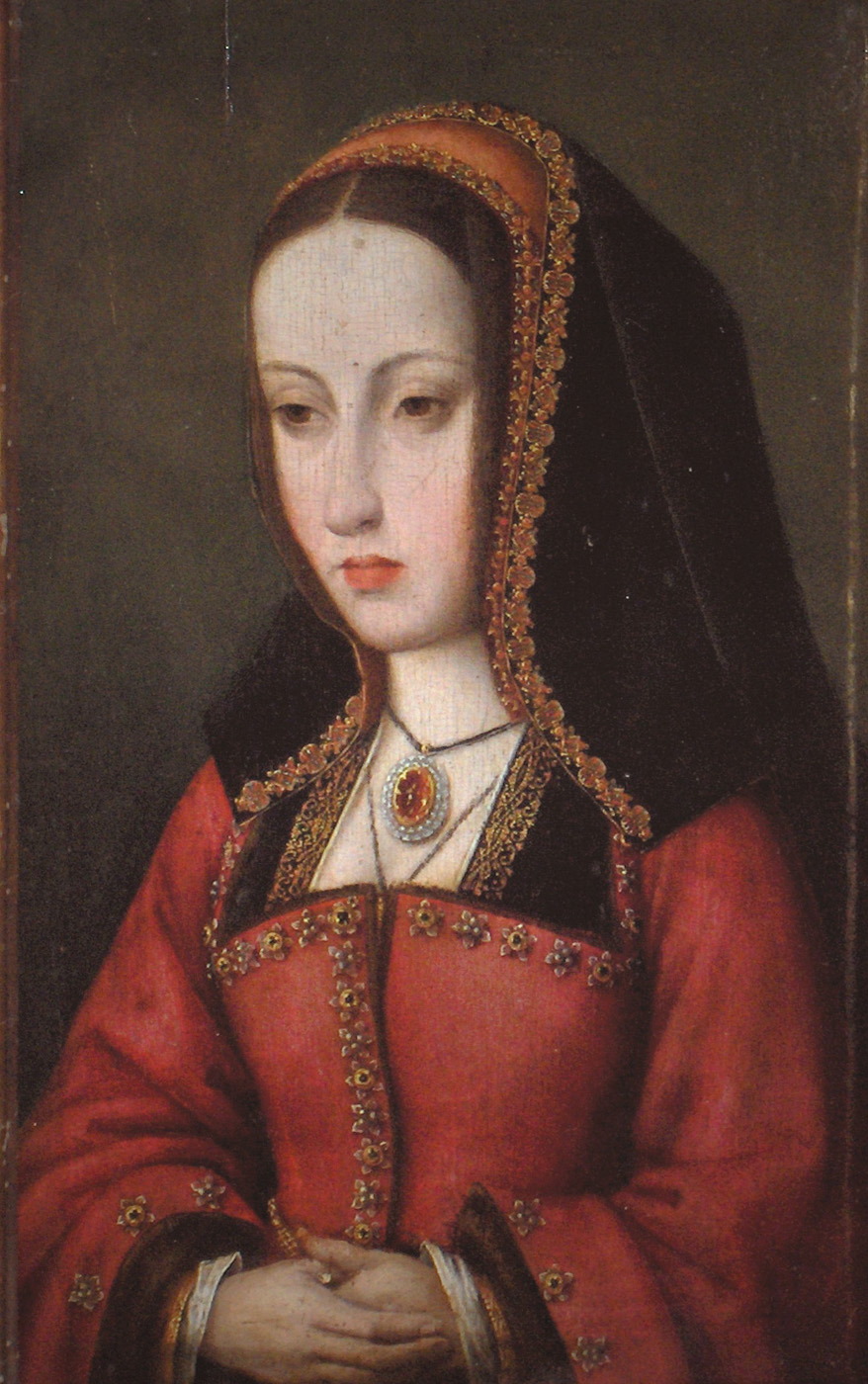
Joanna of Castile, likely by Jacob van Lathem, over 1500

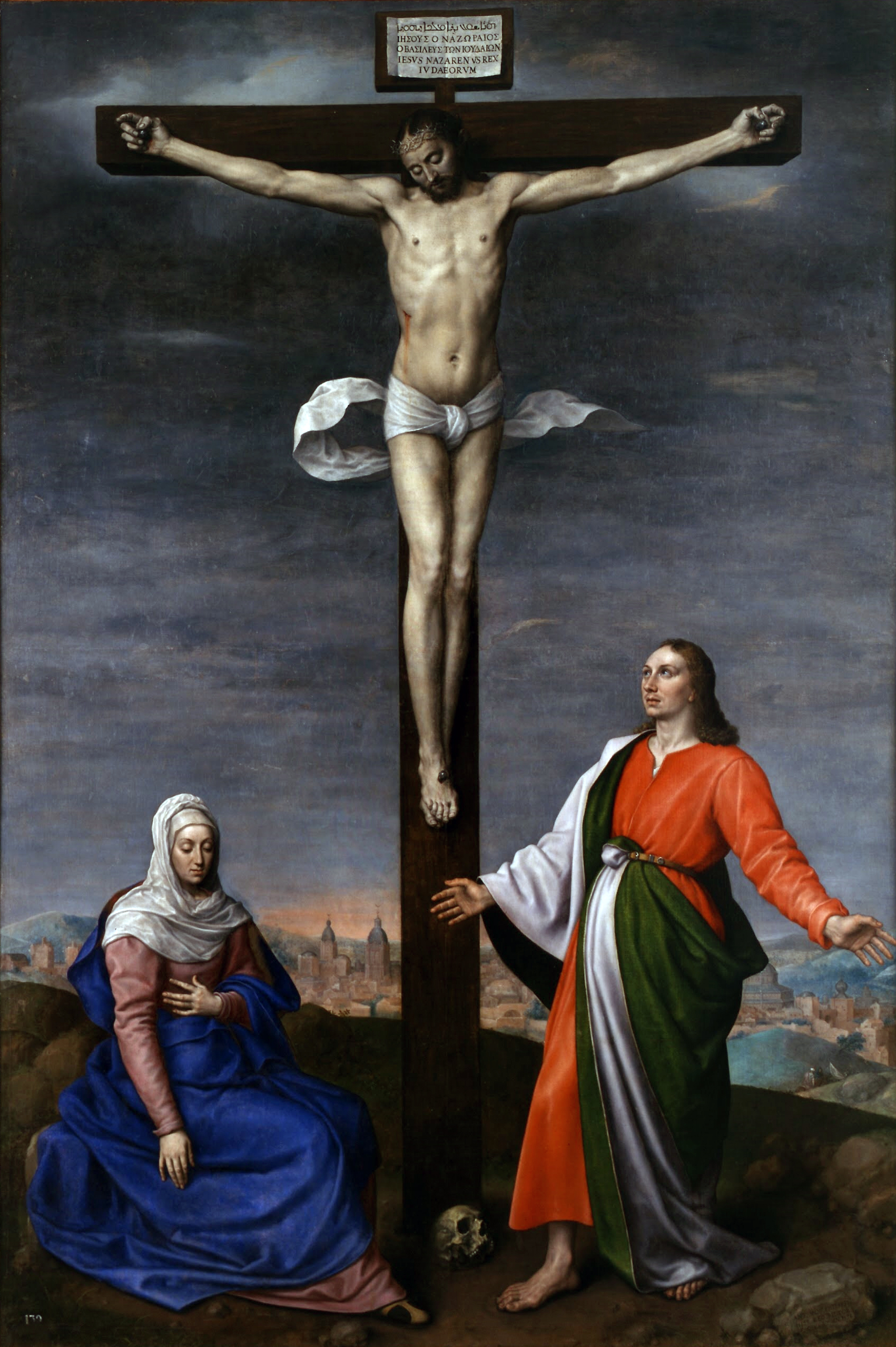
Calvary by Antonio Moro, 1573

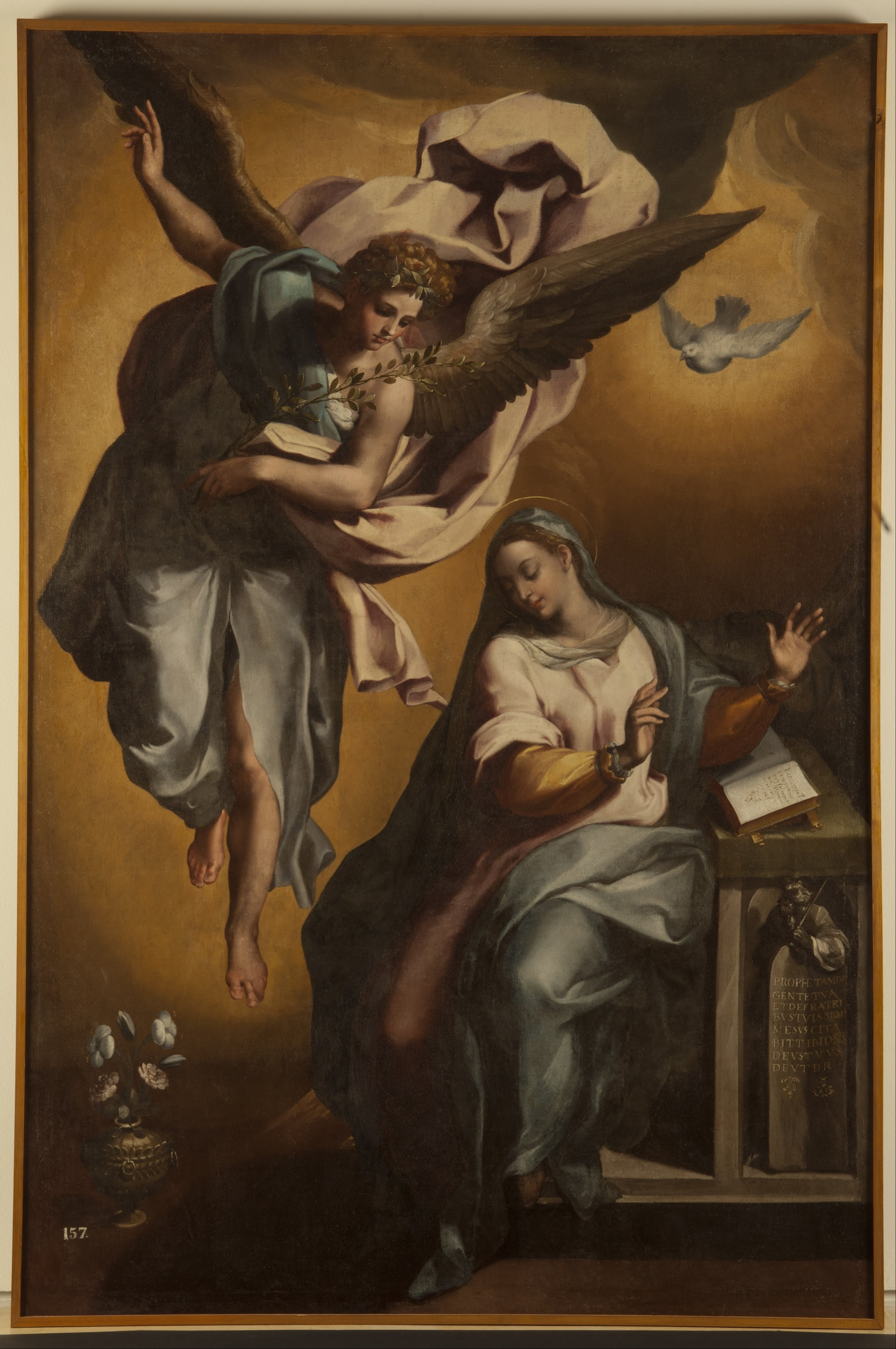
The annunciation of Mary by Gregorio Martínez, 1596

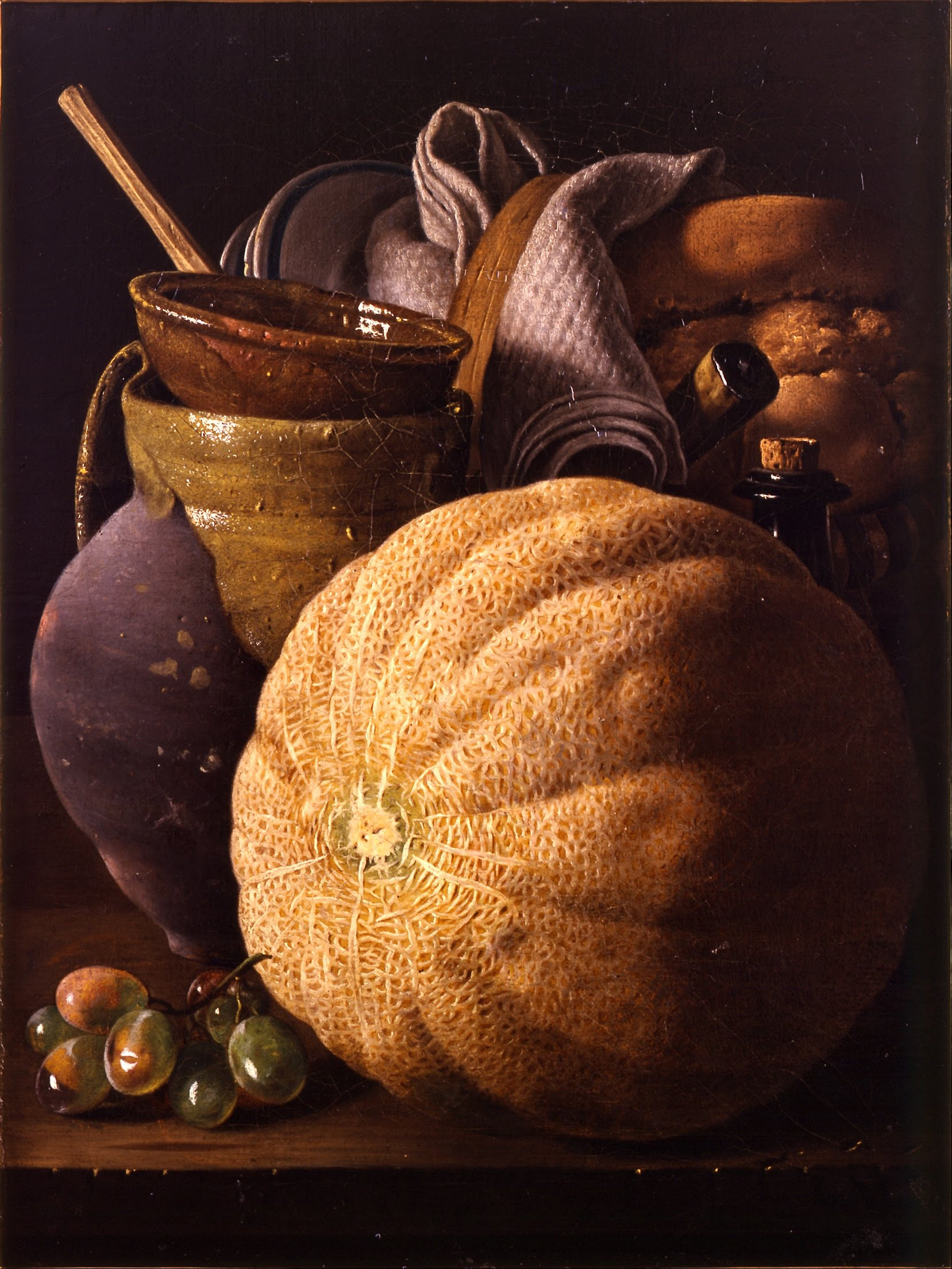
Still Life by Luis Egidio Meléndez, 1765

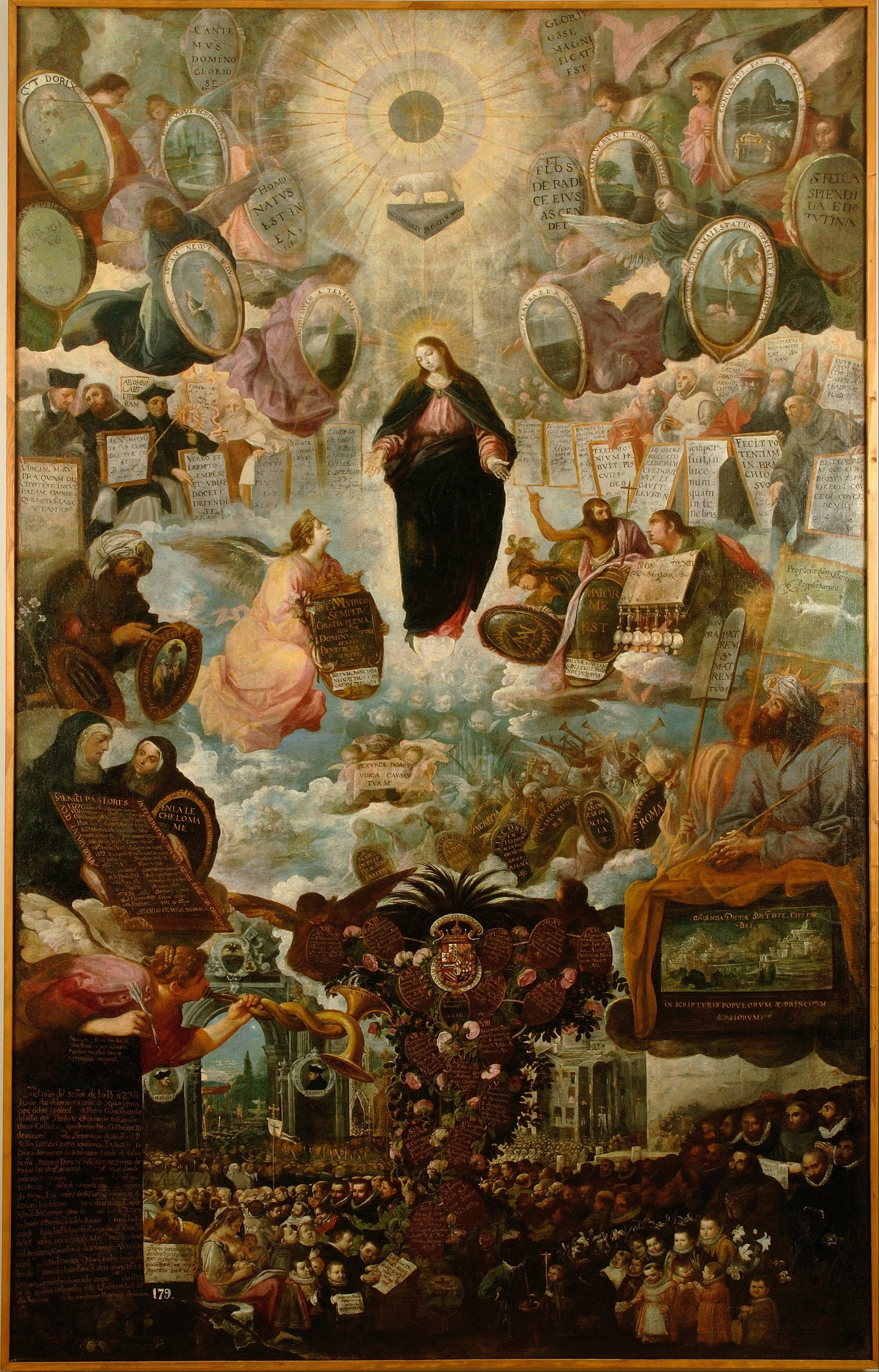
Allegory of the Immaculate Virgin by Juan de Roelas, 1616

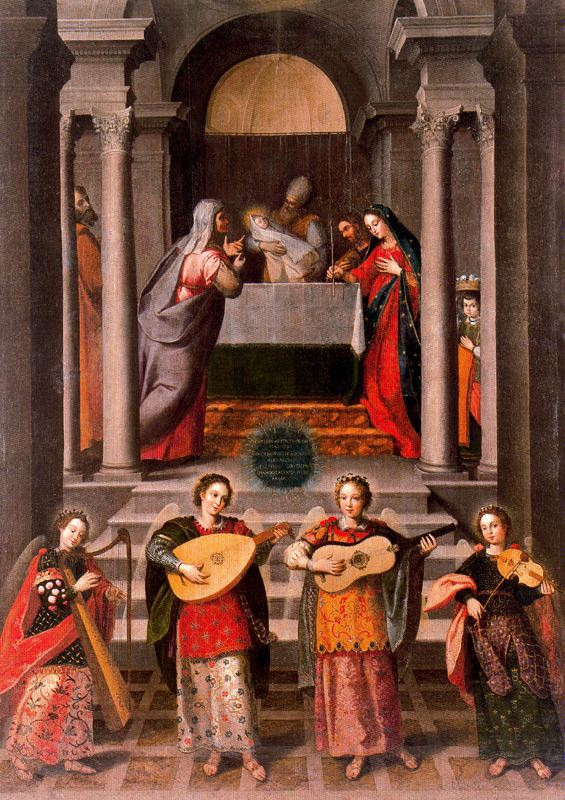
Presentation of the Child in the temple by Diego Valentín Díaz, 1650

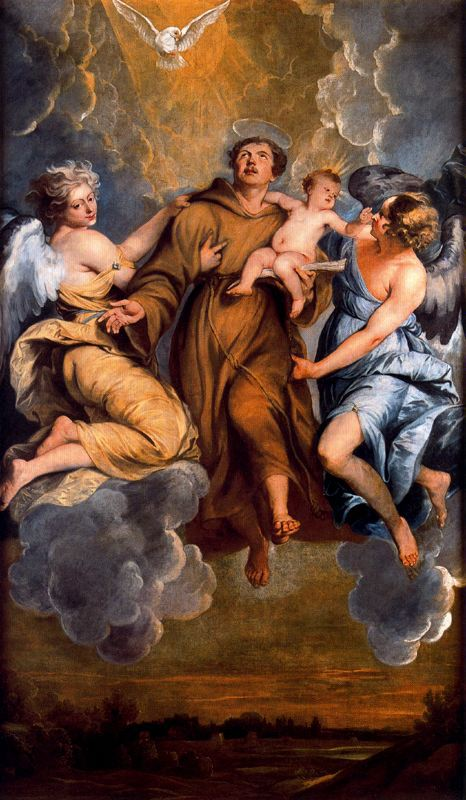
St. Anthony of Padua by Thomas Willeboirts Bosschaert, over 1650

== Gallery of sculptures ==
=== Medieval sculptures ===
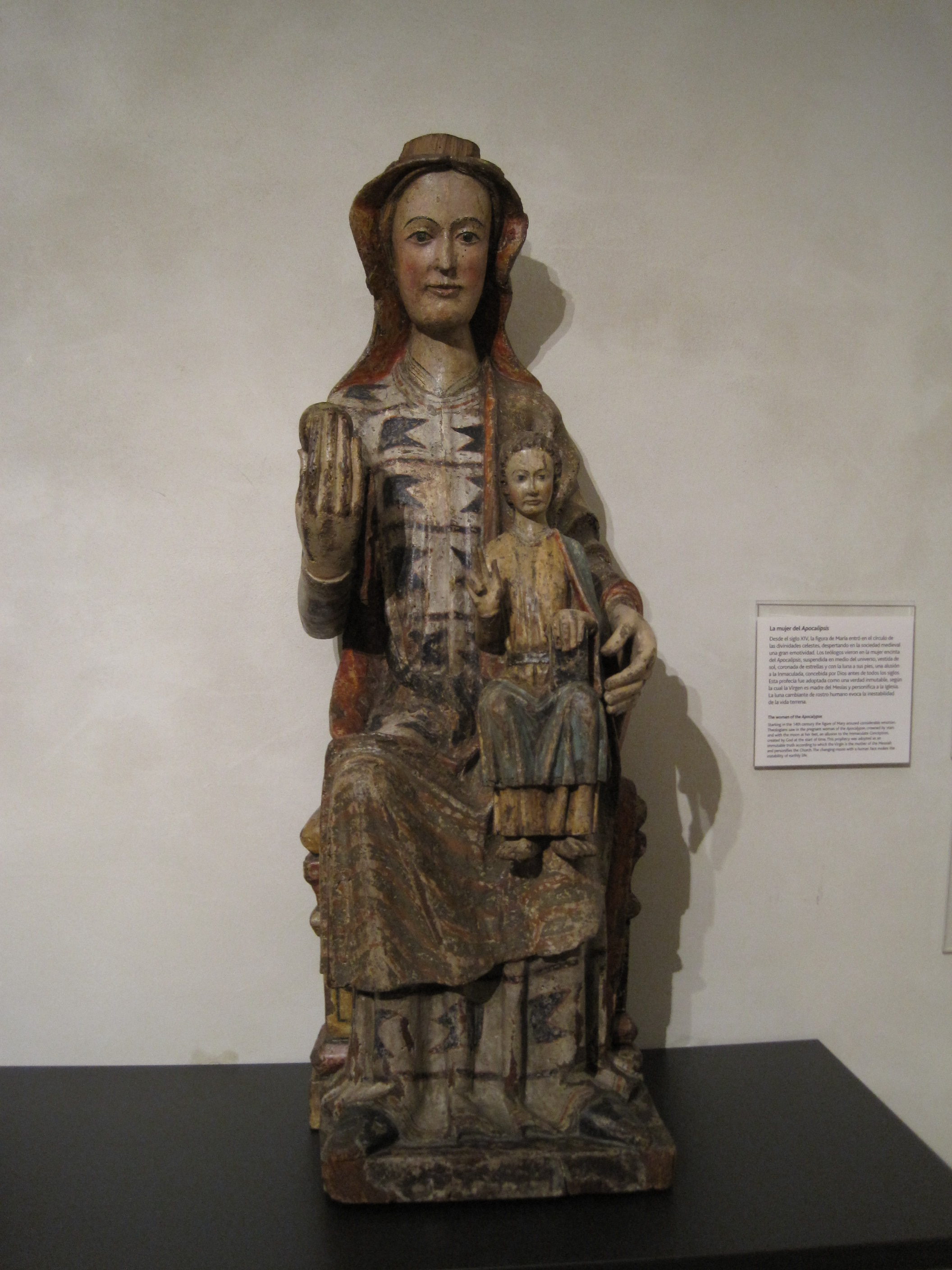
The Virgin with the child, anonymous, Castilian workshop, finally of the 13th century.

=== 15th century ===
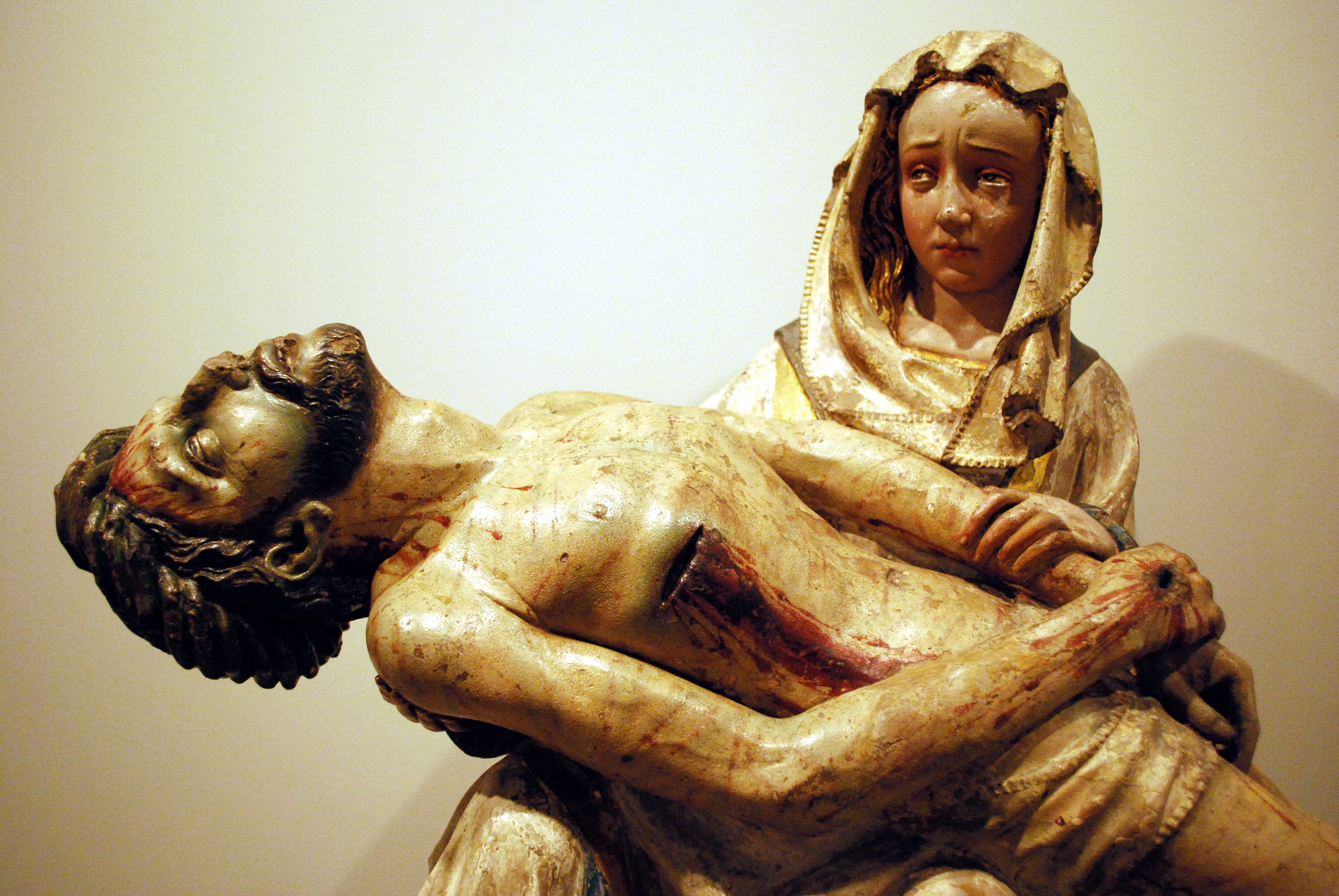
Pity, anonymous (made in Germany), 1406-1415.

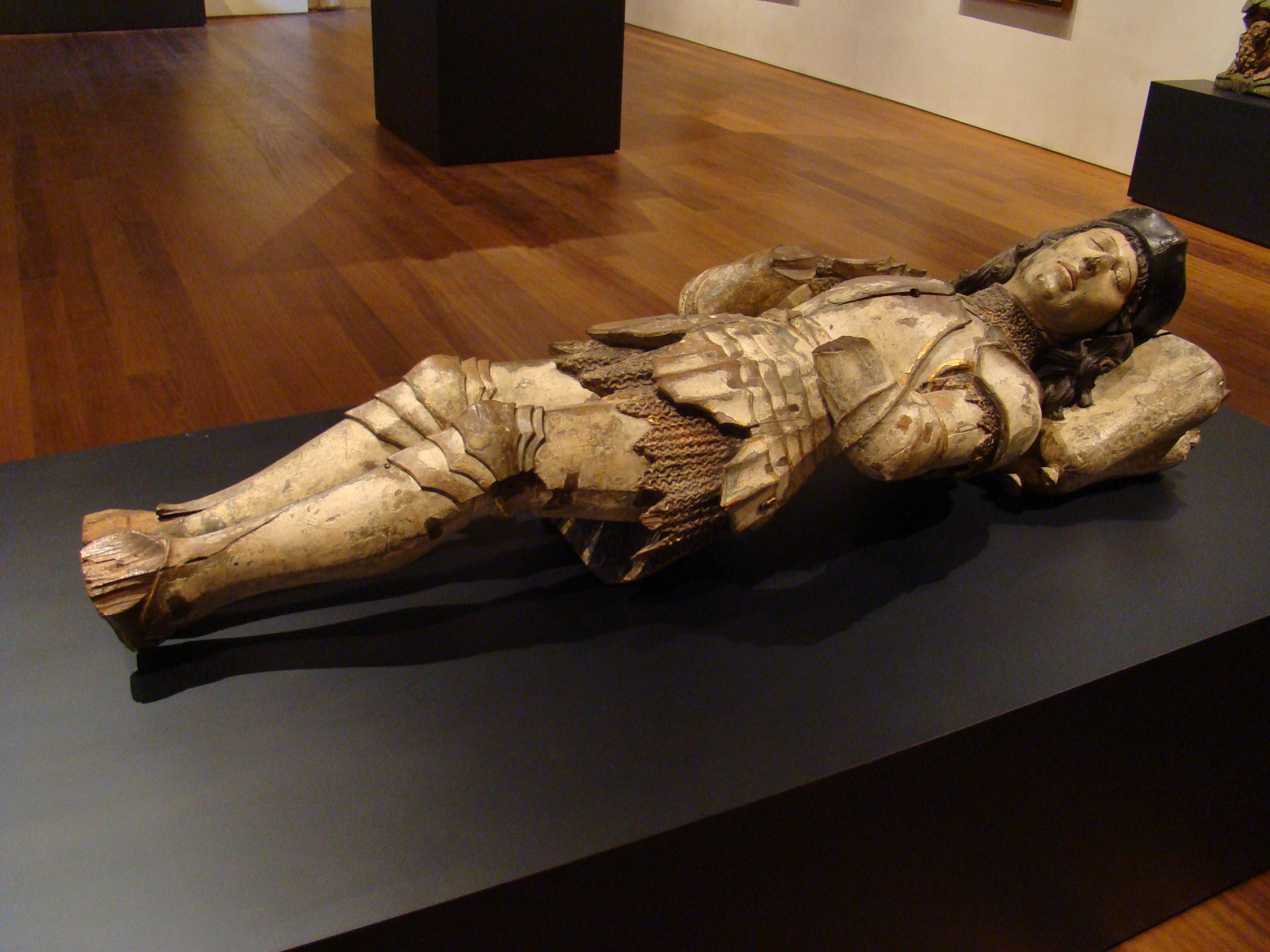
Funerary Portrait of Luis Pimentel y Pacheco, anonymous, Lion workshop, 15th century.

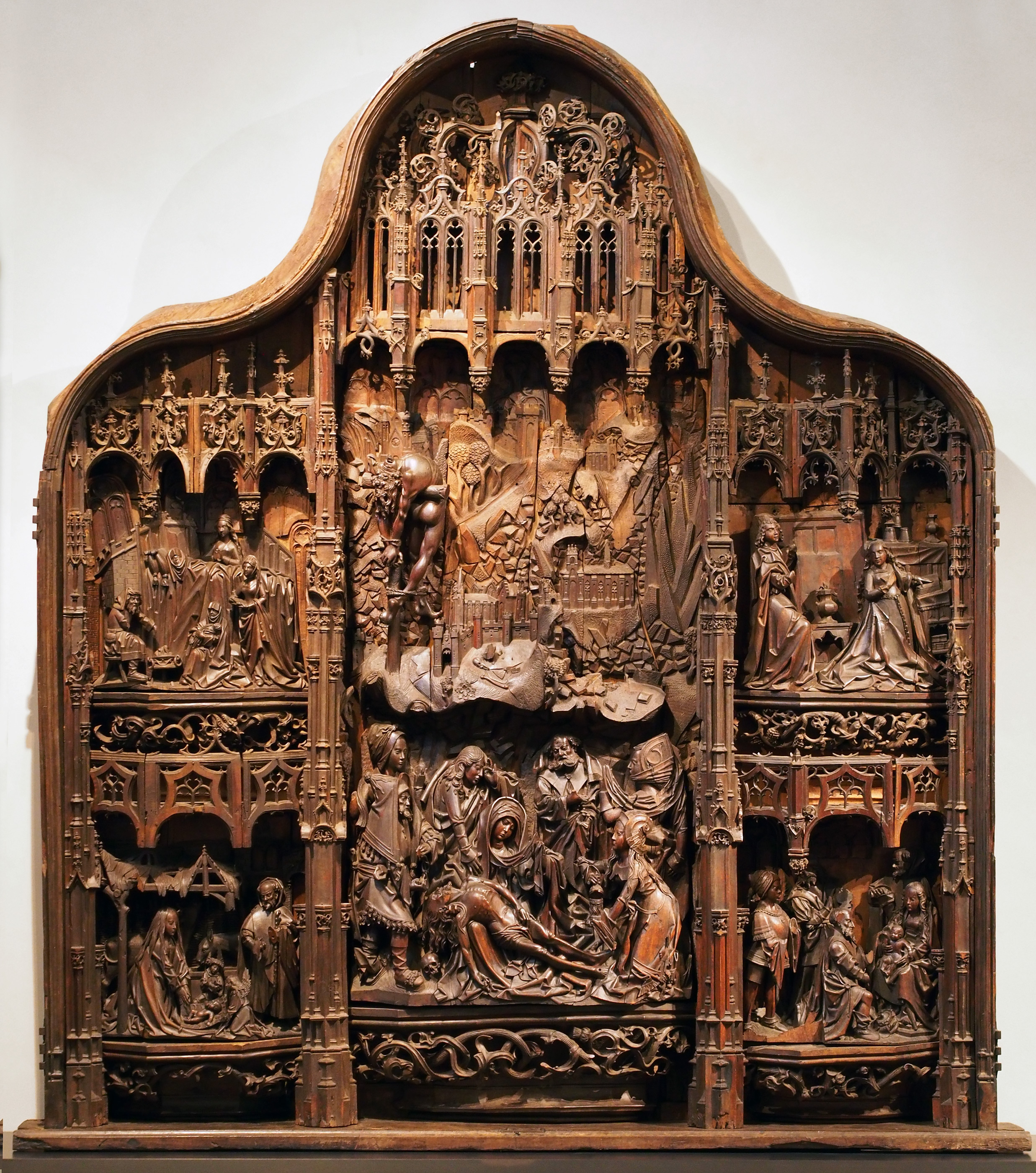
Altarpiece of the Virgin's life, anonymous, Antwerp workshop, over 1515.

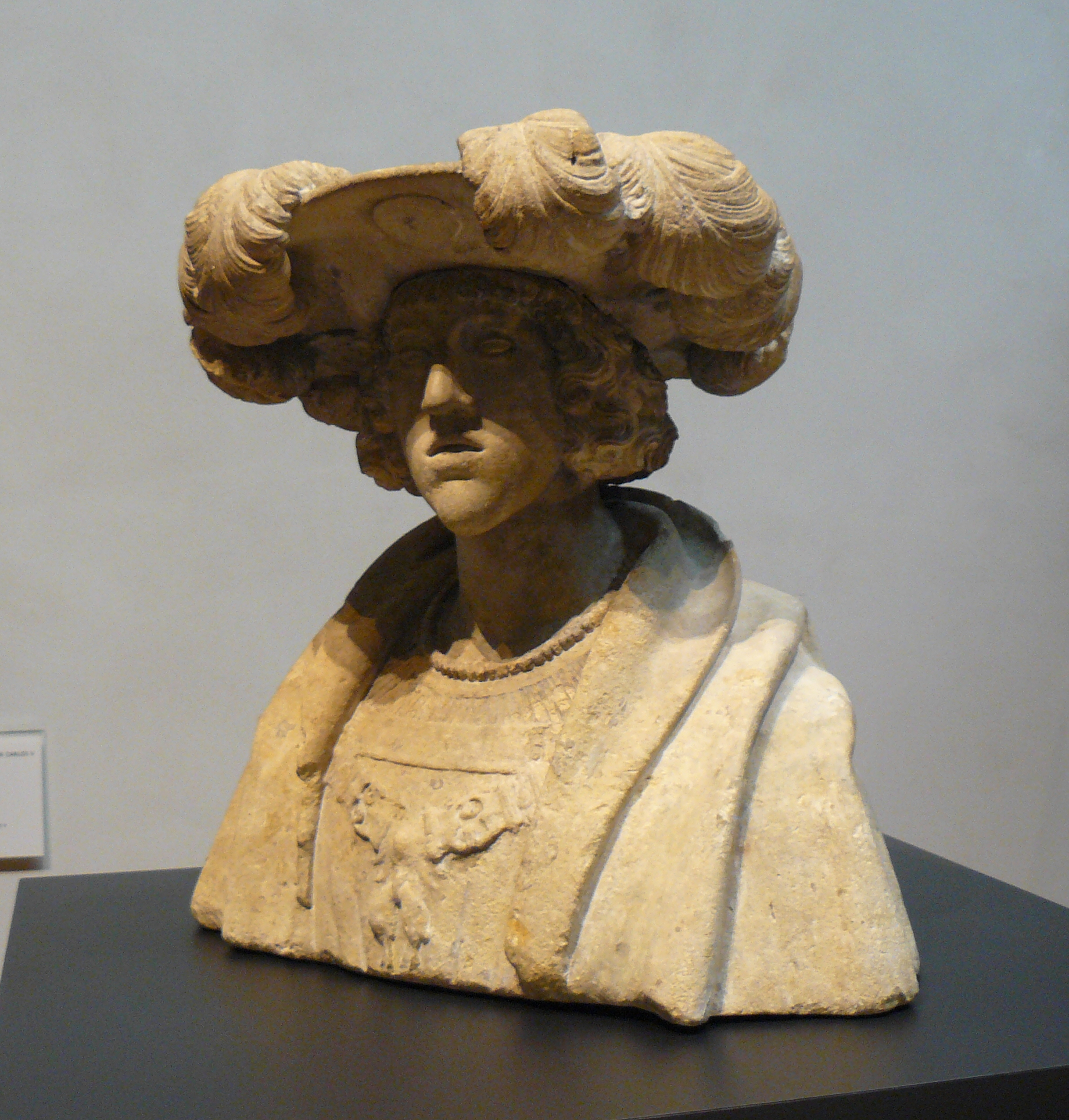
Bust of emperor Charles, young, anonymous, Flemish workshop, over 1520.

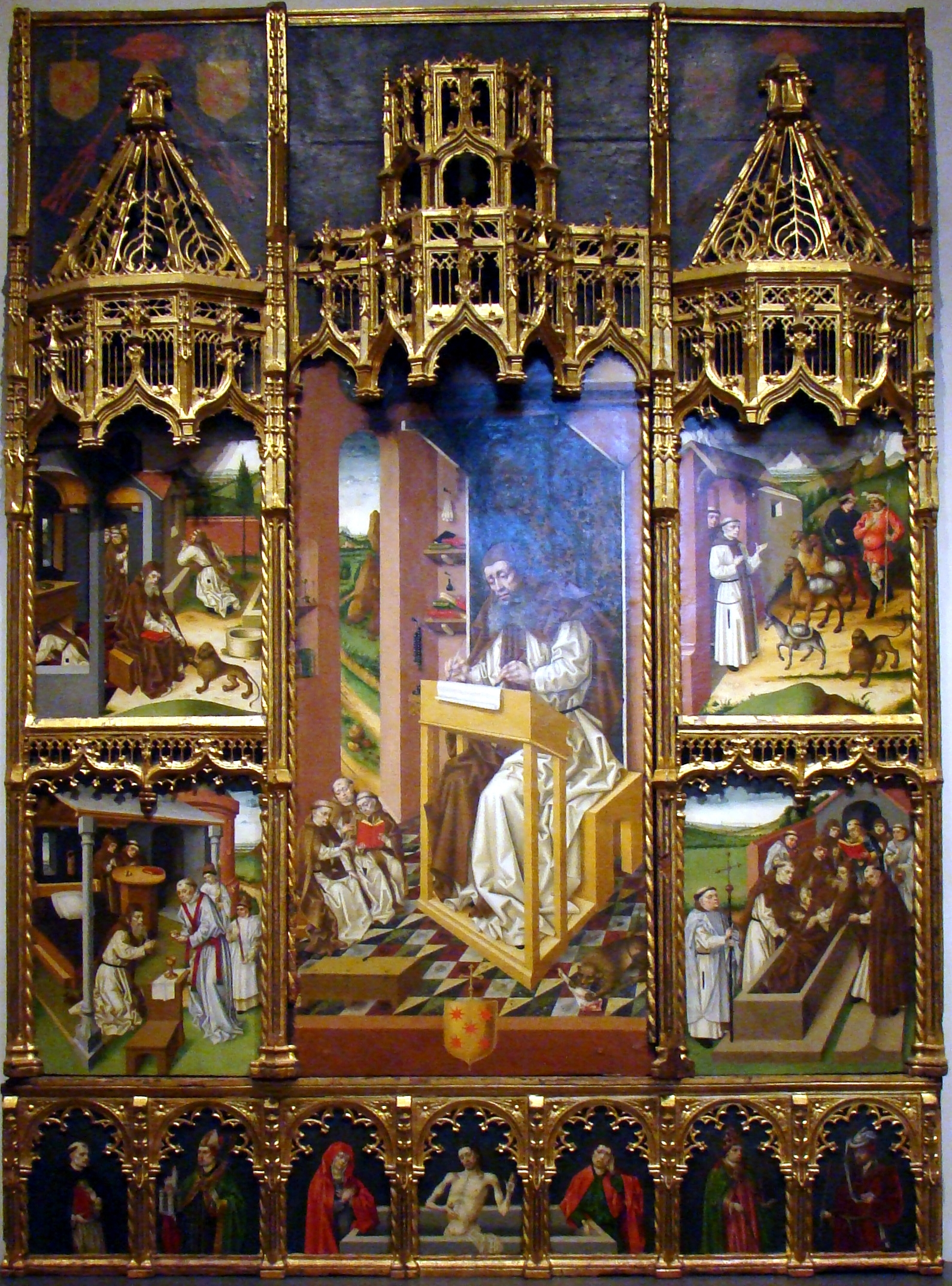
Altarpiece of St. Jerome by Jorge Inglés.

=== Renaissance ===
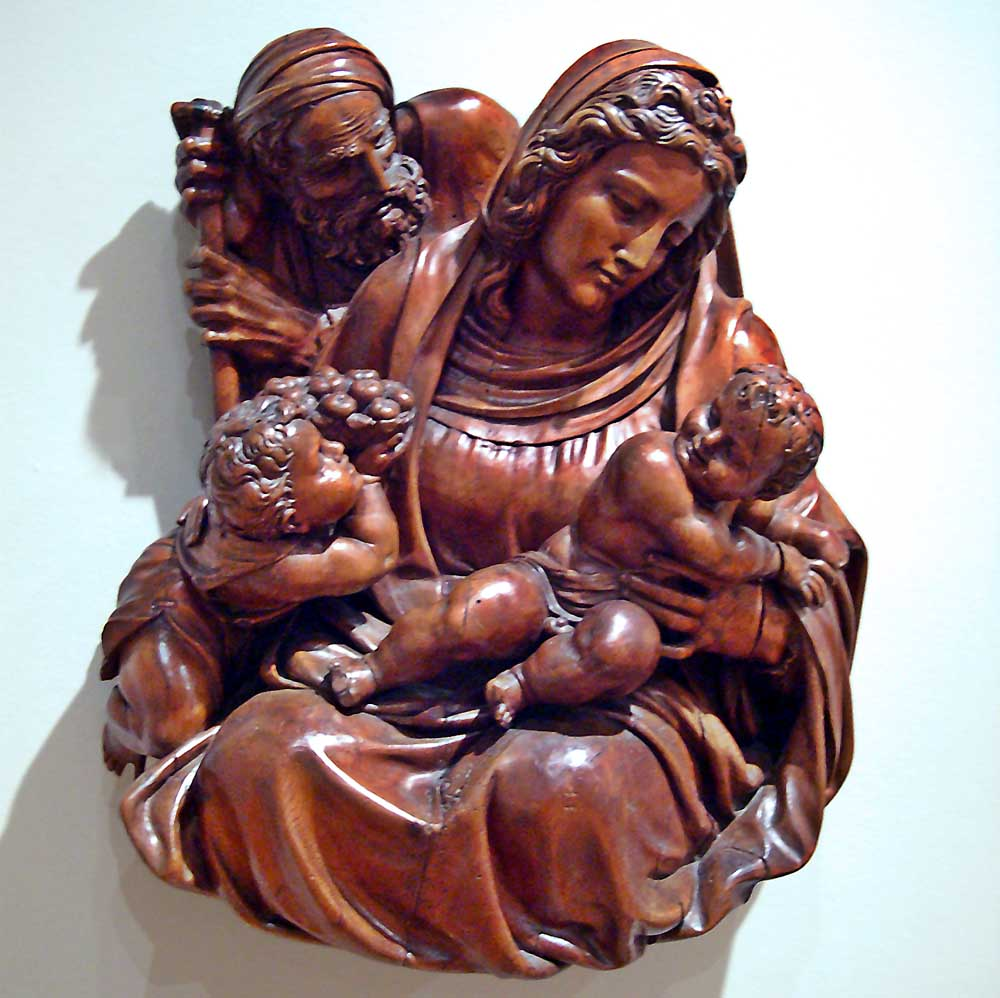
Holy family by Diego Siloe

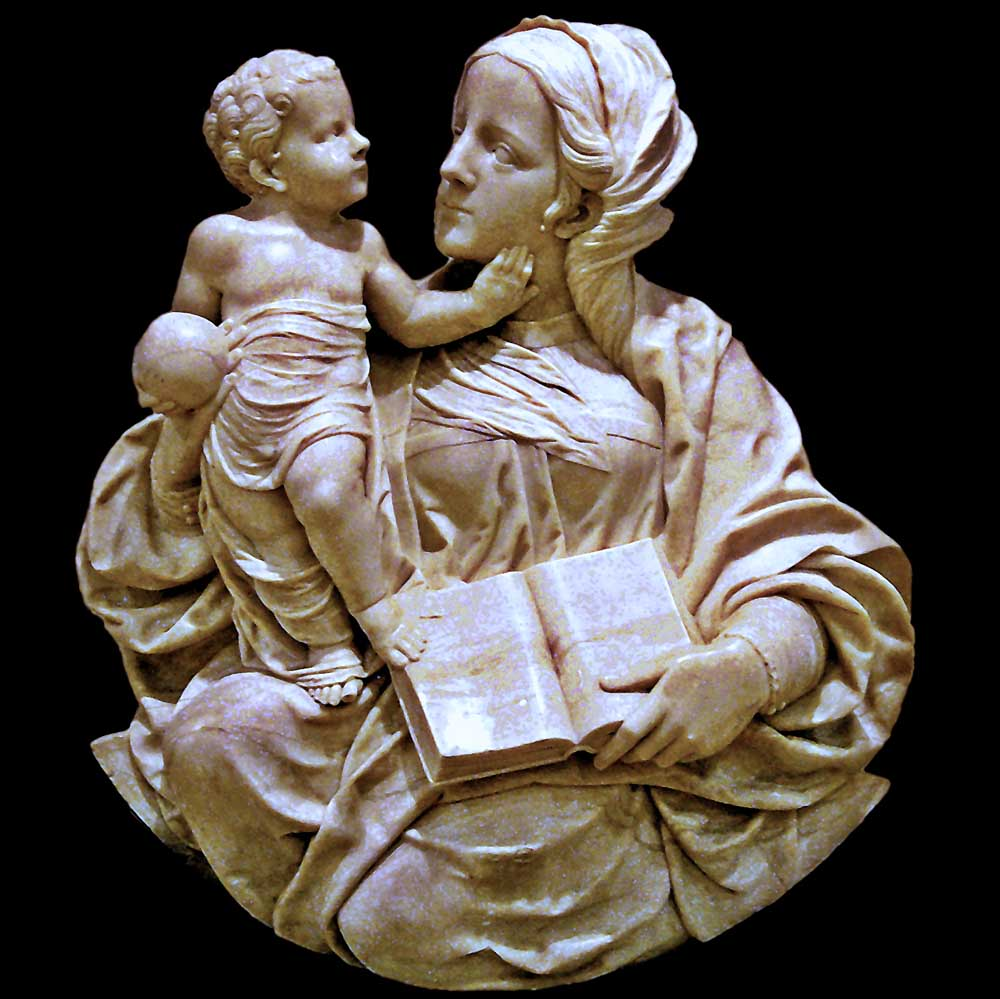
Virgin with child by Felipe Bigarny

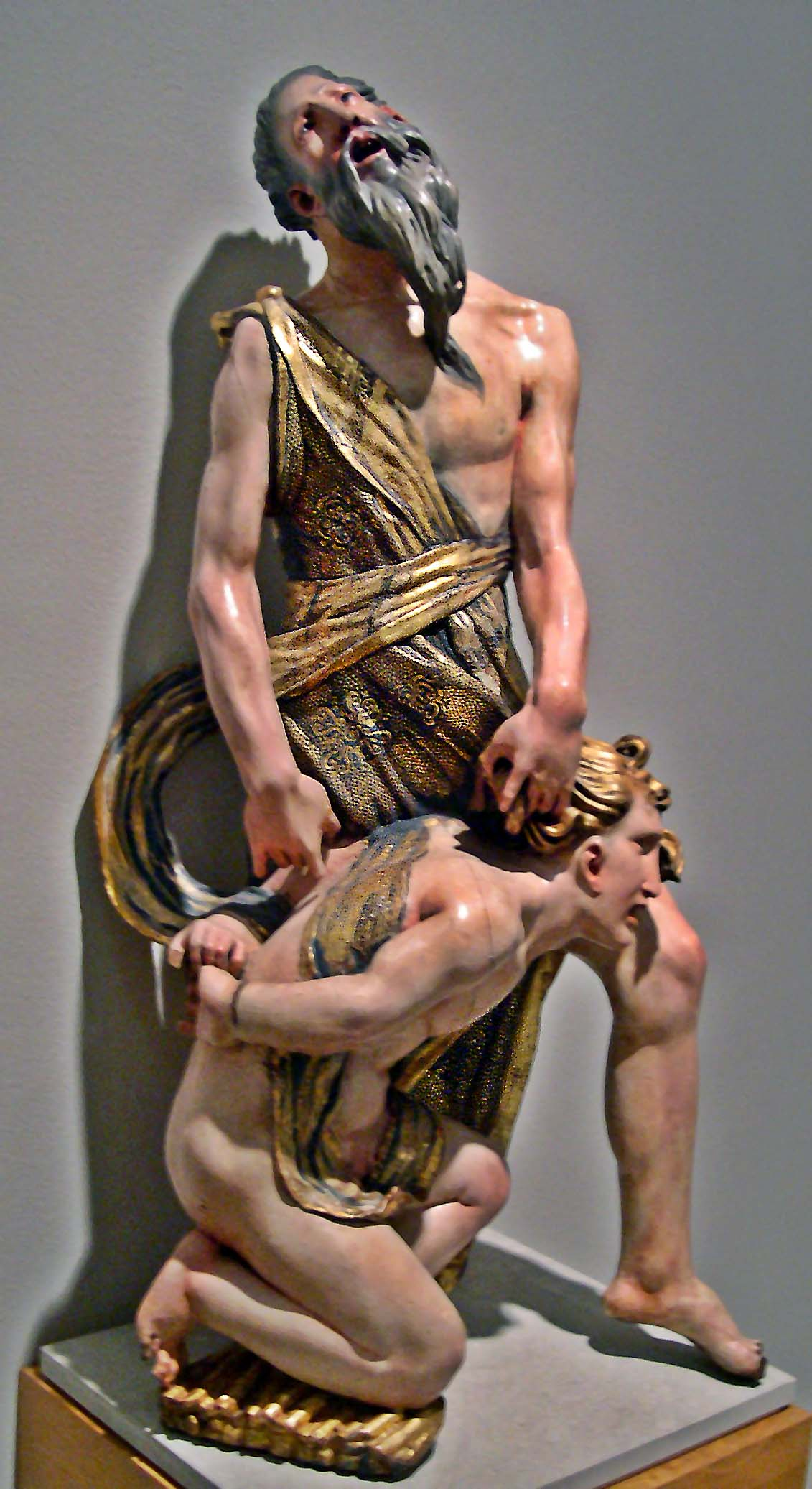
Sacrifice of Isaac by Alonso Berruguete

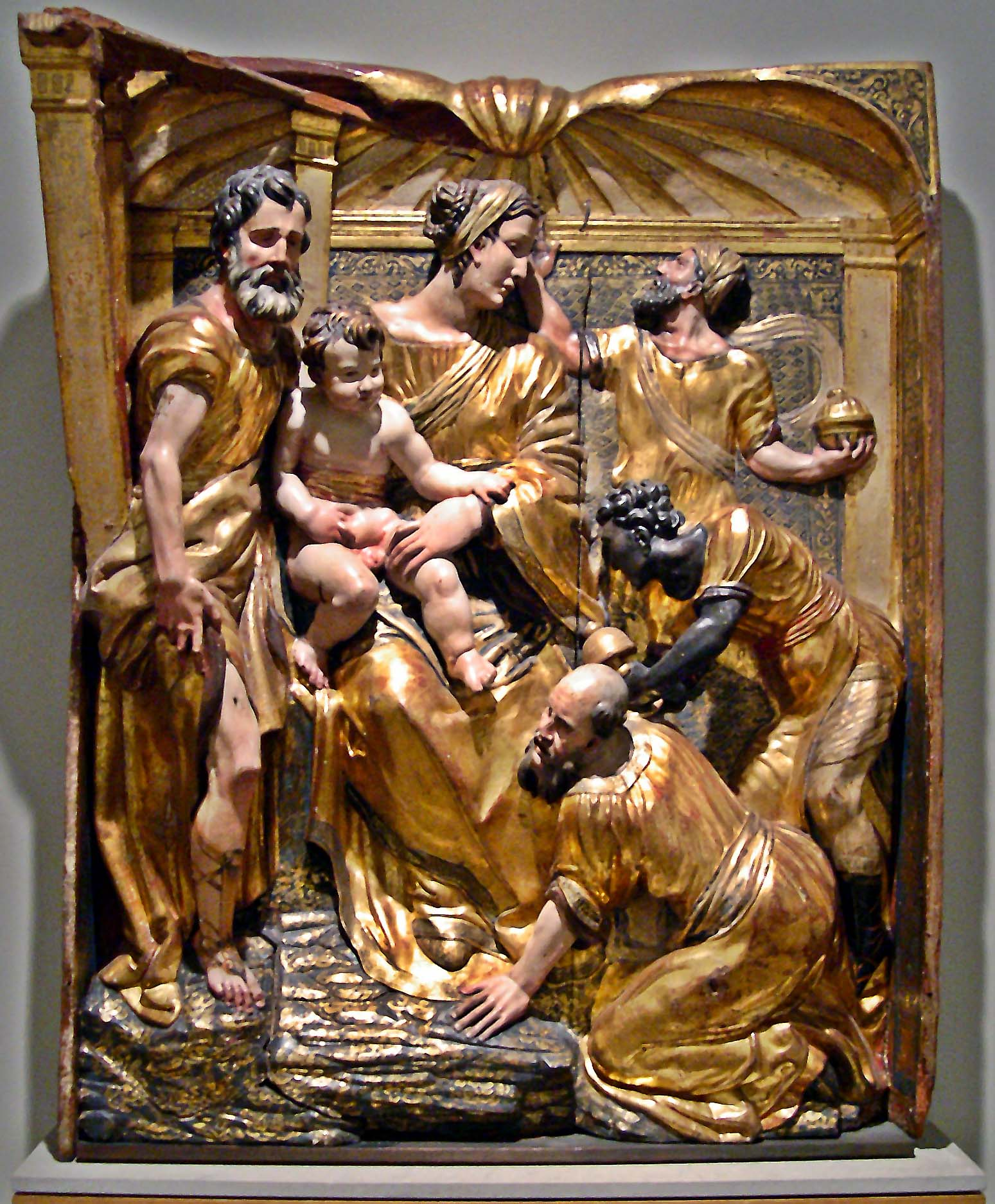
Adoration of the Magi by Alonso Berruguete

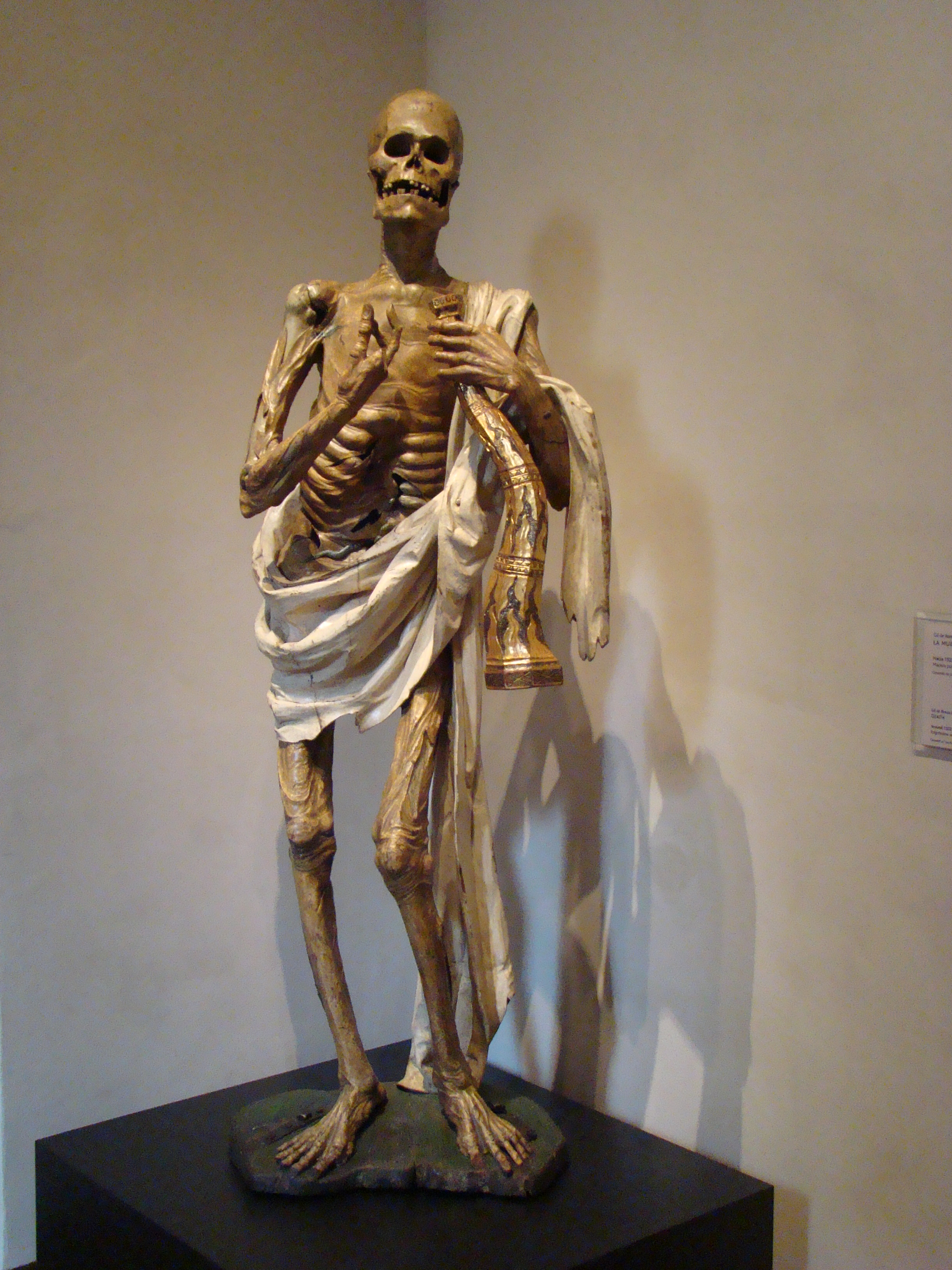
Death por Gil de Ronza, 1523.

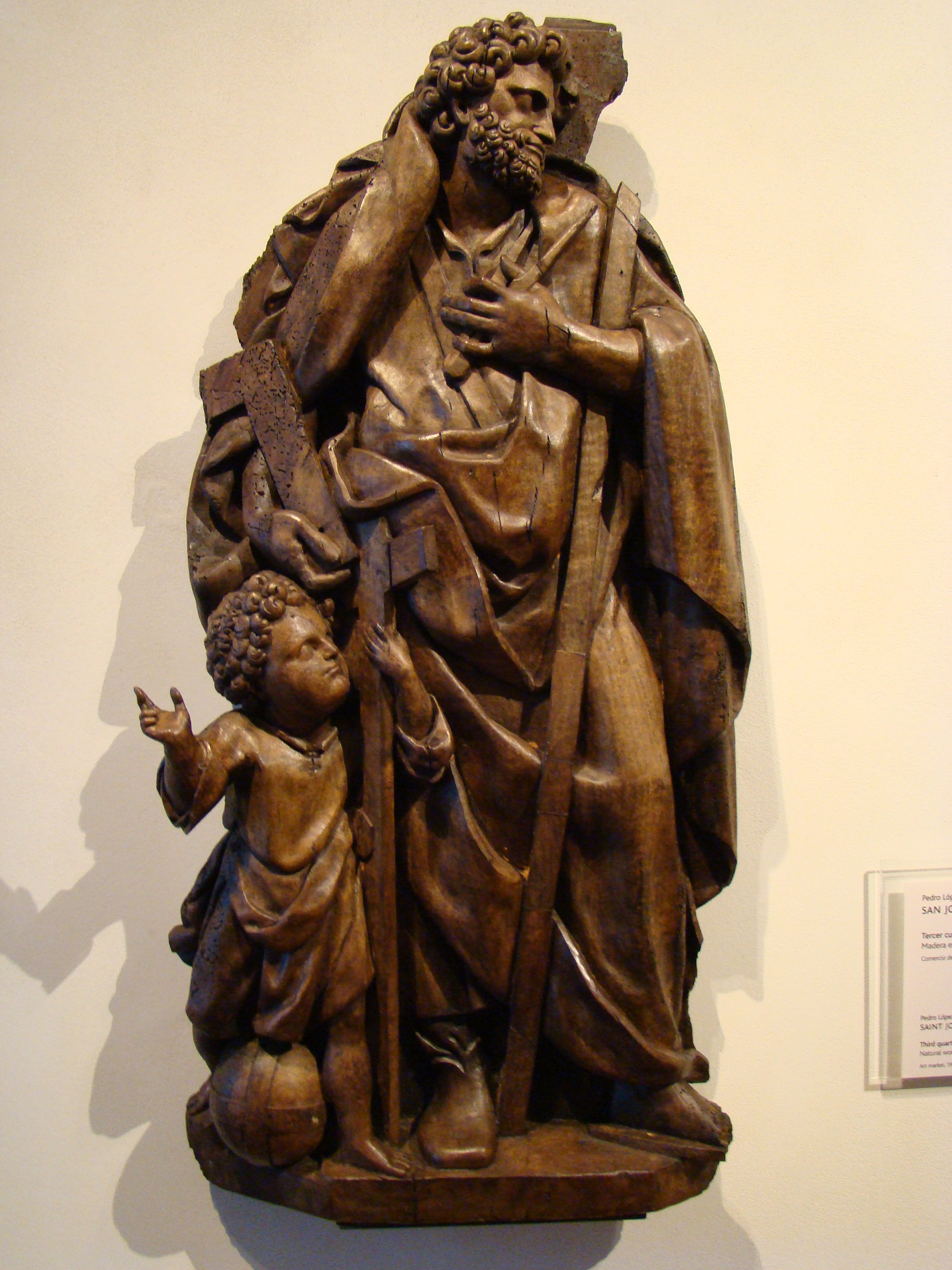
San José with the child by Pedro López de Gámiz (finally of 16th century)

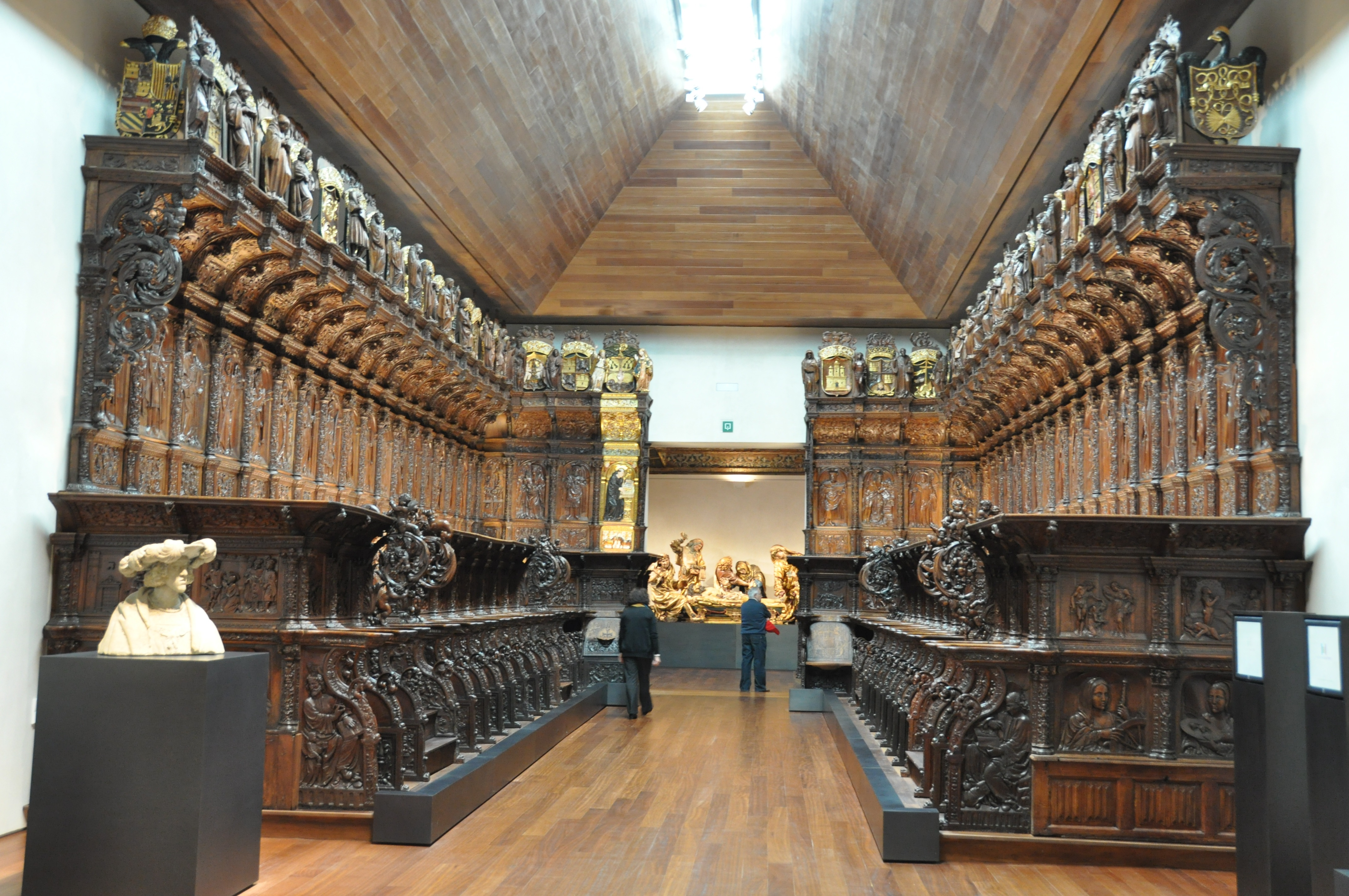
Old choir stalls under of the church of San Benito de Valladolid

Juan de Juni

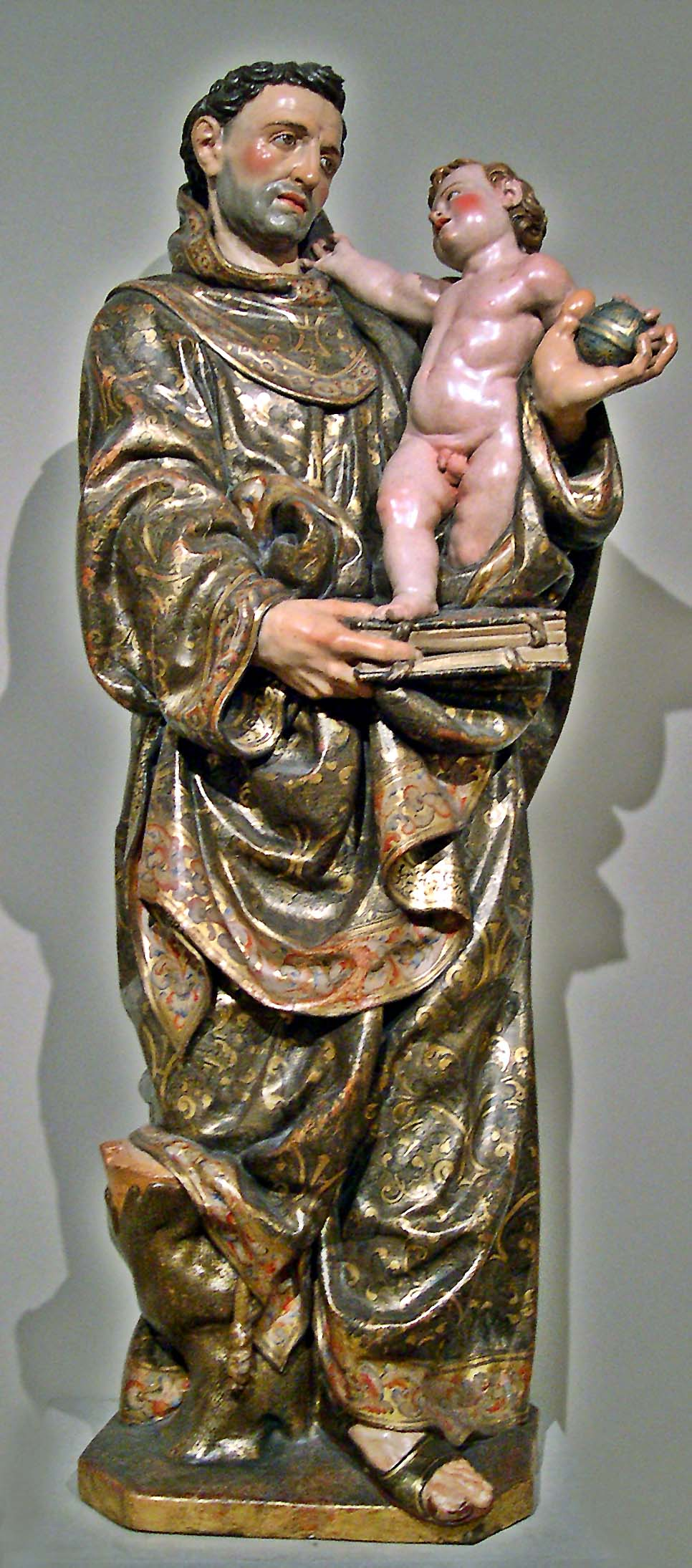
St. Anthony of Padua by Juan de Juni

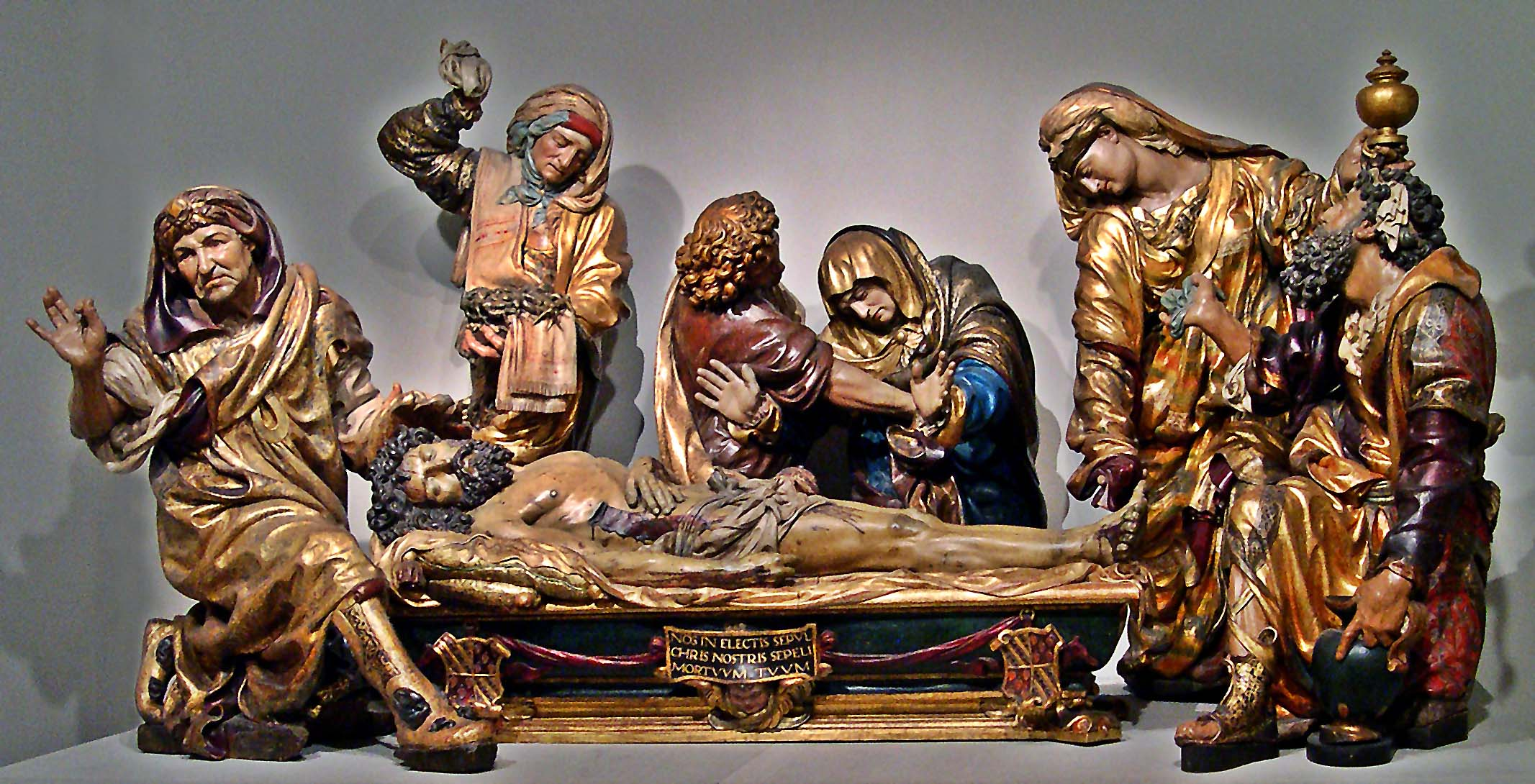
The Holy Burial by Juan de Juni

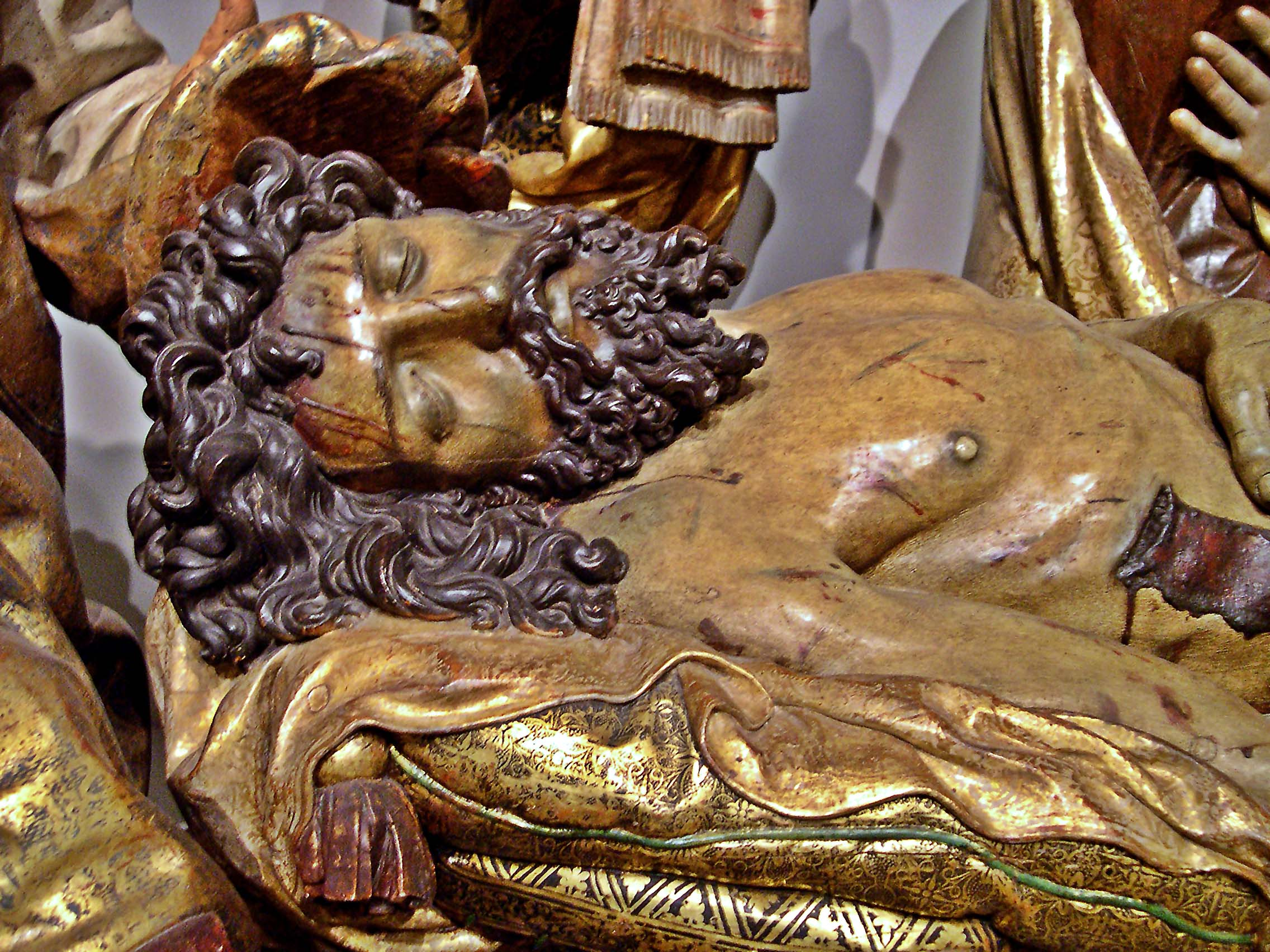
The Holy Burial (detail)

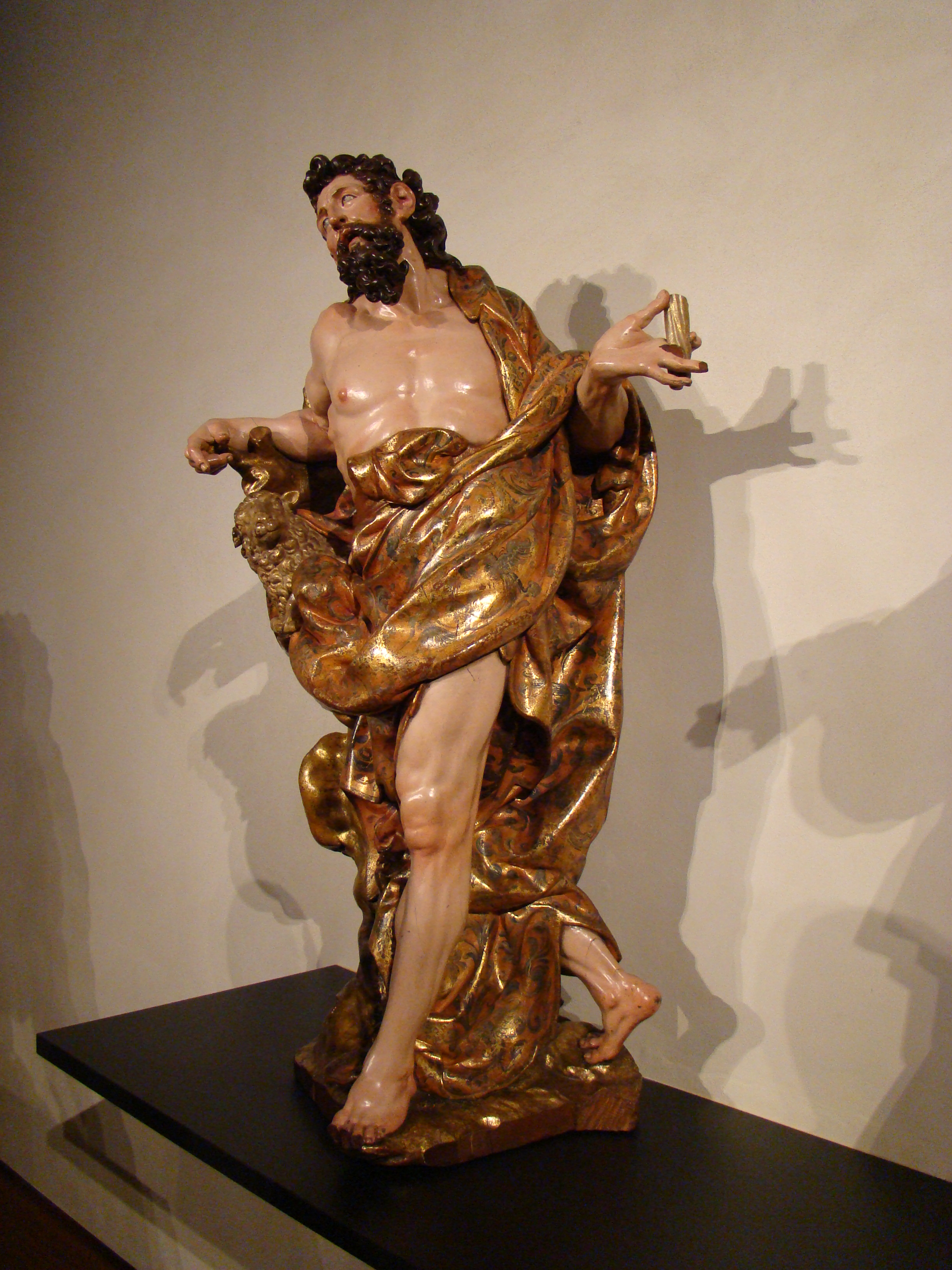
Saint John the Baptist by Juan de Juni

=== Baroque ===
Gregorio Fernández

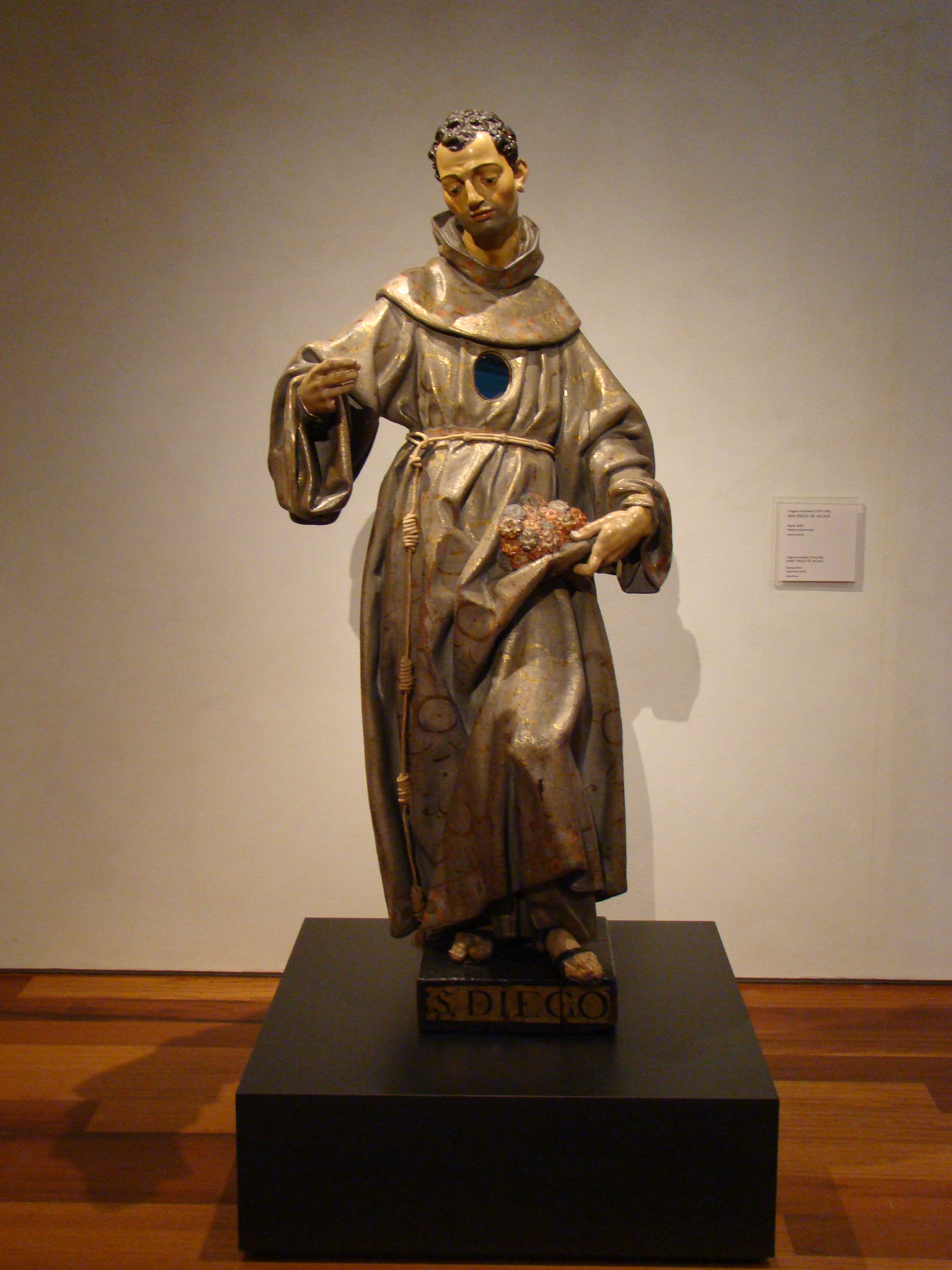
Gregorio Fernández: Saint Diego of Alcalá, 1605.

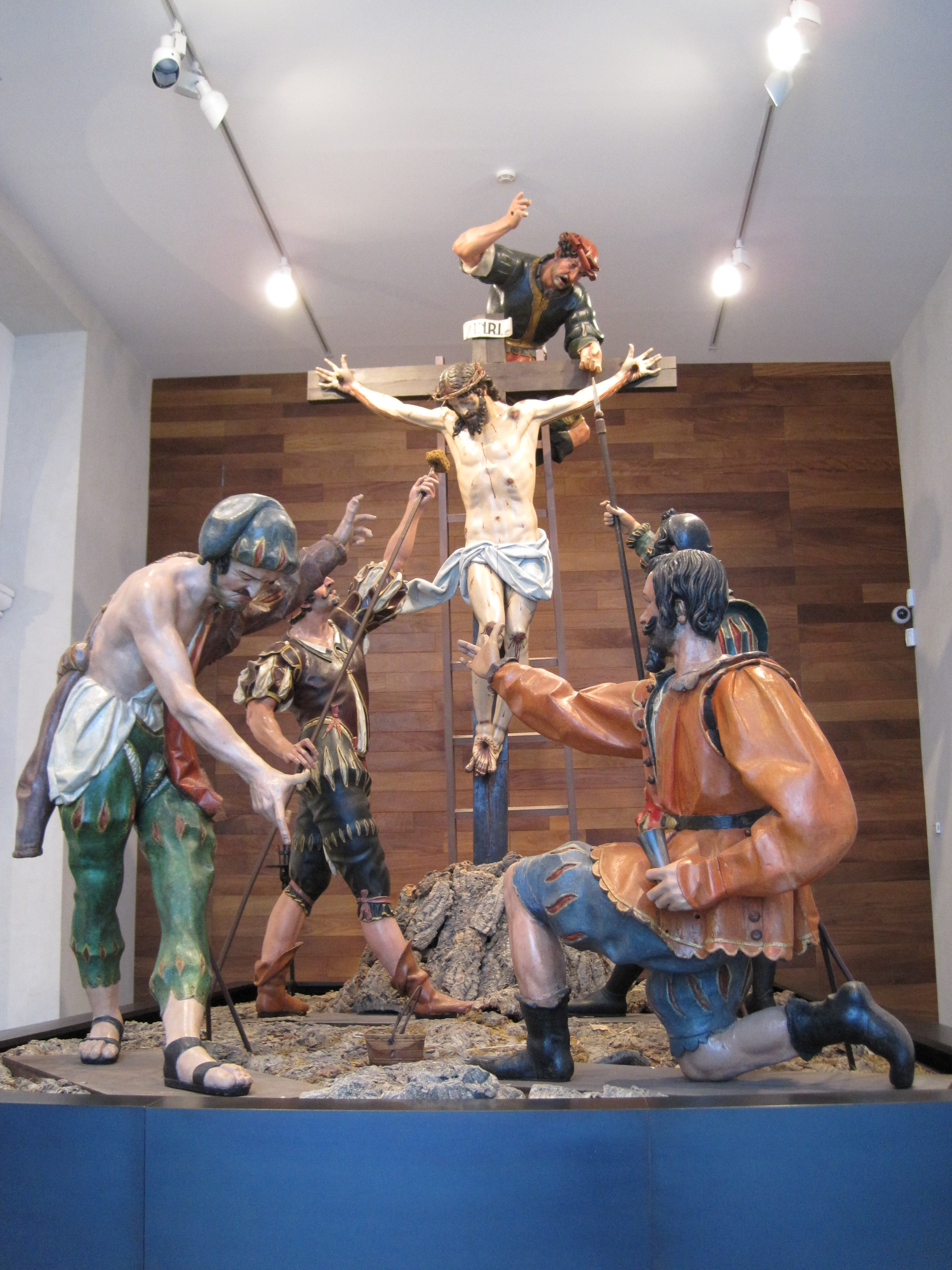
Gregorio Fernández: Thirst i have, 1612-1616.

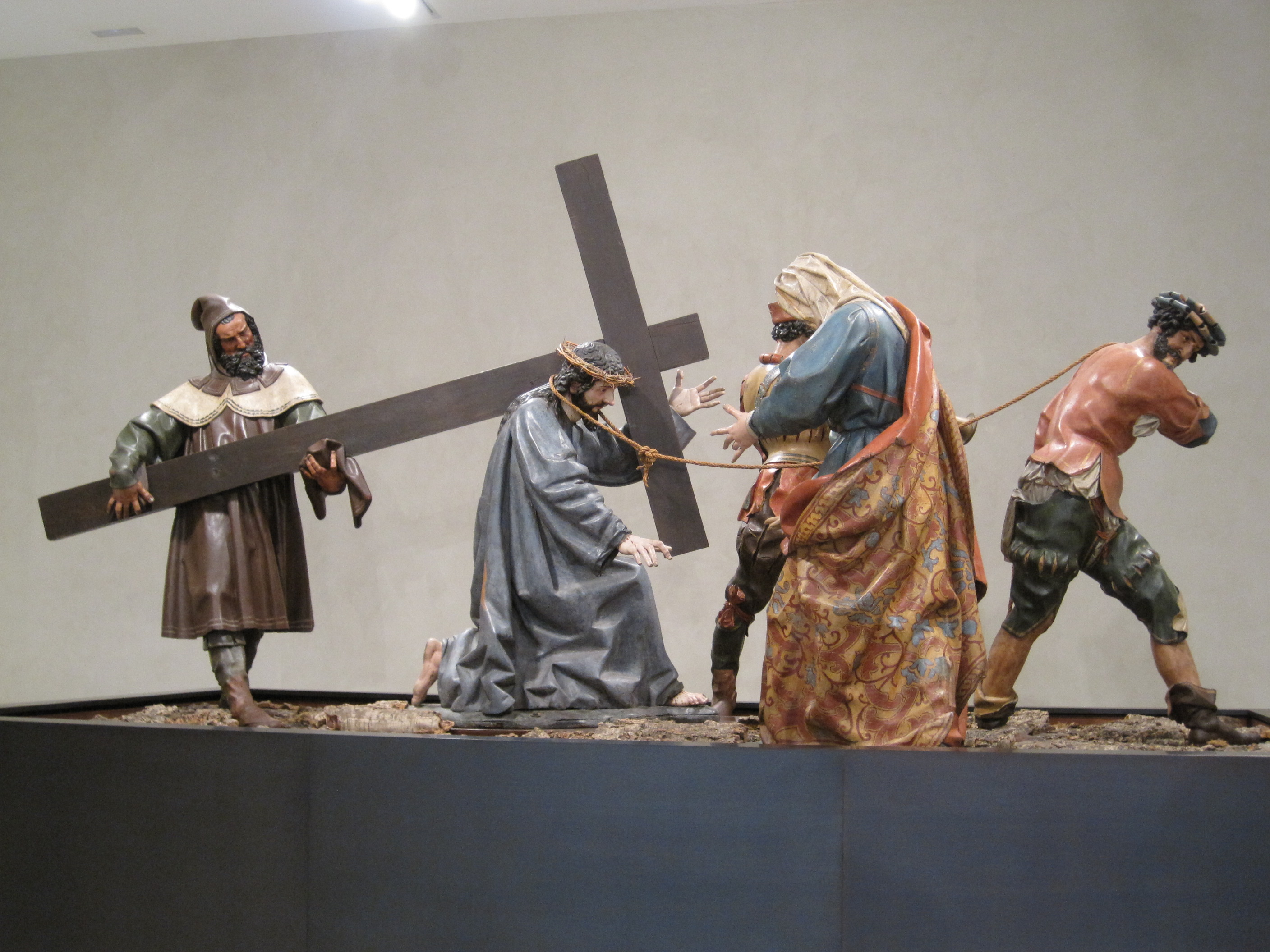
Gregorio Fernández: Road to Calvary, 1614.

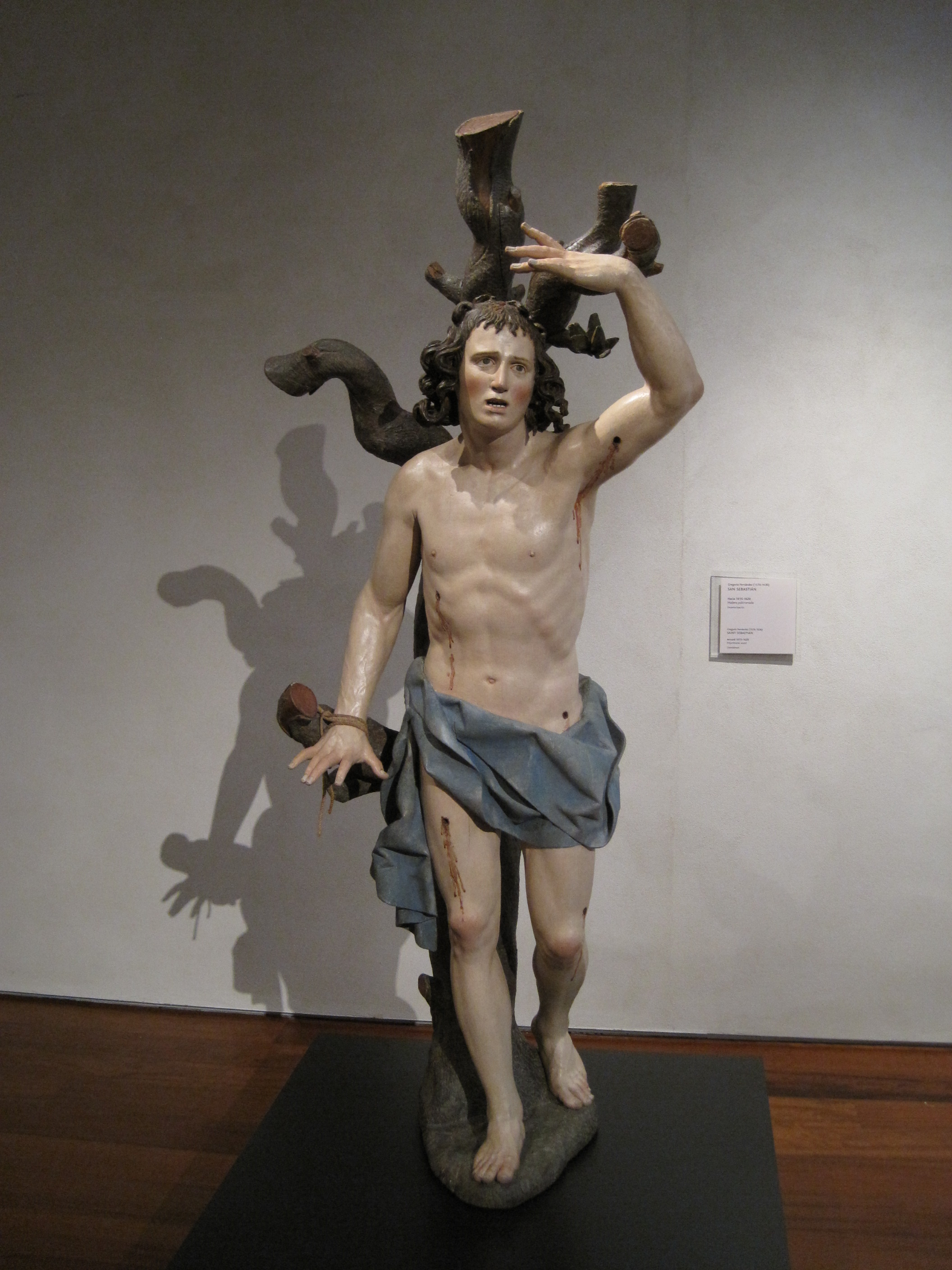
Gregorio Fernández: Saint Sebastián , 1615-1620.

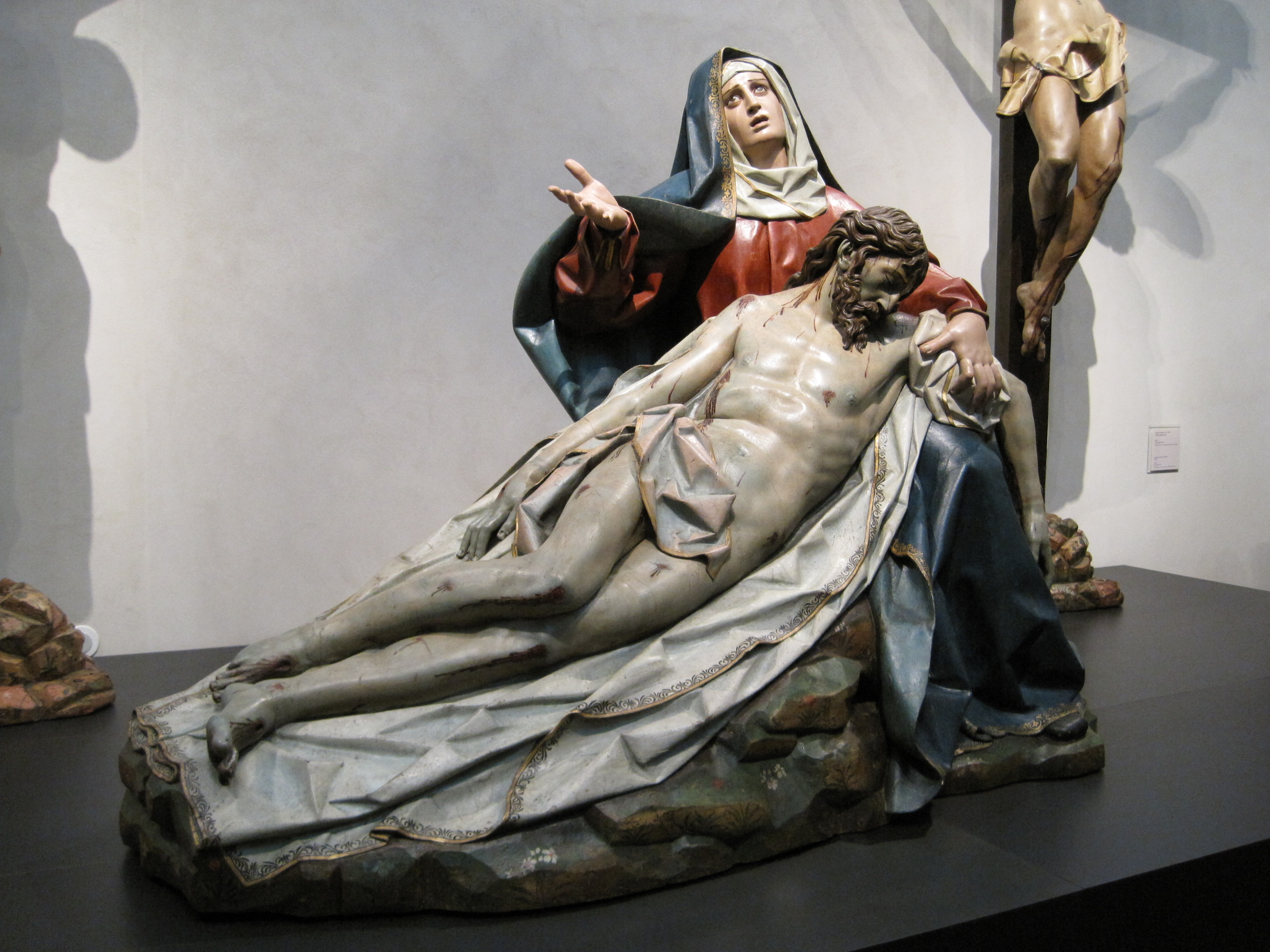
Gregorio Fernández: The Sixth Anguish (1616-1617).

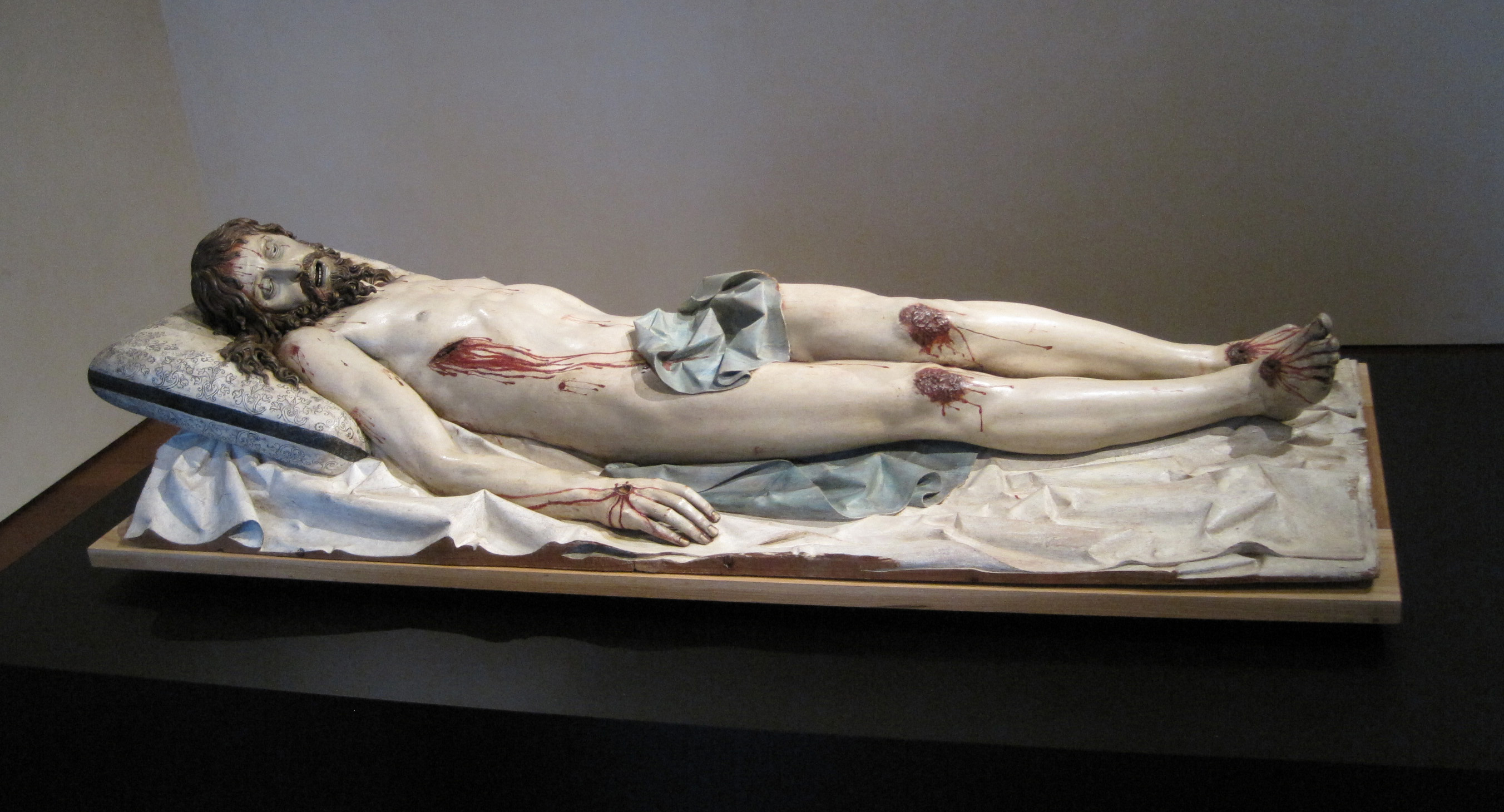
Gregorio Fernández: Lying Christ, 1627.

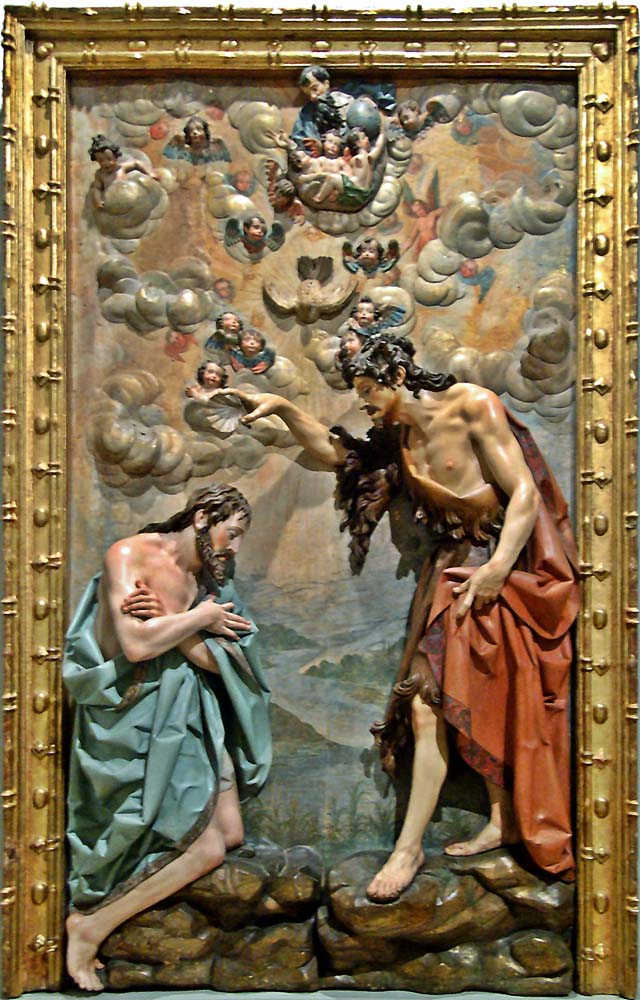
Gregorio Fernández: Baptism of Christ, 1630.

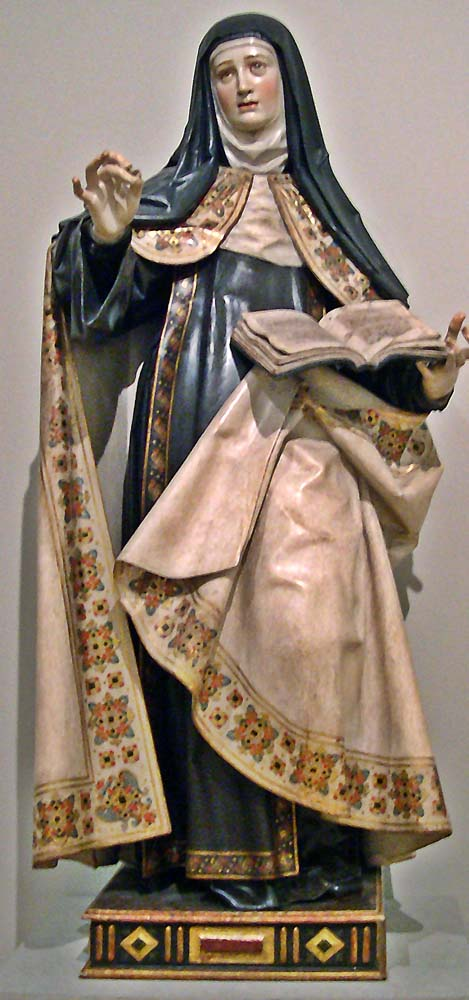
Gregorio Fernández: Saint Teresa of Jesus, 1624.
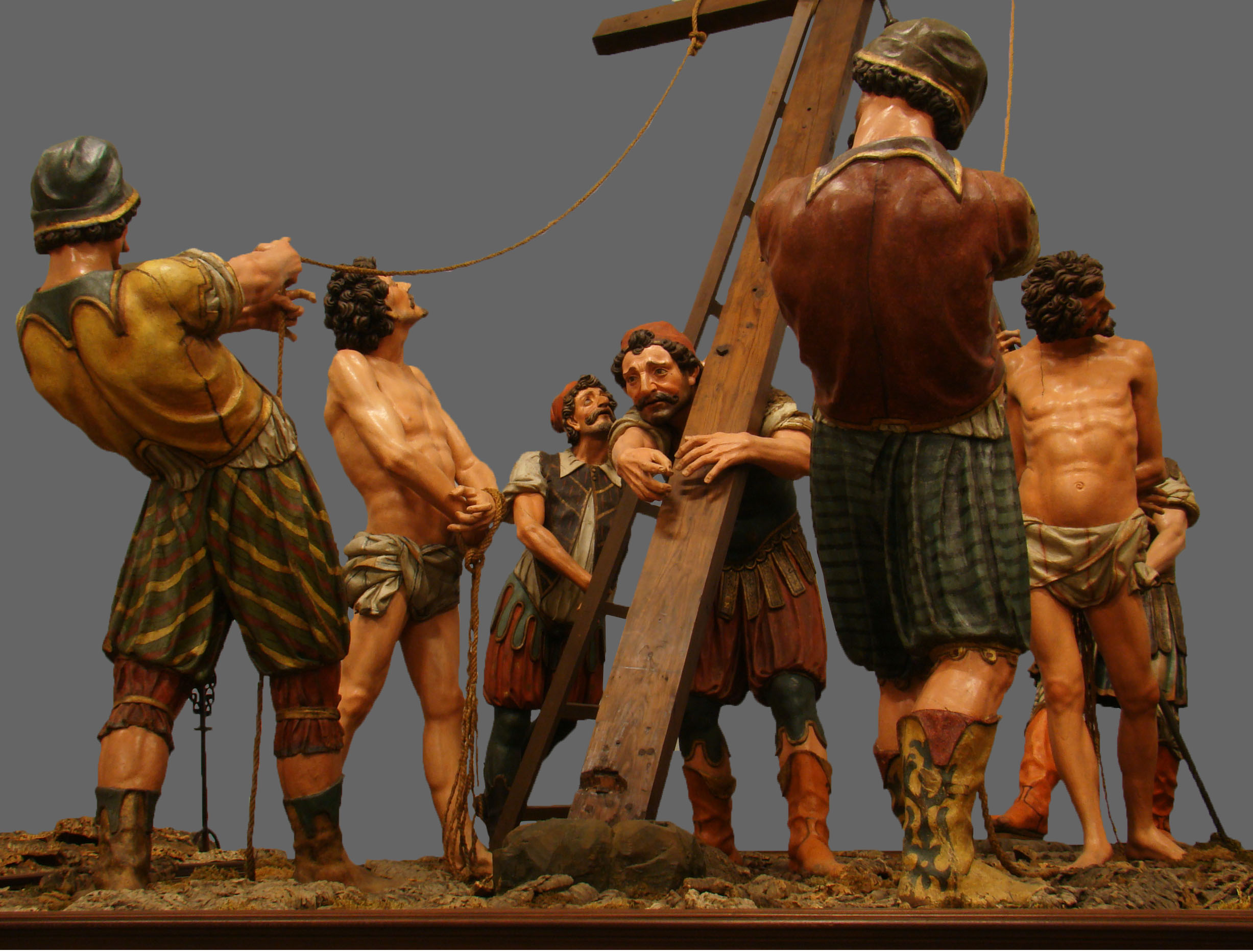
The elevation of the Cross by Francisco del Rincón, 1604.

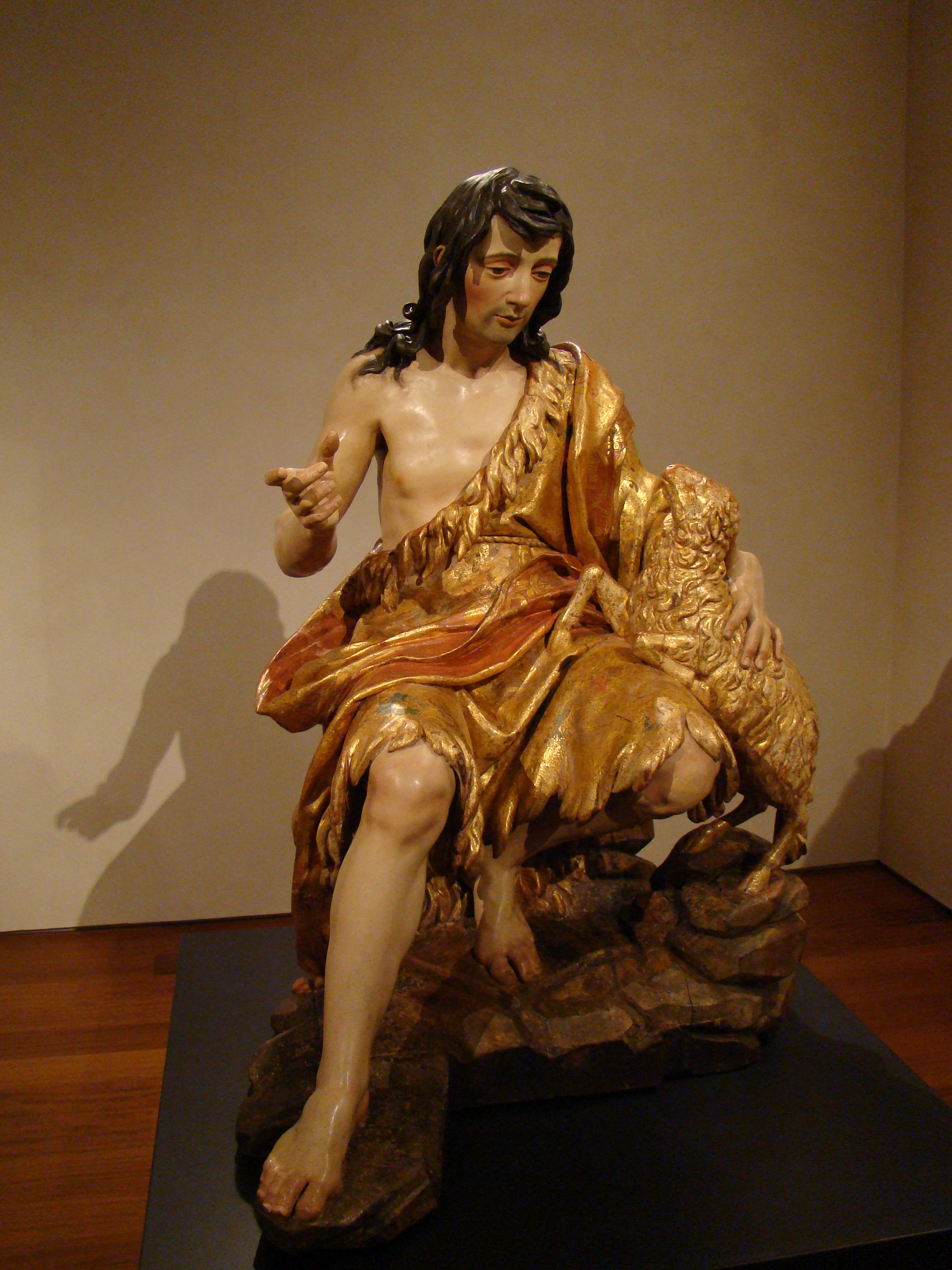
Saint John the Baptist by Alonso Cano, 1634.

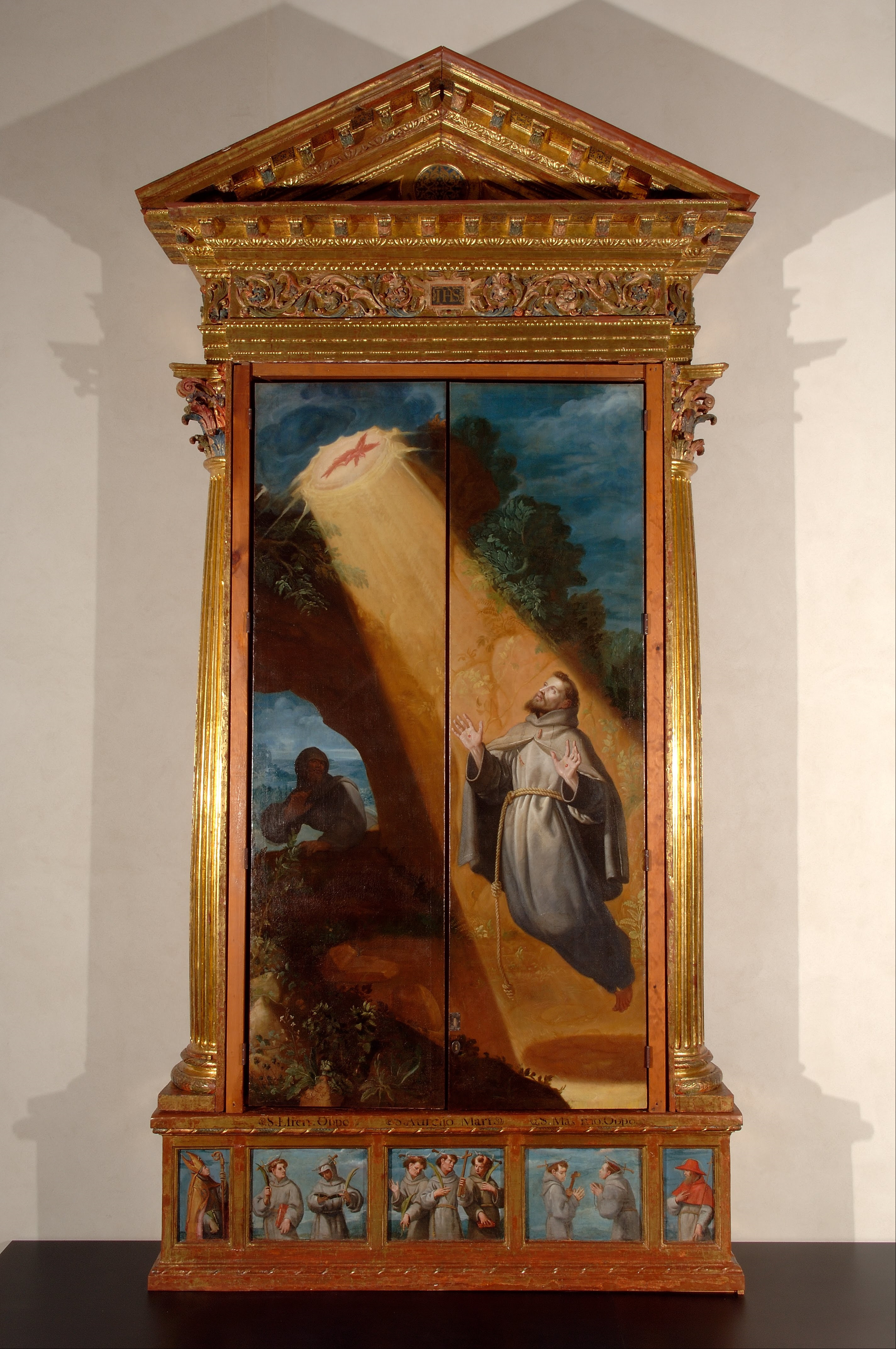
Reliquary Retables of San Diego by Bartolomé Carducho, 1604-1606.

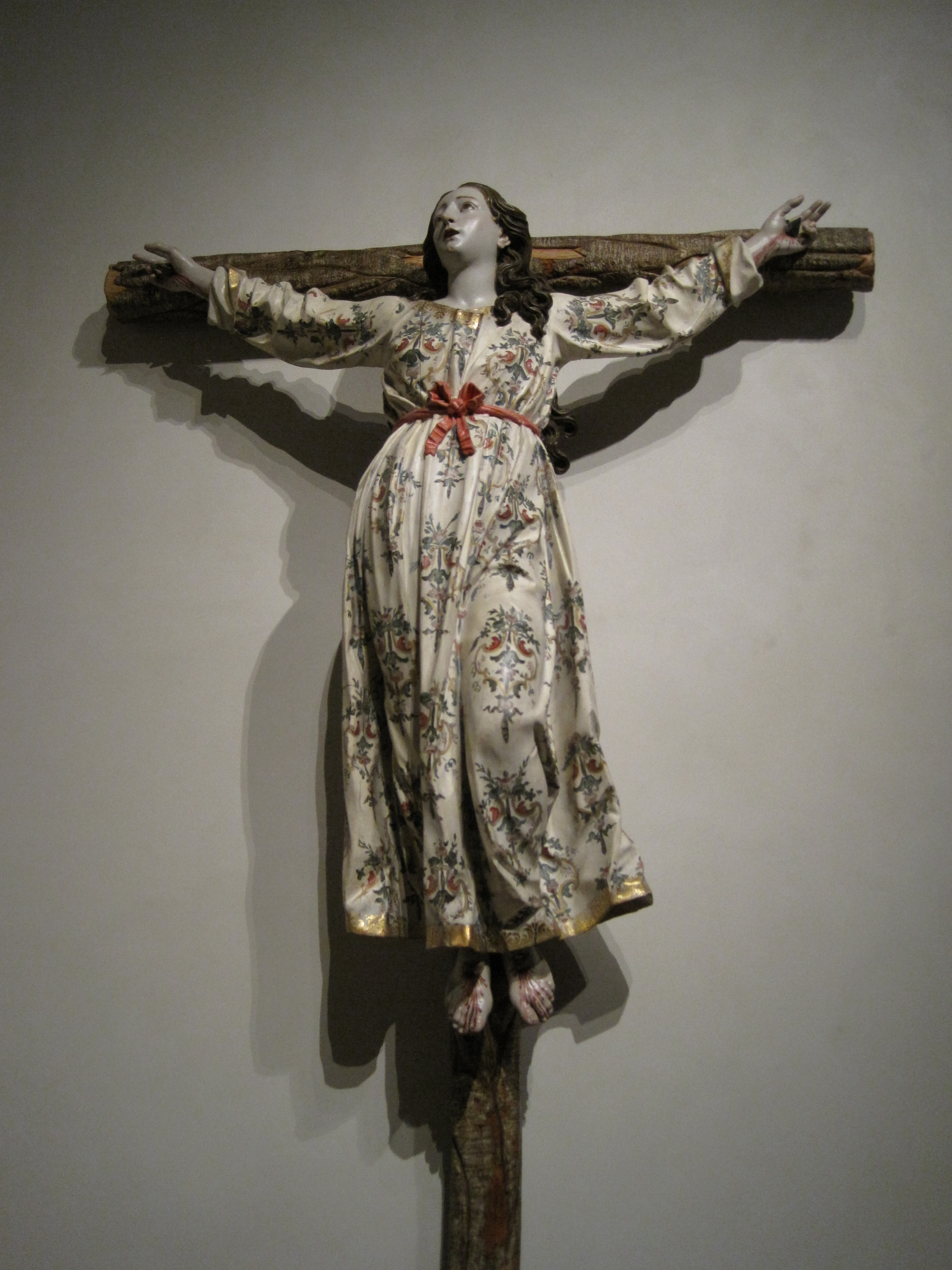
Saint Eulalia by Luis Salvador Carmona (half of 18th century).

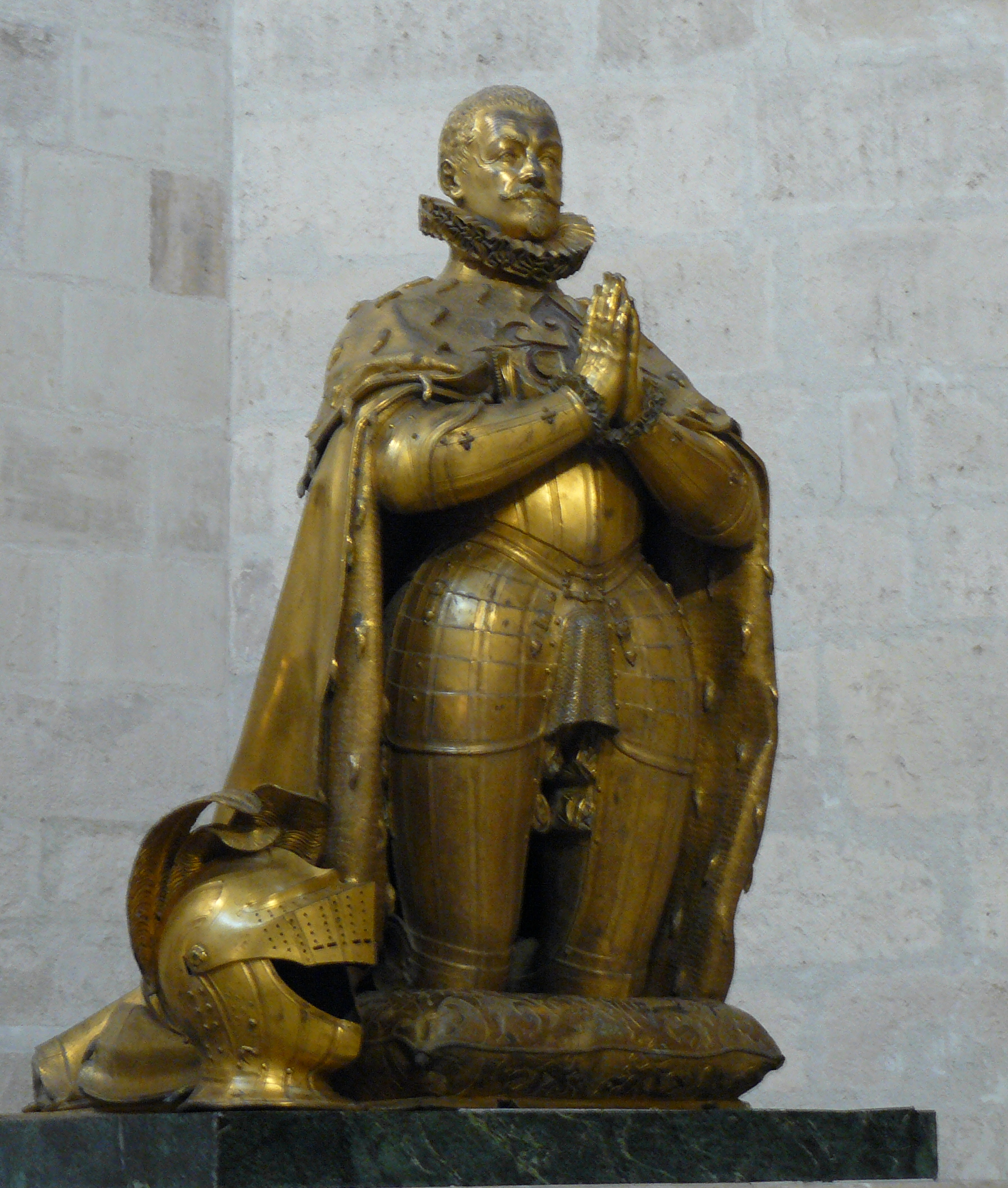
Statue of the Duke of Lerma

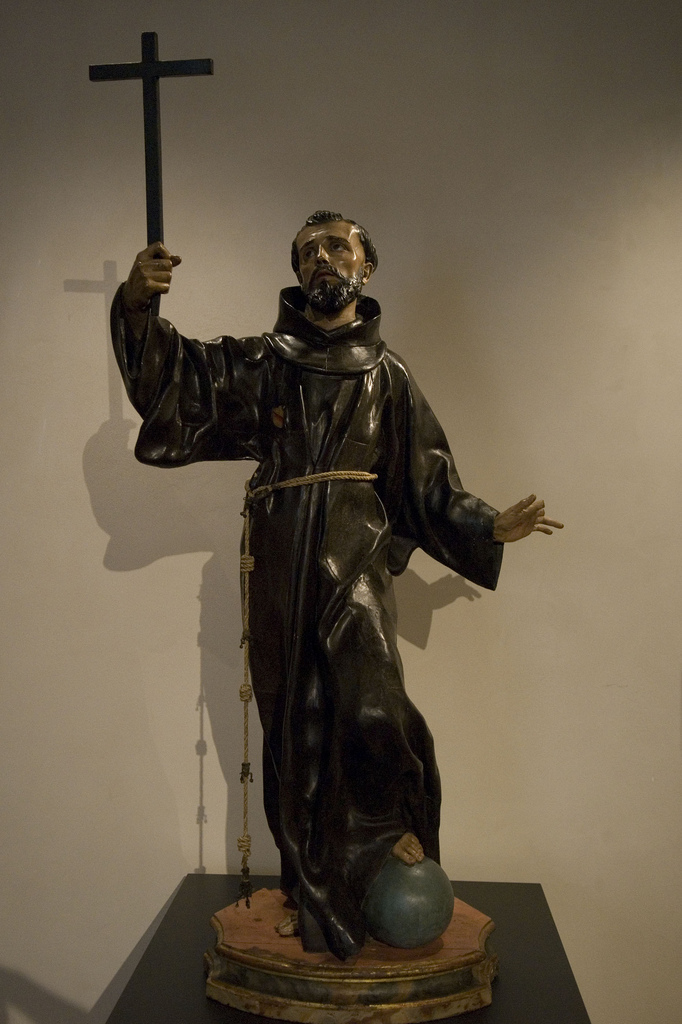
Saint Francis of Assisi by Francisco Salzillo, 18th century.

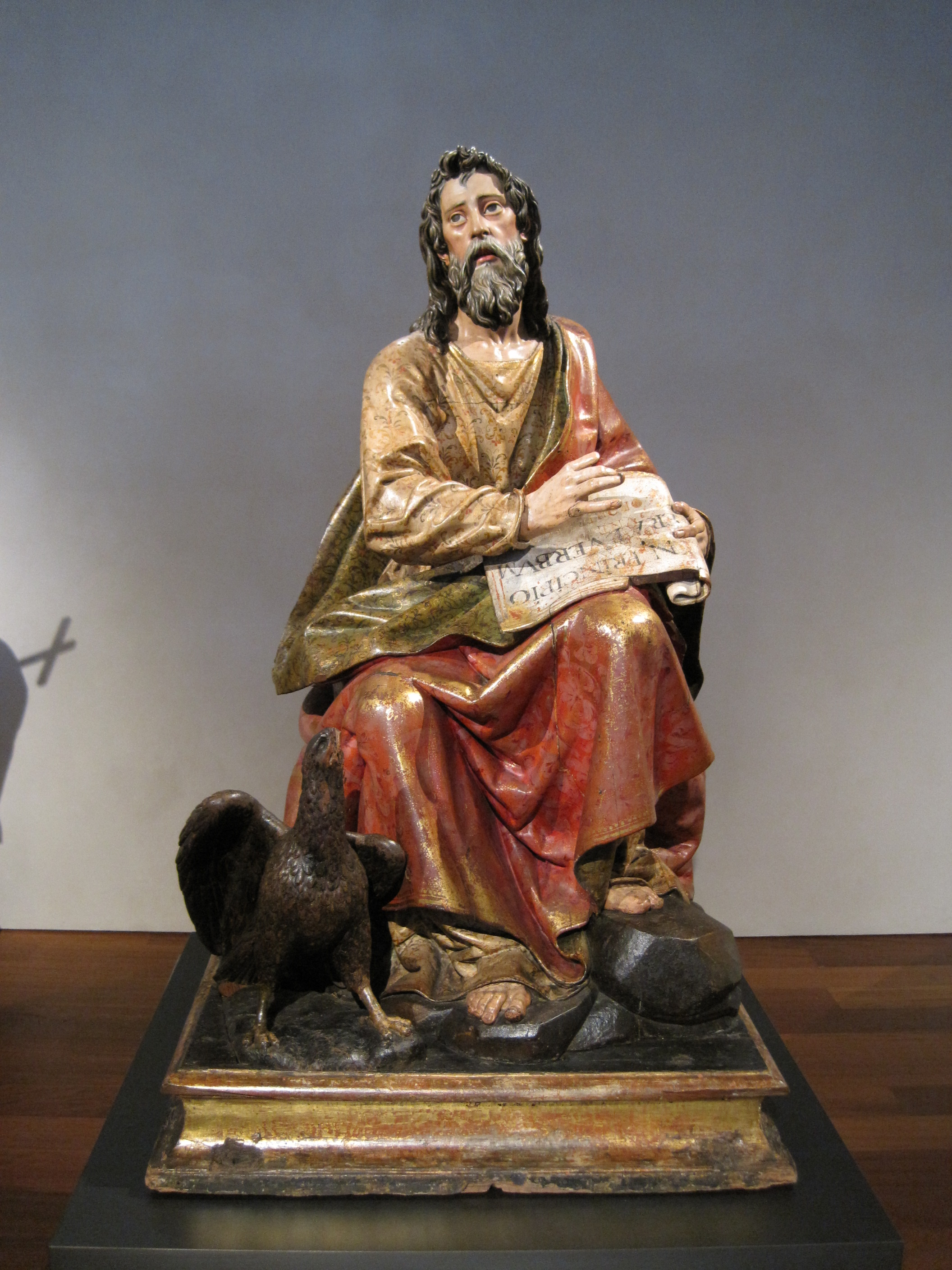
Saint the Evangelist by Juan Martínez Montañés, 1638.

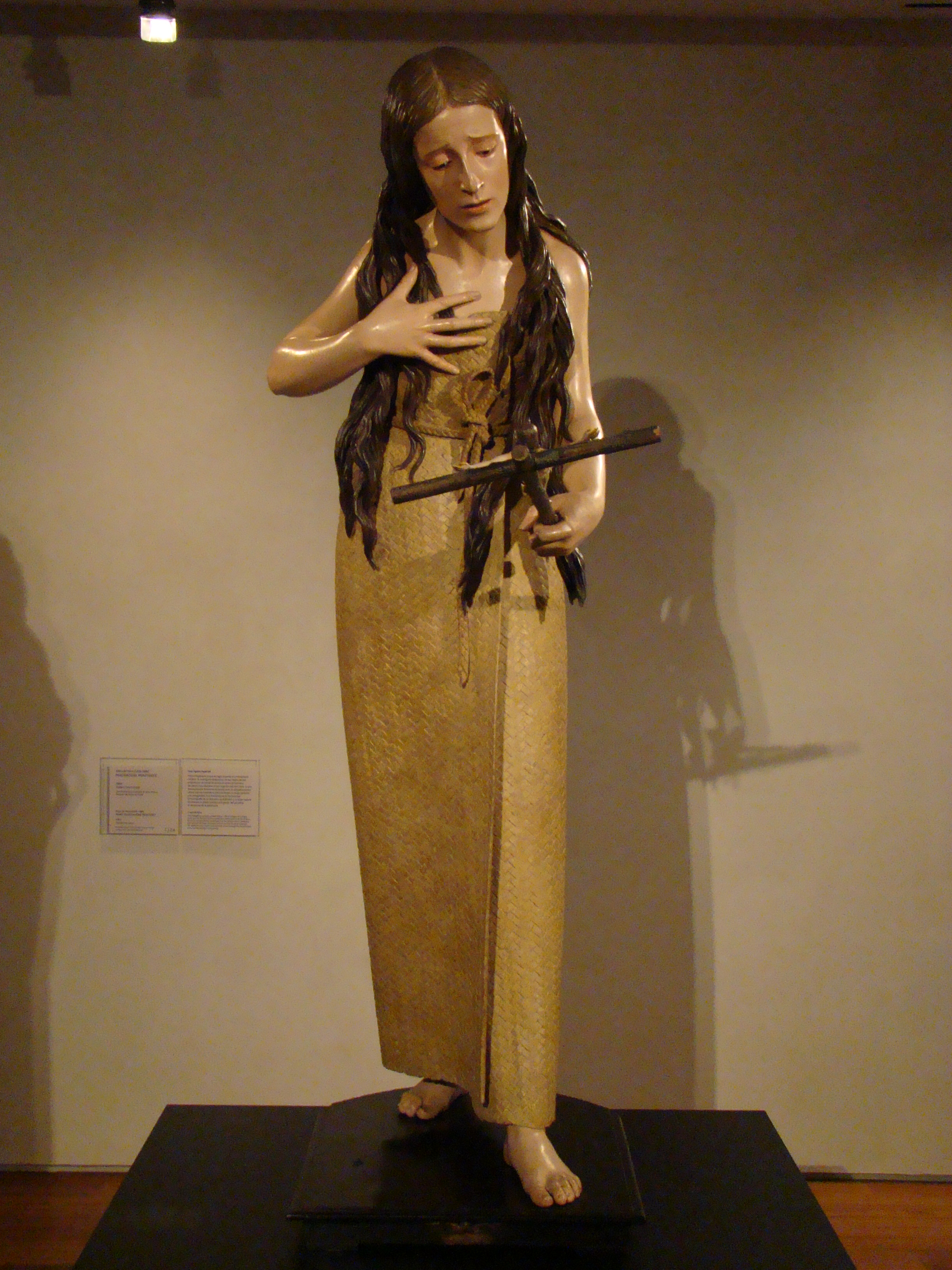
Magdalene penitent by Pedro de Mena, 1663-1664.

== See also ==
- Colegio de San Gregorio
- Museo de Escultura al Aire Libre de Alcalá de Henares
