= Convent of St. Francis, Valladolid =

Convent of St. Francis
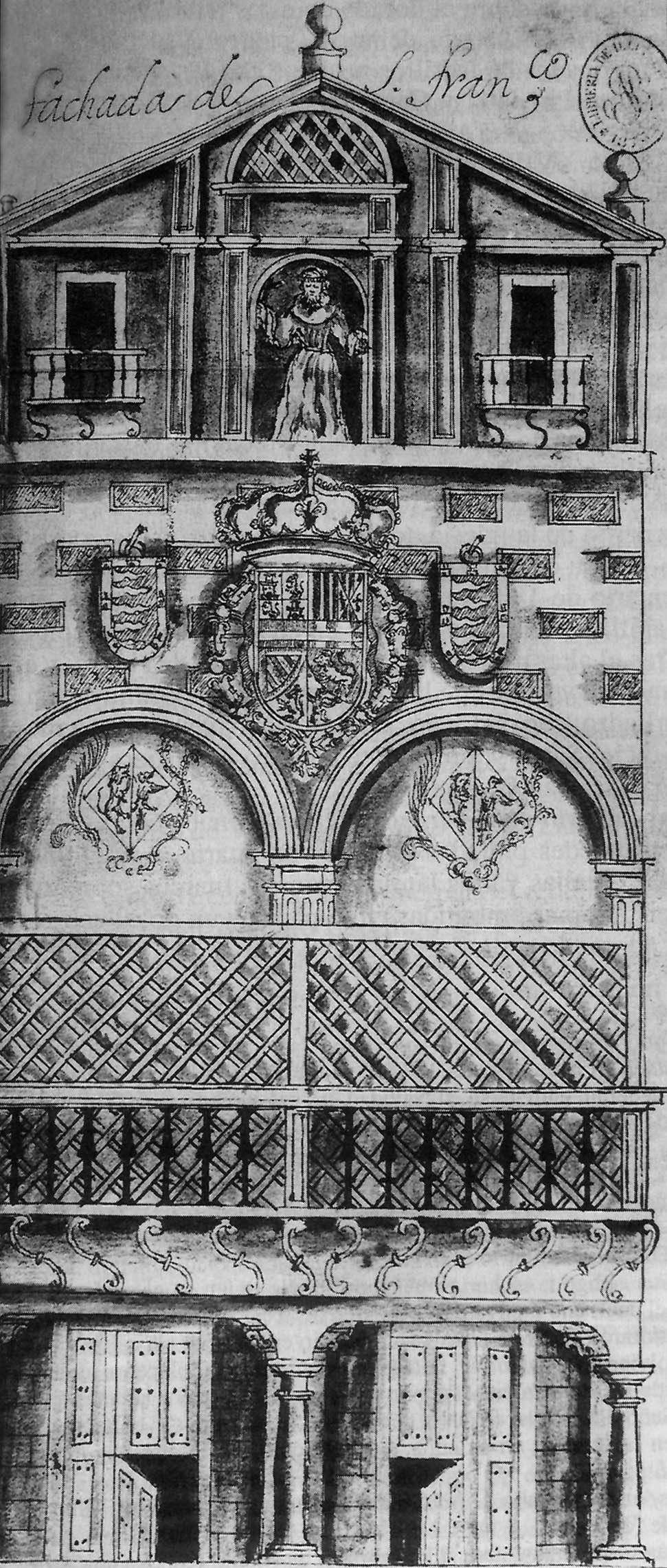
- Drawing of the convent façade by Ventura Pérez to illustrate the History of Valladolid by Juan Antolínez de Burgos.
- Interactive map of the Convent of St. Francis area

General information
- Type: Capuchin Convent
- Architectural style: Gothic
- Location: Valladolid, Spain
- Coordinates: 41.651647°N 4.728067°W
- Construction started: 12th century
- Owner: Order of Friars Minor Capuchin

The Convent of St. Francis (Spanish: Convento de San Francisco), in Valladolid, Spain, was founded in the 13th century and located outside the city walls, in front of the market square (which would become the future Plaza Mayor). The convent was protected and sponsored in that century by Doña Violante, wife of King Alfonso X of Castile ('Alfonso the Wise'). Its existence had a great impact on the social and religious life of Valladolid, extending its life until 1836, when it was demolished and its huge plot of land was divided up and put up for sale. From that date, it became part of the lost patrimony of Valladolid.

Christopher Columbus died in Valladolid in May 1506 and was buried in the church of this Franciscan convent, although it is still not known in which house or hospital exactly he died. During the commemoration of the 5th centenary of his death, the City Council of Valladolid placed a plaque in his memory on the site of the Convent of St. Francis. (Note: In 1513, Ferdinand the Catholic ordered his remains to be transferred to the Cartuja de Santa María de las Cuevas, outside the walls of Seville. Emperor Charles I issued a Royal Decree in Valladolid on 2 June 1537 to Doña María de Toledo to bury Columbus in the main chapel of the Cathedral of Santo Domingo on the island of Hispaniola. The island was ceded to the French in 1796, so the remains were transferred to the cathedral of Havana, kept in a rich silver urn on the Gospel side of the presbytery, as a great honor. But Havana also ceased to be Spanish and then the remains of Columbus crossed the ocean again to be placed in 1899 in the Holy Church Cathedral Basilica of Seville.)

== History of the convent ==
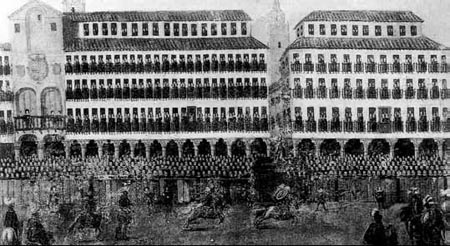
Depiction of the Convent of St. Francis in a painting from 1656.

The Franciscans arrived in the city of Valladolid in the first third of the 13th century, although there are many discussions about the exact date. The founding document is lost and the different historians and researchers have been shuffling dates in accordance with other events and with the trips that St. Francis himself made to Spain to found convents. The architect and academician of Fine Arts Juan Agapito y Revilla mentions the date of 1210 as the arrival of the Franciscans to Valladolid taking as references the opinions of the historians of this city Matías Sangrador y Vítores, Juan Ortega Rubio, Casimiro G. García-Valladolid and Juan Antolínez de Burgos (the oldest historian) who says in his Historia de Valladolid:

The foundation of the convent of the Lord St. Francis of Valladolid was in the era of 1248, which is the year 1210, by one of the companions of the Saint called Friar Gil, which was two years after his conversion and at the age of 27. [...]

The historian Manuel Canesi also mentions this friar; he says that he was born in Assisi and that he was first a disciple and then a companion of St. Francis.

In the first years of the 20th century, a manuscript —which had been considered lost— called Manuscrito de fray Matías de Sobremonte, written in 1660, with the abbreviated title of Historia inédita del convento de San Francisco de Valladolid, became known. It was discovered by the scholar Antonio de Nicolás, who dedicated a whole chapter to it in the Boletín de la Sociedad Castellana de Excursiones, volume I; the scholars and disseminators of the text were Agapito y Revilla and José Martí y Monsó; the original was kept in the library of the Palacio de Santa Cruz. The author of this manuscript is the Franciscan father Matías de Sobremonte. This friar was a scholar of the history of the convents of his order, including this one in Valladolid. Sobremonte speaks of the traditional date of 1210 as the foundation of the Valladolid convent, but at the same time he doubts it by making other considerations. Researchers of the twentieth and twenty-first centuries have assured a later date, around 1230, being in complete agreement on what were the beginnings and on its later transfer in the 1260s.

=== Start-up and relocation ===
Queen Berengaria of Castile, wife of King Alfonso IX of León, ceded to the Franciscan Fathers the lands of an estate located in the area known as Río de Olmos. (Note: It was known as Río de Olmos an area between the Pisuerga River (at the height of the Arturo Eyríes bridge) and the Paseo de Zorrilla, near the slaughterhouse until reaching the Camino Viejo de Simancas to the bridge of Hispanoamerica or Hispanidad. On these lands there were many properties with houses, orchards and fruit trees, which were called riberas because they were on the banks of the river. Some of these properties were donated by their owners to found convents, such as this one of the Franciscans, another of the Carmelite friars and a first house of St. Teresa of Ávila. Fernández del Hoyo (1998, p. 329)) It is possible that this happened around 1230, but the date is controversial. This place was quite far from the city and was considered quite unhealthy to live in, and since it was far from the town, alms were scarce. The Franciscans always tried to build their convents in the city itself, or at least in the nearby outskirts, since their condition of preachers and mendicants required a continuous contact with the citizens. Some years later, another queen, Violante, wife of Alfonso X the Wise, offered them a plot of land and some houses near the first wall, for their possible relocation. For this purpose, she issued a letter of donation on March 6, 1267, signed in Seville, in which she declared that she was ceding land and houses to the new queen.

... for the good and health and honor of the King and of my family and of my company.

The large site was located outside the walls but next to the large area that was then used as a market. Over the centuries all this space would remain in the center of the city of Valladolid. At the beginning, the friars had many difficulties with the move, as they were opposed by the abbot, (Note: In the 13th century Valladolid was not a cathedral diocese but had a collegiate church headed by an abbot. This collegiate church had its own collegiate chapter.Mañueco Villalobos & Zurita Nieto (1917, pp. 24–46)) the infante Sancho and the Cathedral chapter, but the support of Queen Violant was definitive for the new location of the Franciscans. A century later, another queen, María de Molina, would also protect this convent, making a donation of some palace-houses that she kept adjacent to the Franciscan facilities and that overlooked Olleros Street, which would form part of the extension.

=== Extension of the convent enclosure ===
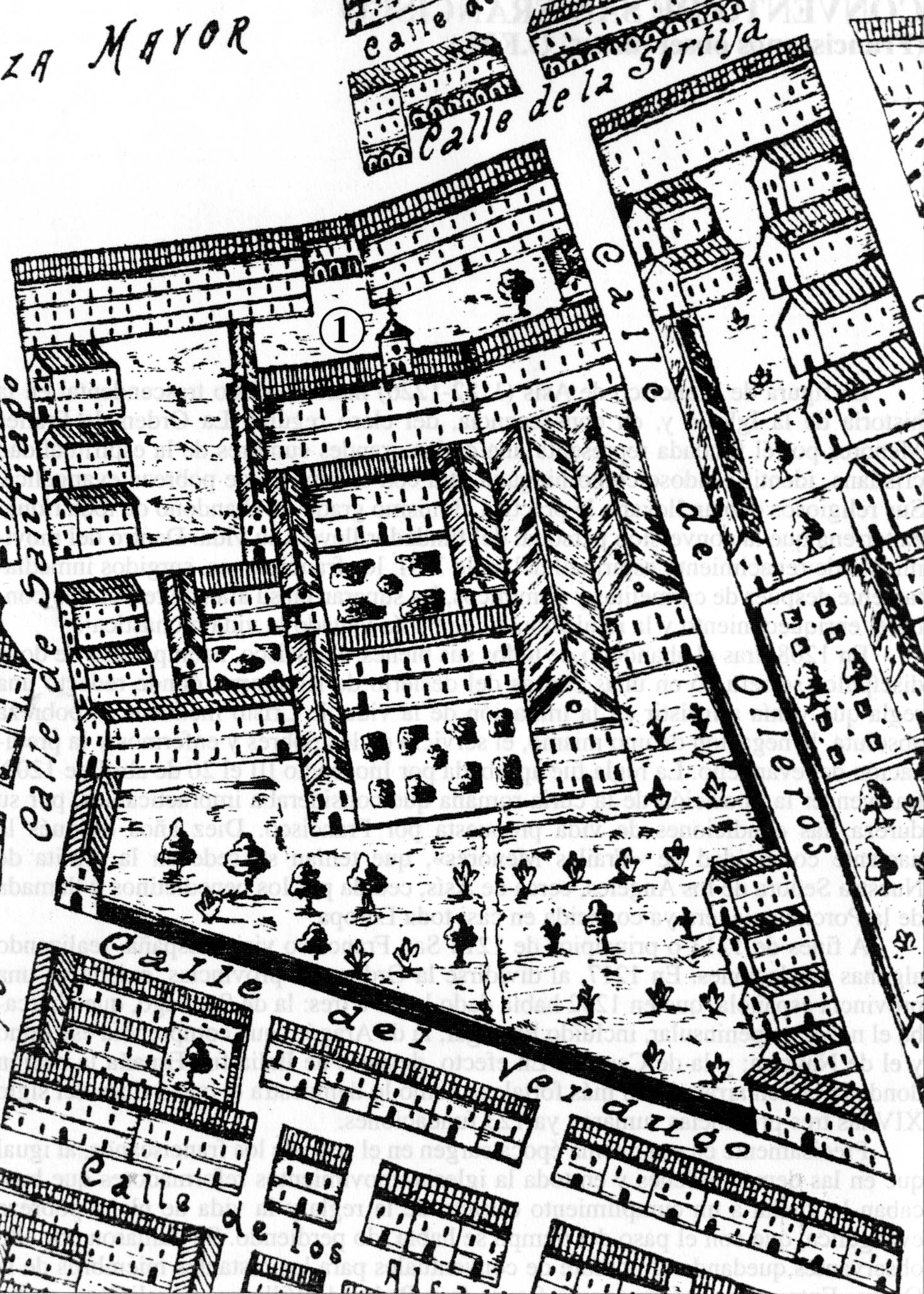
Plan by Ventura Seco, 1738. The 1 is the location of the convent extending to the south and to the sides.

The convent perimeter came to comprise a large space that extended along the entire front facing the market square (future Plaza Mayor and future Acera de San Francisco), turned the corner on Olleros Street and along this street to the south reached Verdugo Street, named Montero Calvo Street after the confiscation; it continued along this street until it reached Santiago Street and from there went up north until it reached the Acera de San Francisco again. In all this huge site were the monastic buildings, church, several cloisters, hostelry, orchard, corrals and gardens. There were also private houses sold or given by the Franciscans themselves, the hospital of Juan Hurtado and some council quarters next to the main door leading to the market. These quarters were used while the old City Hall building was being built.

It was surrounded by a fence that protected it, as was common in all convents and monasteries, in which only two doors opened: one was the access from the Plaza Mayor, the main door. It led to a large corral and immediately after it was the church that occupied the space that would later become Constitución Street. The other entrance was on Santiago Street, at the height of the Iglesia de Santiago itself. It was called Puerta de las Carretas and in 1599 a doorway with arch, cornice and frontispiece with a niche where a sculpture of St. Francis made of alabaster and stone was placed. (Note: García Chico, E. Arquitectos.) After passing through the door, the church was reached through a narrow alley.

=== Life of the convent until its demolition ===
The Franciscans of this convent had a great spiritual influence on the social life of Valladolid. It was also a great cultural contribution and its history was very rich in religious events. Its total disappearance in 1836 was a great loss for the city, although at the same time, the recovery of the extensive site brought with it an important urban transformation in a Valladolid that was growing in that area and that needed the creation of buildings and access roads.

At the beginning of the 15th century, the Franciscan monks had reached a rather relaxed form of enclosure. (Note: All the monastic orders, after a time, reach the relaxation. It is then that reforms and observance arise, trying to adjust again to the primitive rules of the founder.) In 1416 there was a reformist movement that grouped together several convents that chose the one in Valladolid as the head of the Franciscan Province of the Immaculate Conception. By then this convent had a large community. To the point that Father Sobremonte says in his history:

... there were so many that they could not fit in the choir.

Important events related to religious life in general or to the civil life of the city took place in the convent:

- In 1570 fray Juan Perez de Pineda (1513?-1593?) (who had problems with the Inquisition), decided to change from the Province of Santiago, to the Province of the Conception in the convent of Valladolid, where he was well received and resided for quite some time. Juan de Pineda, erudite preacher, was one of the best writers of his time in Castilian language.
- Juan de Zumárraga, first bishop of New Spain, appointed by Charles V in 1528, had to return to Spain to be consecrated, a ceremony that took place on April 27, 1533, in this convent.
- In 1695 the consecration of the president of the Chancillería of Valladolid, Francisco Juániz de Muruzábal y Ocáriz, appointed archbishop of Cartagena, was celebrated. The large procession entered the church through the chapel of Copacabana, making a distinction between men and women; the women entered through the portico of the cloister in the nave of Santa Juana. The entire community came out to welcome the illustrious retinue. After the religious ceremony, the event ended with the celebration of festivities with fireworks, drinks and sweets.
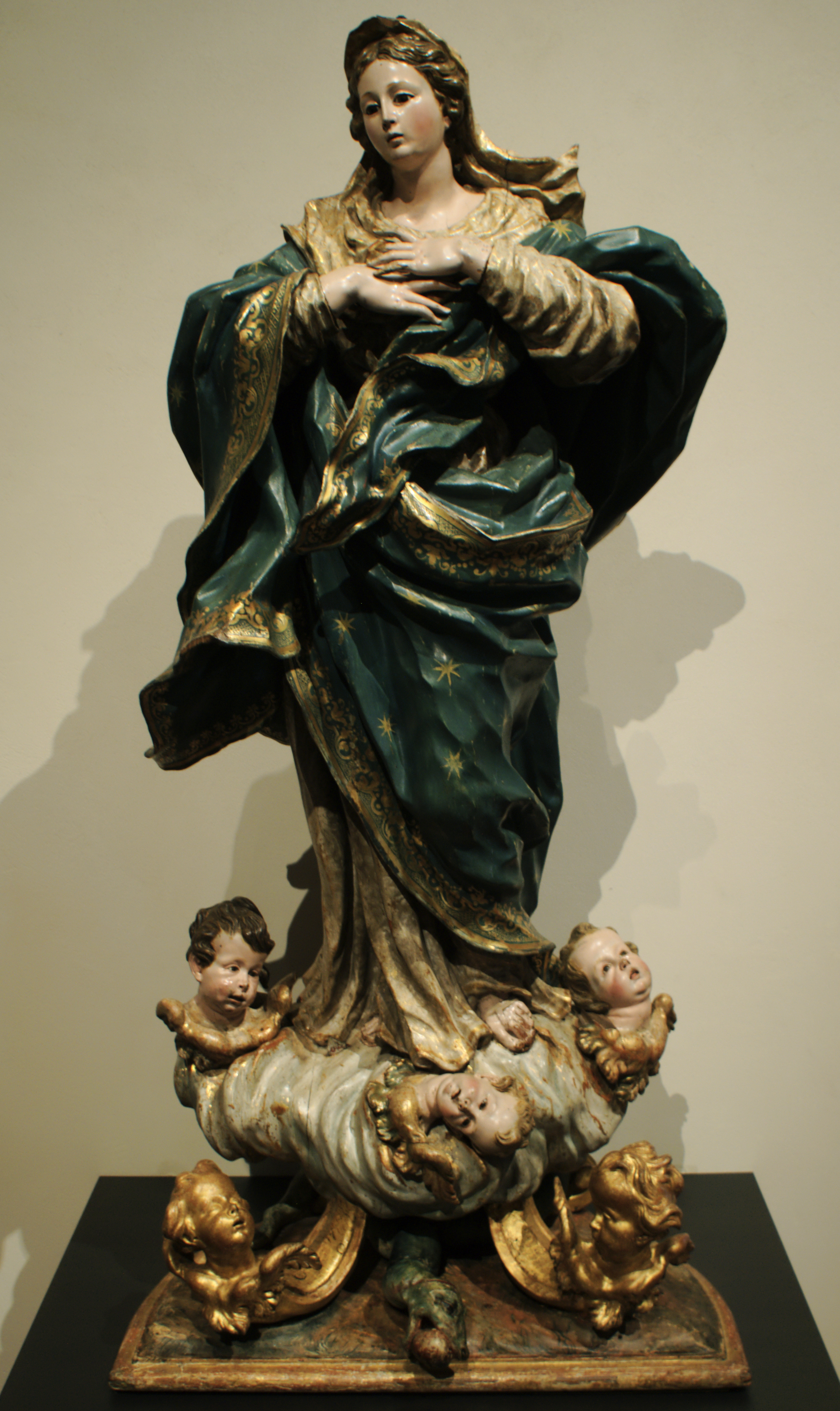
- Image of the Immaculate Conception, usually located in the choir. Author Pedro de Sierra
  In 1740 the General Chapter of the Order was held in the convent. There was a great procession on June 5, the day of Pentecost, in which they paraded a great number of saints (behind each one there was a religious with a cope), closing the procession the image of the Immaculate Conception that was usually located in the choir of the church. This event was much celebrated in the city and was extensively narrated by C. González García Valladolid in his Recuerdos y grandezas (Memories and Greatness). Ventura Pérez also mentions it in his Diario de Valladolid in the section entitled Capítulo general de San Francisco en esta ciudad.

[...] On June 4, the eve of Easter of the Holy Spirit, the General was elected and Friar Cajetan Labrino, a Neapolitan of the Province of Naples, Commissary General of the Roman Curia and other honors, was elected. [...]

- In the years 1746 and 1747 great festivities were celebrated on the occasion of the canonization of St. Peter de Regalado, patron saint of Valladolid. On June 20, 1747, the image of this saint was transferred from the chapel of Copacabana to the cathedral. Ventura Pérez gives an extensive account of more than seven pages in his book of memoirs.

[...] A battalion of soldiers was leading the procession, dressed in their guard uniforms, blue coats and red jackets and breeches. [...] They intoned the Te Deum with a great din of clarinets, timpani, violins, horns and contrabass; there were many foreign musicians, and concluded that it was beautifully illuminated the façade [...]

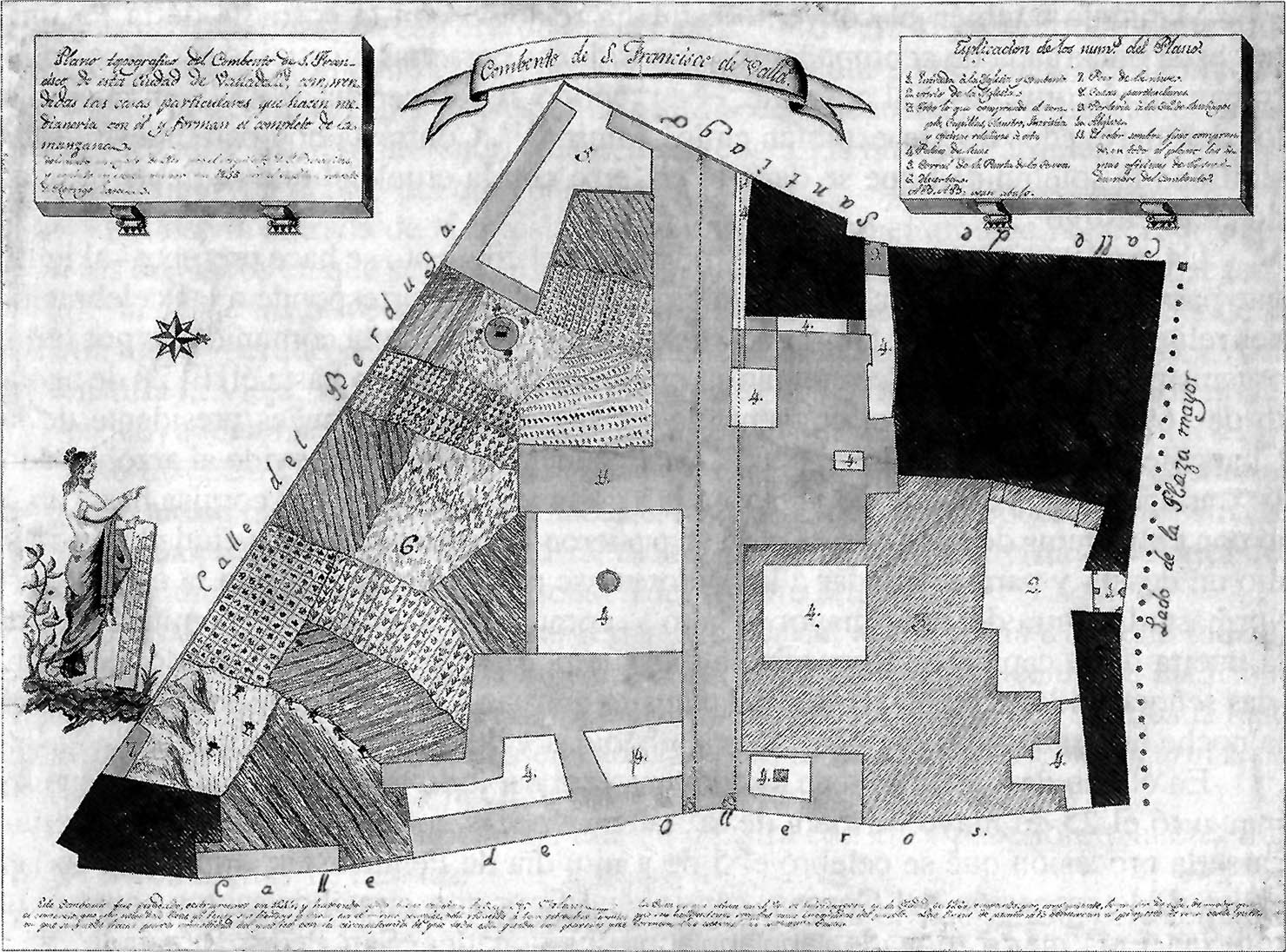
Plan by Rodrigo Exea (1835), copying Francisco Benavides' original of 1810. Preserved in the Valladolid Museum. 1.- Entrance to the church and convent. 2.- Atrium of the church. 3.- All that comprises the temple, chapels, cloister, sacristy and offices related to it. 4.- Courtyards of lights. 5.- Corral of the door of the houses. 6.- Orchard. 7.- Snow well. 8.- Private houses. 9.- Gateway of the Santiago Street. 10.- Cistern. 11.- The loose shade color includes in all the planthe other offices of the servitude of the convent.

The life of the convent and its relationship with the city went smoothly until the Spanish War of Independence when all these religious houses were suppressed. On August 18, 1809, they obtained a special authorization to keep the church open (the same happened with other convents). In September of that same year an inventory of the sumptuary works was made. Ortega Rubio notes that in February 1811 the main doors, the façade and the patio of the church were demolished and work began on the construction of houses. In February 1814, after the war with Napoleon, the Franciscans returned to their convent, which they found quite reduced (part of it had already been sold to private individuals), until in 1835 (as a consequence of the confiscation) the orchard was also put up for public auction, which in addition to vegetables had 80 fruit trees and elm trees, plus a noria in good condition. The Official Bulletin of Valladolid announced on August 6, 1836, the sale of the ...

[...] building that was the convent of St. Francis located on the sidewalk to which it gives its name, with its church, chapels, upper and lower rooms, cellar, courtyards, orchard with its waterwheel, cistern, seven drinking water wells, another for snow, stables and barns [...] valued at 4,520,060 reales 17 maravedíes.

There is no record of anyone taking up the offer, so the board for the sale of buildings and effects of the disentailed convents in the province of Valladolid had to take charge and proposed the demolition at the expense of the State. The demolition began on February 1, 1837, and once all the buildings had been demolished, the plots were put up for sale. The buyers were obliged to cede to the City Hall 16,710 square feet to open a street (which would be the Constitution Street) from the entrance of Santiago Street to Olleros Street (Duque de la Victoria). Many of the tiles from the convent were used to pave the decrepit old City Hall and to build the clock tower. Almost a year later, the demolition work was still going on. Some important works of art could be rescued by the State and saved in the National Museum of Sculpture, but most of them disappeared —as no records were taken— without a trace.

=== 19th to 21st century monastic grounds ===
Duque de la Victoria, formerly Olleros Street. Montero Calvo, former Verdugo Street and later Caldereros. The orange area represents the total perimeter of the convent.

Finally, in 1847, the industrialist Pedro Ochotorena bought all the land from the City Council, committing himself to open the required street between the door of the convent facing Santiago Street and Olleros Street. This street would be called Constitución. He then opened another street perpendicular to Constitución that would lead to Verdugo —which in those years had changed its name to Caldereros Street—. This new street was baptized with the name of Mendizábal, in memory of and in homage to the minister who had been the promoter of the Disentailment. Years later the street was renamed Menéndez Pelayo.

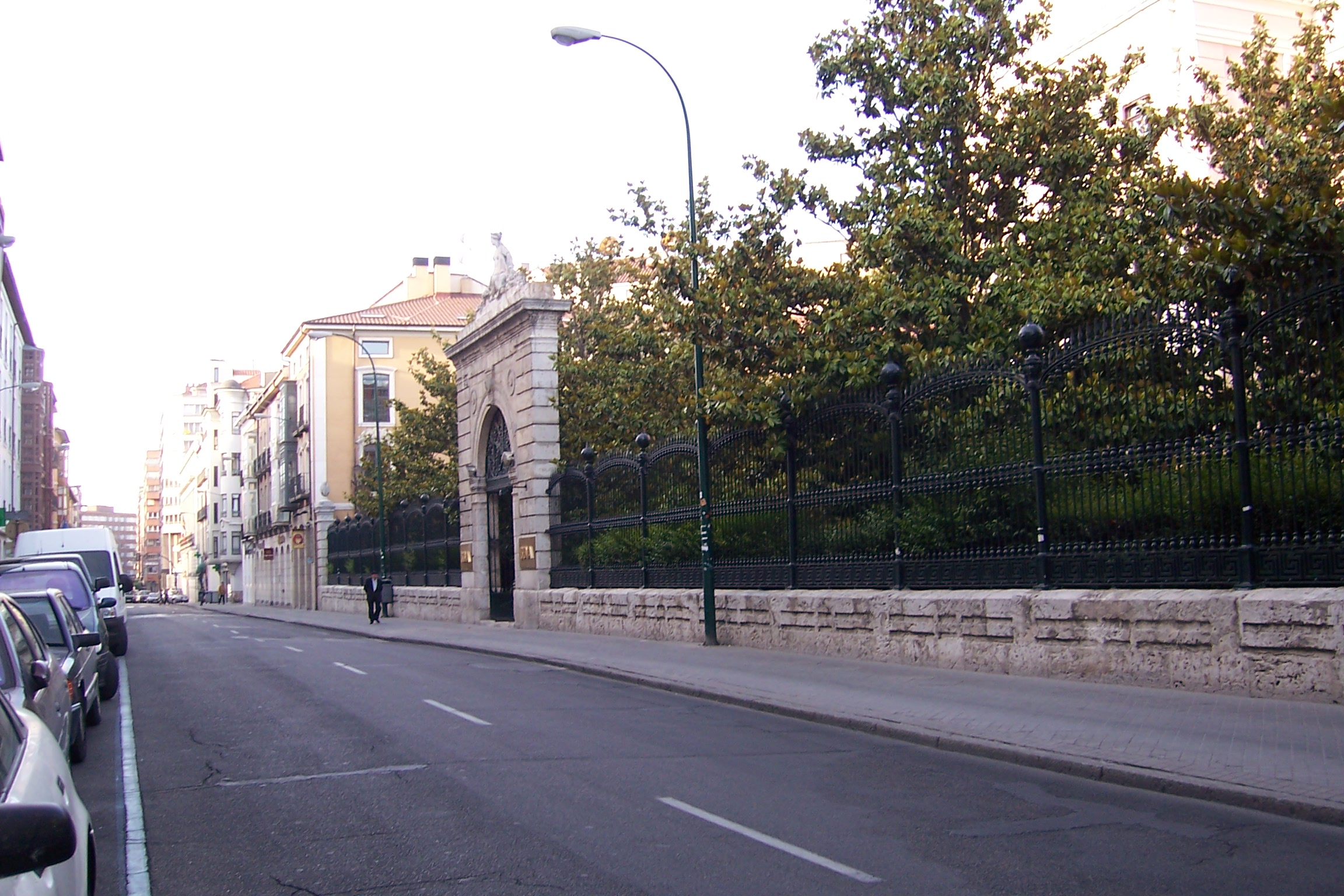
Banco Castellano in Duque de la Victoria Street, formerly Olleros.

Little by little and between the last years of the nineteenth century and the first years of the twentieth century, special buildings and private homes were erected. In 1853, the Casino Cultural Society acquired a piece of land on the corner of Constitución and Olleros streets, (Note: This street was only three years away from changing its name to Duque de la Victoria Street) where they erected a building that had to be rebuilt in 1901. In the last years of the 19th century, Antonio Ortiz Vega ordered the construction of a palace of great proportions, with a large garden, whose perimeter extended from Duque de la Victoria Street (formerly Olleros) to the new Menéndez y Pelayo Street (formerly Mendizábal); in 1900, this palace became the headquarters of the Banco Castellano.

In 1884 the Zorrilla Theater was built, giving its façade to the Acera de San Francisco. In order not to break the harmony of the arcades of the Plaza Mayor, the main entrance to the theater was made on Constitución Street. In 1928 the Telefónica building was erected with a façade on Duque de la Victoria. In 1934, on the corner of Constitución and Santiago, the La Unión and Fénix buildings were built.

On Constitución Street, in front of the Zorrilla Theater building, the Hotel Europa (now disappeared) was built. When this hotel was demolished in the 1970s to begin work on the Galerías Preciados department store, several burial sites (Note: Tombs had also been found in 1853, when the earth was removed to lay the foundations of the Recreation Circle.) and the remains of columns and foundations of the convent were discovered.

=== Fires ===
The great fire that took place in Valladolid on September 21, 1561, also affected the convent, especially the façade. After this disaster, the great restoration and remodeling works began in the city, and the definitive Plaza Mayor was built. For the Acera de San Francisco, Philip II issued a Royal Decree on December 23, 1564. In point 2, it states the following:

That the doorway of Sant Francisco be built, bringing it up to the level of the others and above it a corridor with an altar to say mass and above this corridor, there should be others up to the height of the houses on one side and on the other, so that the texearoz is all one.

On June 1, 1699, at 12:30 p.m., there was another minor fire that started in the neighboring houses of the nave of Santa Juana.

=== Guilds ===
The convent was closely linked to two brotherhoods: that of the Vera Cruz and that of the Passion. The Cofradía de la Vera Cruz was born within the convent and even after having its own headquarters at the end of the 16th century, the Franciscans continued to take care of it, and relations were always good between the two. The Cofradía de la Pasión was in charge of searching the roads for the mortal remains of the executed and dismembered (for blood crimes) and then accompanying them, on Lazarus Sunday (fifth Sunday of Lent), to the Convent of St. Francis where they had a place for their burial, a special chapel that served as an ossuary. It was called the Capilla de los Ajusticiados.

In the chapel of St. Anthony of Padua (described below) the confraternity-tailors of the Brotherhood of the Mancebos Sastres had their patronage from the 17th century onwards. The La capilla de los condes de Cabra had as its patron the Cofradía de Nuestra Señora de la pura y limpia Concepción.

Façades of the two churches that were the headquarters of the confraternities

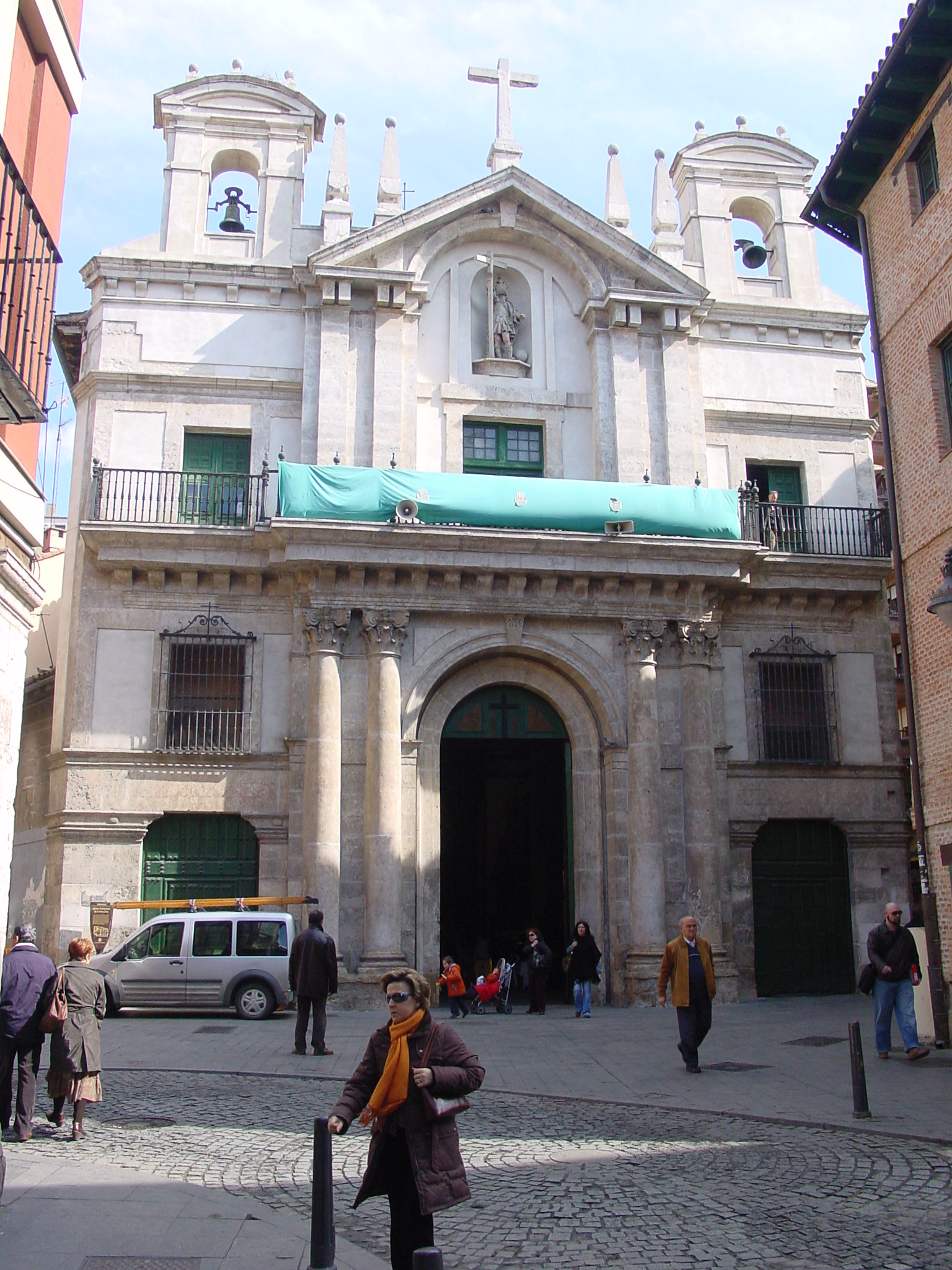
Vera Cruz church façade

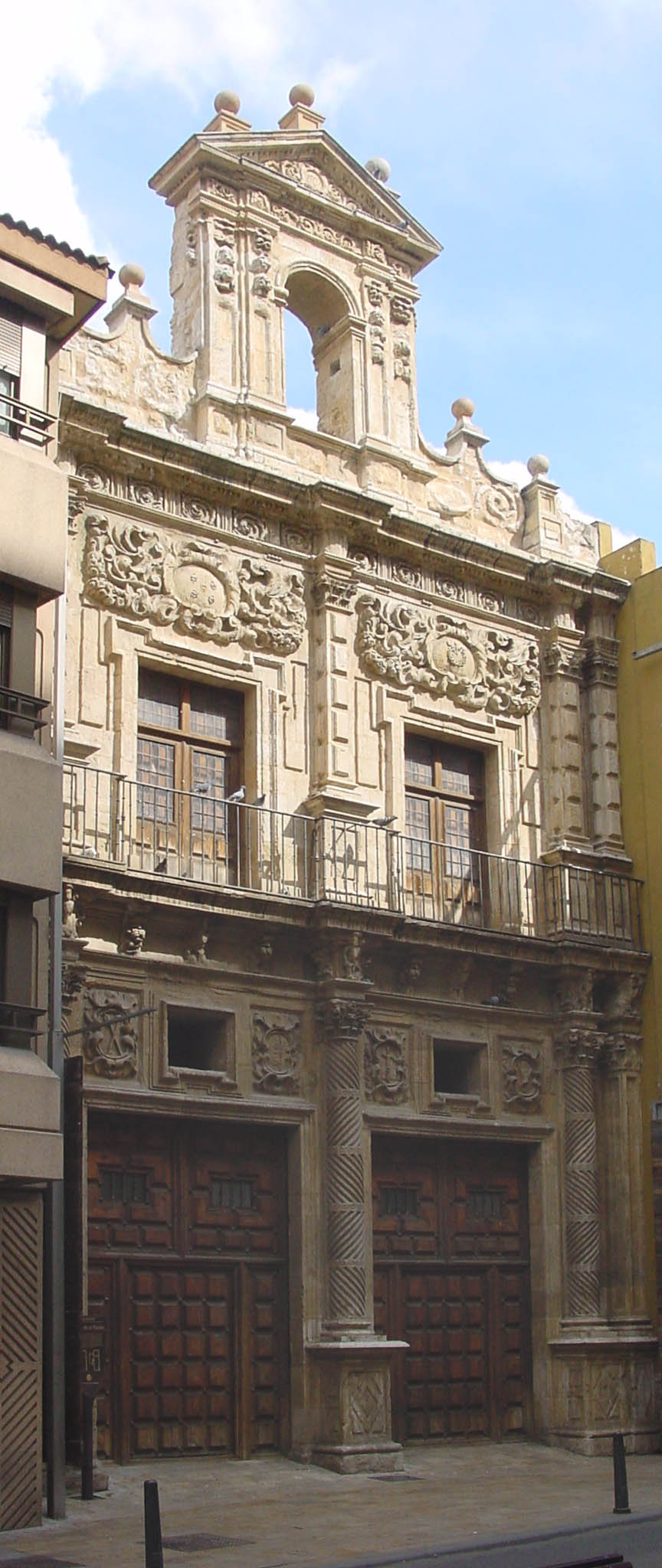
Passion church façade

== Architecture and works of art ==
=== Facade to the Plaza Mayor ===
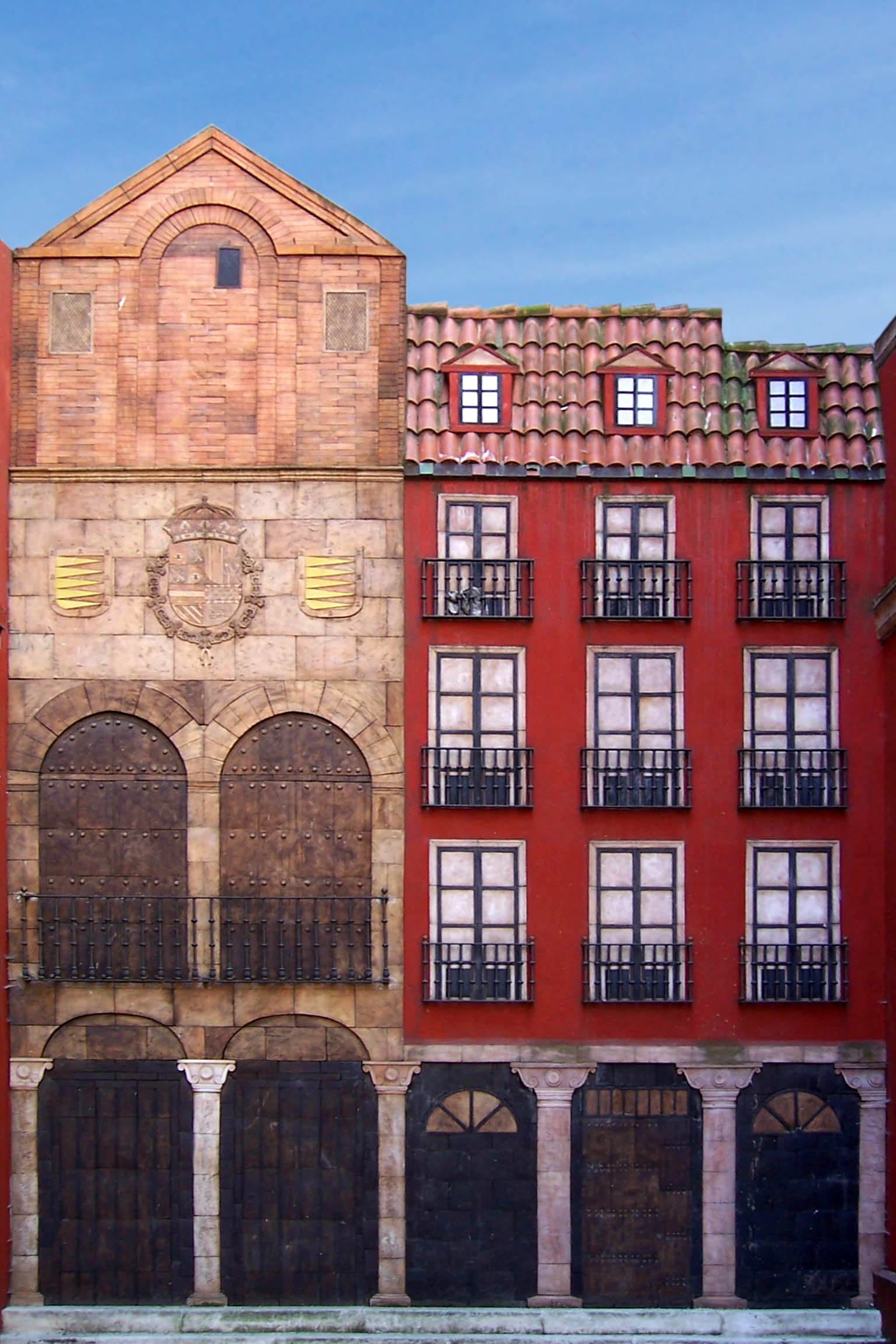
Front of the Convent of St. Francis in Valladolid. It is made of ceramic and copied from a drawing by Ventura Pérez (18th century). Located at the end of the Callejón de San Francisco (without exit) which in the past was a street that gave to the Plaza Mayor by the north side. From this street, one had the perspective of the front of the convent on the opposite sidewalk.

There is graphic evidence of the exterior façade facing the Plaza Mayor in a drawing by Ventura Pérez made in the 18th century, as well as in a canvas from 1506 and another from 1656. Sobremonte tells that already between 1455 and 1456, being archbishop of Toledo Alfonso Carrillo de Acuña, the facade was reformed, raising then a second floor with a balcony where an altar could be installed, so that the merchants could hear mass without leaving their work. After the fire of 1561 and the Royal Order of Philip II, the facade was restored with its balcony for the mass and was taken out at the level of the other facades of houses that were to the right and left. (Note: Since ancient times the friars had sold or rented the area next to the wall that ran along the entire length of the Plaza Mayor, so that their owners could use it for stores. Little by little, these owners built one or two floors of housing on top of it, much to the displeasure of the friars, since they exceeded the height of the fence and from there one could see the interior of the convent, if windows were opened on the south side. Fernández del Hoyo (1998, p. 56)) In 1727 the image of St. Francis was placed on the pediment, this being the cause of dispute and confrontation between the friars and the City Council, who protested loudly because the convent had modified the facade without permission from the city.

=== The church ===
There are no drawings, paintings or lithographs of the church building. However, through the documents kept in the Provincial Historical Archives of Valladolid, in the Municipal and Treasury archives and through the description of historians and travelers (Note: The traveler Antonio Ponz, the historian Matías Sangrador y Vitores (Historia de Valladolid II, 1854), Alcalde Prieto and R. Gallardo (Manual Histórico y Descriptivo de Valladolid), José María Quadrado (Recuerdos y bellezas de España, Valladolid), (1885) wrote about the convent and the church.) who came to know it, a broad description of the church can be made, both of its floor plan and of the interior, its chapels and its works of art. The inventory of the works of art contained in the church during the years of the French occupation in 1809, at the time of the first exclaustration, is very valuable. 8 bronze or gilded metal lamps, 16 confessionals and 22 altars were counted, among many other items.

The main door of the church had been at the foot, to the west, but was later changed to the north side, between the chapels of Santa Catalina and San Antonio de los Cañedos. This door was preceded by a vaulted ashlar portico. The church was Gothic in style and had a single nave measuring 39.20 m long by 12.60 m wide. Originally only the main chapel was vaulted, while the body of the church was covered with wood, until reforms were made in the 16th century and it was modified with seven ribbed vaults. The temple had 10 chapels in addition to the main chapel. All the chapels were founded and sponsored by the most influential families of the city, who also took these spaces as burial places. Royal personages were also buried under the vaults of this convent.

==== Main chapel ====
Originally the convent was a royal foundation (patronage of three consecutive queens, Berenguela, Violante and María de Molina), so the main chapel was also a royal foundation. Over the centuries, this protection would belong to other characters, either of the nobility, or wealthy merchants who could afford the financial support.

From the beginning of the 16th century, the family of Gómez Manrique de Mendoza wanted to gain access to the patronage of this chapel, although they were strongly opposed by the friars. Even so, in 1613 it is known that Carlos Manrique de Mendoza, Count of Castro, buried in this chapel the remains of his parents that he had ordered to be brought from Castrogeriz in Burgos. However, either they did not obtain the patronage as they would have wished or they shared it with the merchant Alonso de Portillo who in 1543 hired the plasterers and masons Gaspar de Mendoza and Diego de Segovia for this purpose:

[...] plastering, washing and brushing the hull and transepts of the main chapel [...] washing and brushing the walls that are under the main altar [...] making a frescoed sign where the shelves of the said main chapel end, giving us the said Alonso de Portillo the drawn letters that we have to put on the said sign [...].

The main chapel was entered through a pointed arch and was separated from the rest of the church by a grille. Within this area was located the chapel of the Rivera family (on the Gospel side), the Old and New sacristies and the chapel of San Bernardino, called resacristy by Father Sobremonte. The main chapel contained several works of art and very valuable canvases, inventoried in 1809. Besides the main altarpiece it had two other lateral ones.

==== Altarpieces ====
The main chapel had three consecutive main altarpieces and two collateral ones from the 16th century that were also replaced by others a century later.

The first main altarpiece was acquired and sponsored in 1578 by the will of Gómez Manrique, son of the Counts of Castro. Martí y Monsó made an exhaustive study on this subject, providing documentation of appraisers and buyers.

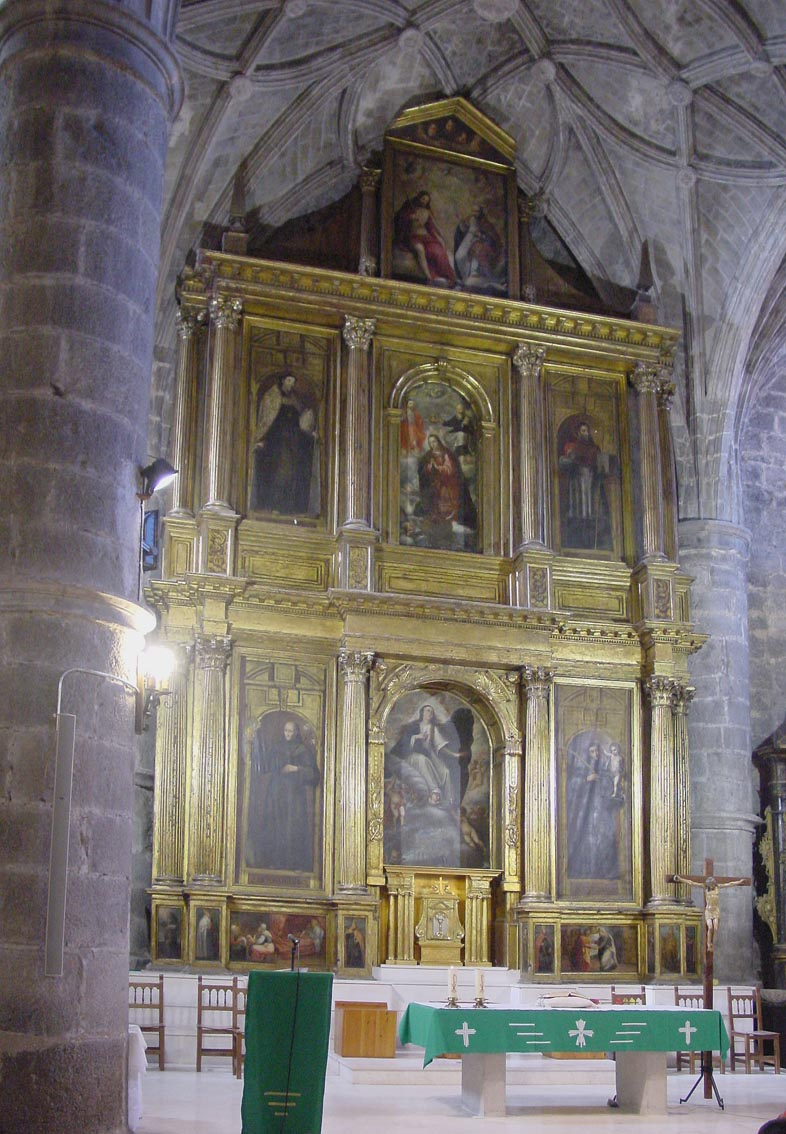
Second altarpiece found in the parish of Laguna de Duero (Valladolid).

There was a second altarpiece with paintings, which was installed around 1622 and lasted a few years because by 1674 it had already been dismantled and sold for the price of 5000 reales to the parish of Laguna de Duero (Valladolid) where it was adjusted by the assembler Blas Martínez de Obregón. It consists of a bench, two sections, three streets and an attic. In the first are the effigies of St. Anthony of Padua and St. Bernardino of Siena. In the second is San Buenaventura and a bishop. These four canvases are by Diego Valentín Díaz. The two in the center represent the Assumption of Mary and the Coronation, works of Diego Díez Ferreras. In the attic there is a canvas of the Eternal Father and Jesus Christ.

The third altarpiece was paid for by the Mendoza family in 1674. In the Provincial Archive there is news that in 1674 the gilder Miguel Jeronimo de Mondragon undertook to execute the gilding of this altarpiece and to have it finished within the stipulated period. This altarpiece was seen by the historian Canesi. It was one of the works highlighted in the inventory of 1809.

==== Grilles ====
The main chapel had two consecutive grilles that served to separate the presbytery from the rest of the church. Of the first one there is hardly any news, only that it was a poor and lackluster work, so the friars ordered a second one that they brought from Biscay without finishing it. The finishing work was given to the rejero Rodríguez de San Pedro, of whom there is confusing information. Canesi and Martí y Monsó believe that Fray Pedro Villate (a lay rejero who worked on various works in the convent) helped in the completion of this grille.

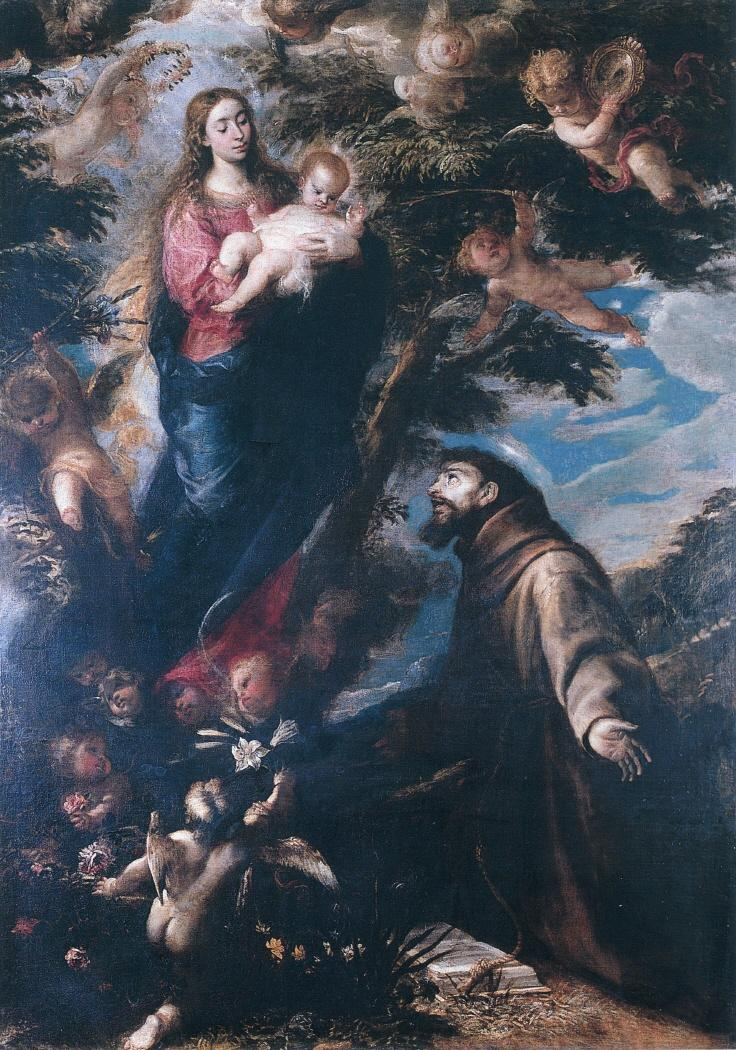
Our Lady standing with St. Francis kneeling before her, by the painter Mateo Cerezo.

==== 1809 Inventory ====
On the north wall were three paintings with gilded frames, representing St. Joseph, St. Dominic and St. Francis. On the front wall there were three others, one of them well described by the traveler Ponz in his Viage a España: Nuestra Señora de pie con San Francisco de rodillas ante ella, by the painter Mateo Cerezo. It is in the Lázaro Galdiano museum in Madrid.

==== Chapel of the Rivera family ====
Also known as the Chapel of the Immaculate Conception. Its founder was Andrés de Rivera (lord of the town of Fuentes de Valdepero and corregidor (mayor) of the city of Burgos who in his will of 1518 left well explained how the chapel should be and the place of his own burial. This chapel was to be built on the site of a corral that was next to the head of the convent church:

[...] that the said my chapel should go out to the main chapel of the said monastery [...].

and it would be placed under the patronage of Nuestra Señora de los Remedios. Andrés de Rivera gave all kinds of details, including how the altarpiece should look like. A century later the chapel was in pretty bad shape and the friars had to ask the founder's descendants for alms for its upkeep.

By the date of 1628 the chapel had an altarpiece with the image of the Immaculate Conception, by the sculptor Francisco de Rincón. During the following years the chapel remained neglected until 1675 when it was totally transformed, changing its title and dedication and being renamed the chapel of Our Lady of Copacabana.

==== Chapel of Our Lady of Copacabana ====
It occupied the same space as the chapel of the Rivera family, changing its name and dedication. Between the years 1676 and 1679, widening and repair works were carried out, resulting in an important enclosure. In 1679 the works were finished and the blessing ceremony of the image of the Virgin of Copacabana was carried out and she was enthroned in her chapel.

The chapel was sponsored by Fray Hernando de la Rua, a monk of the convent who had held the post of General Commissioner of the Provinces of New Spain. Fray Hernando brought from America the image of Copacabana, which was much loved and venerated. The master mason Juan Mazo carried out the works of the chapel, with stone brought from the Valladolid town of Campaspero, under the direction of the master builder Antonio de Bustamante. The chapel turned out to be quite a large space, almost like a small church with a main chapel, transept, main altar and two side altars plus two more in the nave, sacristy and choir with a small organ. The exterior was topped with a spire.

==== Altarpiece ====
The historian Canesi refers to and describes the altarpiece assembled by the master Blas Martínez de Obregón. It had a pedestal with pilasters and Solomonic columns in the two bodies. In the first body was placed the Virgin of Copacabana. Below the camarín was a tile painting with the coat of arms of Ana Mónica Pimentel y Córdoba, VI Countess of Alcaudete, who had been the first camarera of the Virgin.

==== Doors ====
The main door leading to the main chapel was rebuilt and four smaller ones were opened leading to the body of the church and the sacristy. It was the work of the aforementioned assembler Obregón.

==== 1809 Inventory ====
Five altars were counted with their trousseau, a chest with seven vestments of the Virgin, a chest with three Franciscan habits, a book with silver conteras of St. Peter de Regalado, several paintings on the walls. In the room next to the chapel, for the use of the sacristan, there was a cupboard, sheets with gilded frames, a canopy with tissue lining, seven straw chairs, a bed with three mattresses, a table, two small trunks, an ark.

==== Chapel of St. Anthony of Padua ====
It was located on the north wall of the church (Epistle side). It was founded in the 15th century by Luis Morales, treasurer of King John II of Castile with the dedication of Santa Ana. Later it passed to the patronage of the Ulloa family until in the 17th century when another member of that family sold the entire chapel to the Brotherhood of the Mancebos Sastres and since then it has been called the chapel of San Antonio de Padua, who is the patron saint and titular of this brotherhood. The Brotherhood commissioned in 1650 an altarpiece to the assembler José de Castilla. The contract states that the master was to be paid 5900 reales. In the center was the statue of St. Anthony that had been brought from Florence by the Genoese banker Jácome Espínola, who lived in Valladolid, to donate it to the Confraternity. Sobremonte writes about this image describing it as very good and says that it was known as San Antonio el Rico to distinguish it from the chapel known as St. Anthony the Poor.

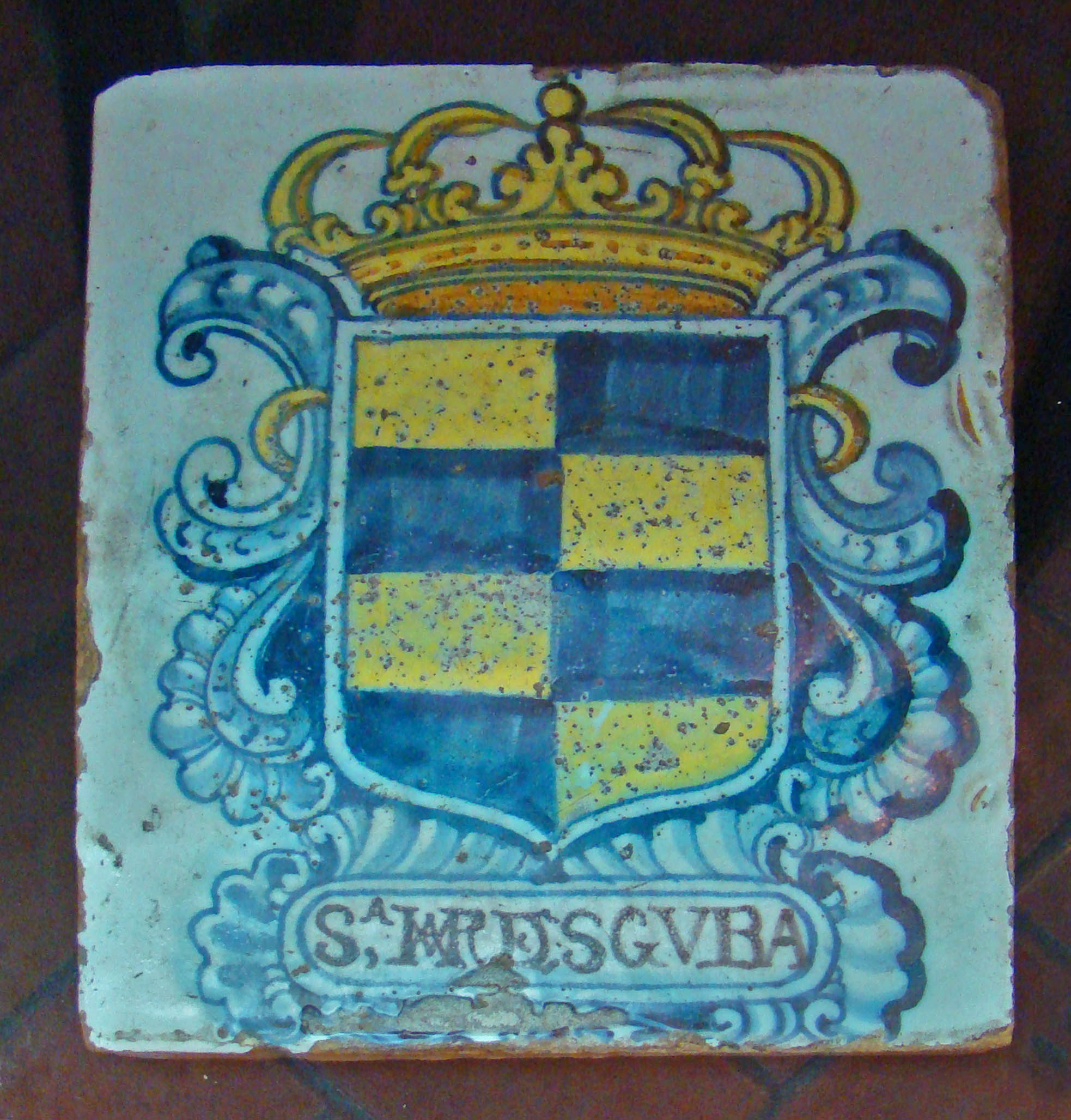
Census tile from the Hospital de Esgueva in Valladolid. Museum of Valladolid in the palace of Fabio Nelli.

==== Chapel of St. Francis ====
It was previously called the chapel of St. Mancio and was founded by the major crossbowman Ruy Pérez de Agraz, later passing the patronage to the Hospital de Esgueva.

==== Chapels of St. Catherine and St. Charles Borromeo ====
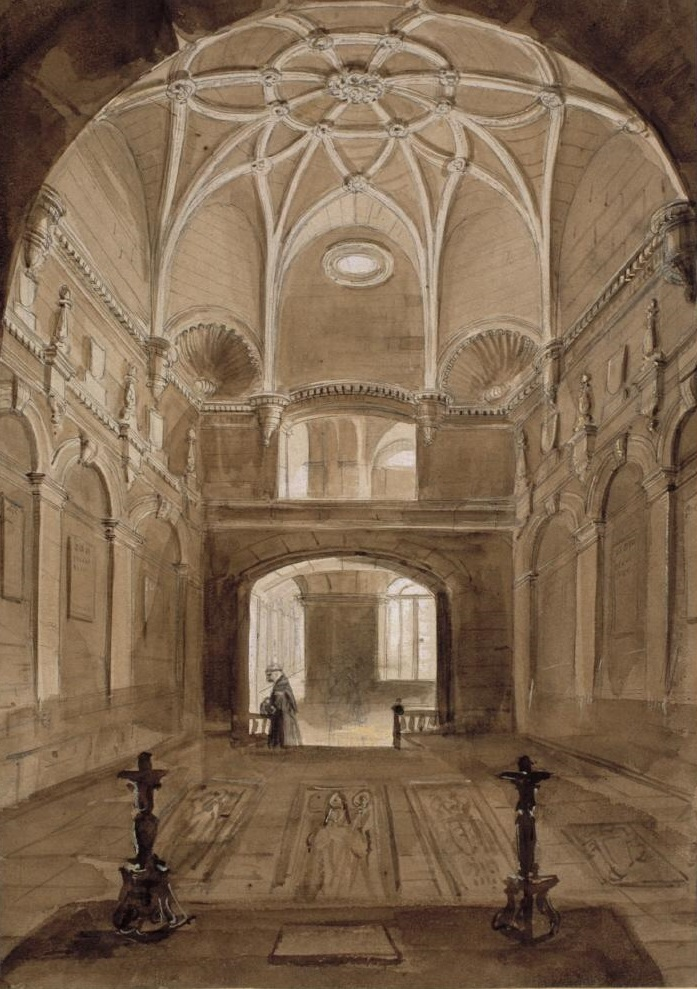
Nineteenth century engraving representing the chapel of Santa Catalina known as the Linajes, by Valentín Carderera.

Both chapels were located next to that of St. Francis, on the north wall of the church. Carlos de Venero y Leyva (chaplain of King Philip III and canon of the Cathedral of Toledo) obtained the patronage of these two chapels whose deeds for this concession date from 1602 and 1603 and are preserved in the Provincial Historical Archive of Valladolid. The one called the chapel of Santa Catalina must have been of great proportions and, according to Sobremonte:

[...] the most modern and the most elegant, majestic and neatest of the church.... [...]

In the same documents of the Archive, there is news about the masses and memorials for the soul of the sponsor and his relatives, and about the works to be carried out in the chapel for its improvement and ornamentation, all in charge of Carlos de Venero, who spent 26,829 reales in the works, plus liturgical trousseau (corporals, altar cloths, purificators, amitos, tisu fronts, chasubles, etc.) for a value of 535 ducats. To which must be added an altarpiece of St. Catherine, mentioned by Sobremonte at a cost of 600 ducats. The chapel of St. Charles Borromeo had no direct exit to the church and was like an appendix to the previous one, purchased and rebuilt by the same sponsor in 1624.

==== Sepulchers and other works ====
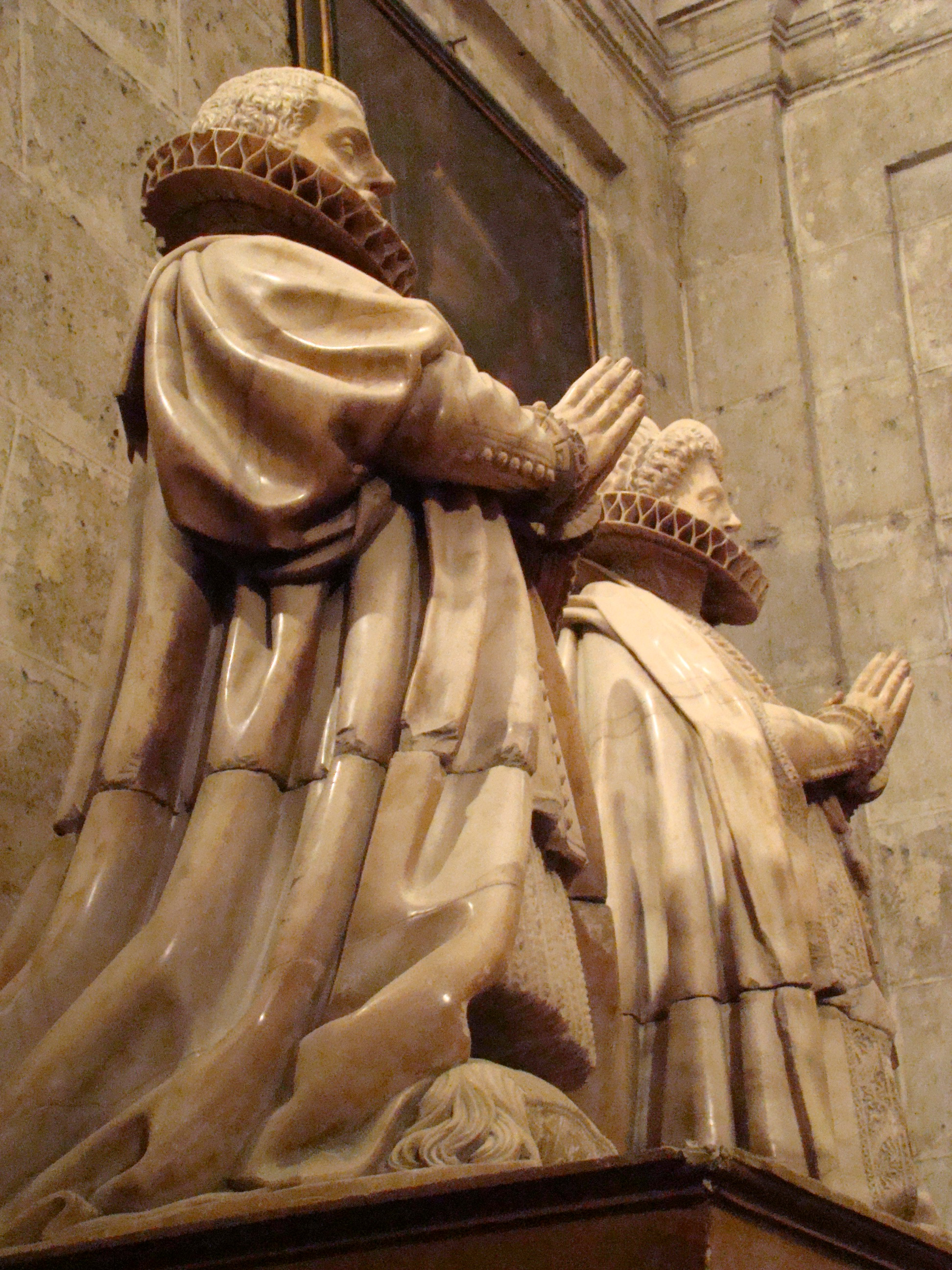
Funerary statues of the Venero-Leyva family. They are deposited in the cathedral of Valladolid.

Some of the most illustrious families of Valladolid were buried in this chapel, so it was known at one time as the chapel of the Lineages: the Mudarra, Ondergardo, Zárate, Venero and Leyva families. The burial bundles of this family (Leyva) were made by followers of the sculptor Pompeo Leoni and were catalogued in 1861 and transferred to the cathedral.

where you can see, along with the altarpiece and an image of St. Catherine made by Francisco de Rincón and other smaller images.

==== Chapel of St. Anthony the Poor ====
This chapel was located at the foot of the church, below the choir and its space included the area of two previous chapels called the Chapels of the Trinity and St. Anthony. It was remodeled and decorated in 1617. It also had the title of chapel of the Cañedos whose burials were in two plaster tombs under Gothic arches.

==== Chapel of St. Anne ====
It is known that after 1659 it was owned by three consecutive families. First it was bought by Casilda de Espinosa, who was married to the secretary of the Holy Office of the Inquisition, Diego Montero de Carrera. Then it passed into the hands of Juan de Para, accountant of S. M. to finally inherit it Sebastián Montero de Espinosa and Juana Durango de Quirós, lords of the town of Castroserna (Segovia). The chapel had two grilles, one facing the nave of the church and the other facing the nave de Santa Juana.

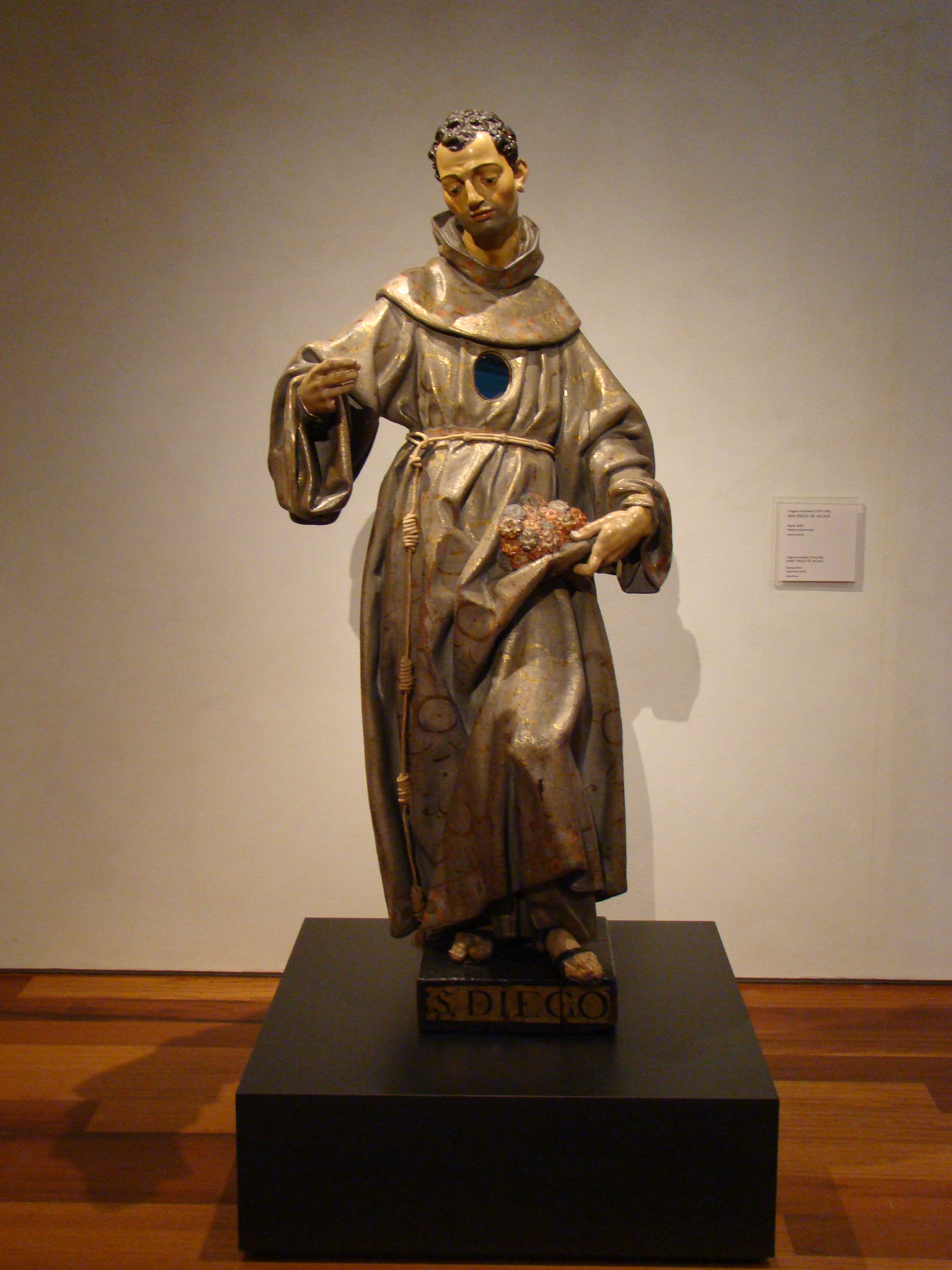
San Diego de Alcalá, titular of the chapel. It is in the Sculpture Museum of Valladolid.

==== Chapel of St. Diego ====
This chapel, like all those described below, was on the south wall facing the cloister to which it had access. Its protector was Diego de Escudero. It had an image of the patron saint of Didacus of Alcalá, the work of Gregorio Fernández.

==== Chapel of the Incarnation ====
There were two different chapels with the same dedication, although this one was previously called the chapel of Santiago. In the 17th century it was under the patronage of Clemente Formento, perpetual Alderman of Valladolid, who acquired it in 1622, undertaking restoration work and changing the owner. His coat of arms could be seen adorning the chapel. The description of this chapel is found in several documents so it has been possible to make a good exposition of all its components and the masters who intervened. (Note: García Chico in Arquitectura made the drawings of the entrance arch; AHPV leg. 1609, 1659, 1660.) The authors of the new traces were Francisco de Praves and Rodrigo de la Cantera. The access arch was built in stonework. The master masons were Pedro de Vega and Domingo del Rey. The altar was placed on the east wall while on the back wall there was a door leading to the cloister.

==== Grille ====
The chapel was enclosed by a grille made by Matías Ruiz from a wooden model that had been given to him. It had 32 balusters and sat on a stone podium; the cornice was made of wood.

==== Altarpiece ====
It was of a single body plus attic, with a large canvas of the Annunciation, supposedly the work of Diego Valentín Díaz. The altarpiece was gilded by the master Tomás de Prado, who also gilded the grille, according to documents in the Archives.

==== Chapel of Our Lady of Solitude ====
The first patronage of this chapel was by Pablo de la Vega whose portrait was hanging on one of the walls with a caption that read:

D. Paulus de la Vega Huius saceli primus patronus

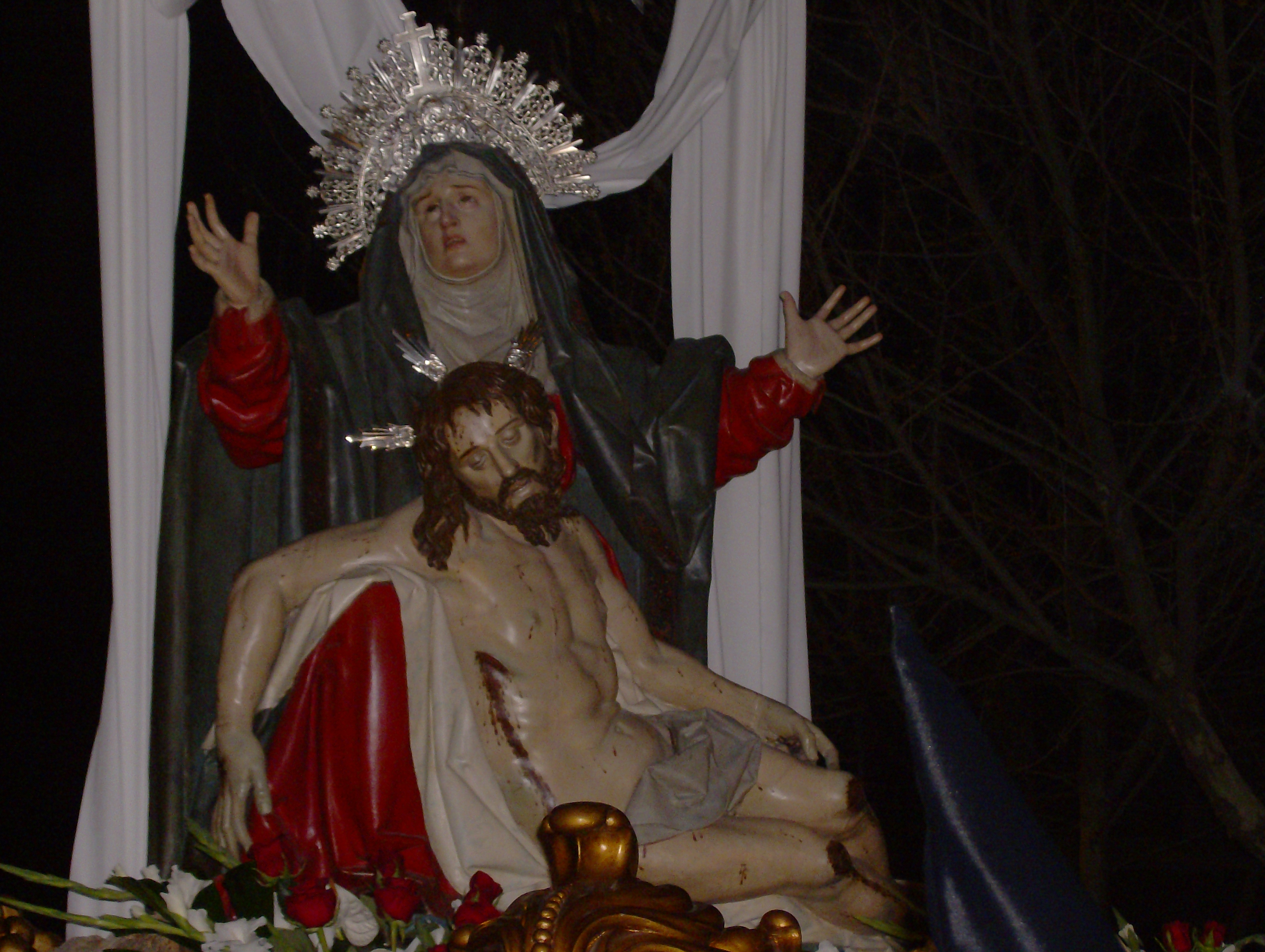
Fifth Anguish of Gregorio Fernández.

In 1590 Juan de Sevilla and his wife Ana de la Vega inherited the chapel. At that time the chapel was under the titular San Bernardino. In the 17th century it belonged to Francisco de Cárdenas, who commissioned the altarpiece dedicated to the Pietà, changing the dedication at the same time.

==== Altarpiece ====
The altarpiece and the sculptural group of the Pietà are the work of Gregorio Fernández and were moved after the disentailment to the church of San Martín de Valladolid, to the chapel whose patronage belonged to the Fresno de Galdo family of Valladolid. (Note: It consists of a bench with paintings of St. John the Baptist, St. Francis, St. Bernardino and the Magdalena. The main box is occupied by the high relief of the Pietà (known as the Fifth Anguish), work of Gregorio Fernandez. In the attic is the Imposición de la casulla a San Ildefonso, by the painter Diego Valentín Díaz.)

==== Chapel of the Holy Christ ====
It was located on the south wall of the church facing the cloister. In 1576 it was named after St. Andrew. The friars sold it to their family doctor (clergyman) Juan Rodríguez de Santamaría for a funeral chapel for him and his family. Juan Rodríguez restored and decorated it.

==== Inventory ====
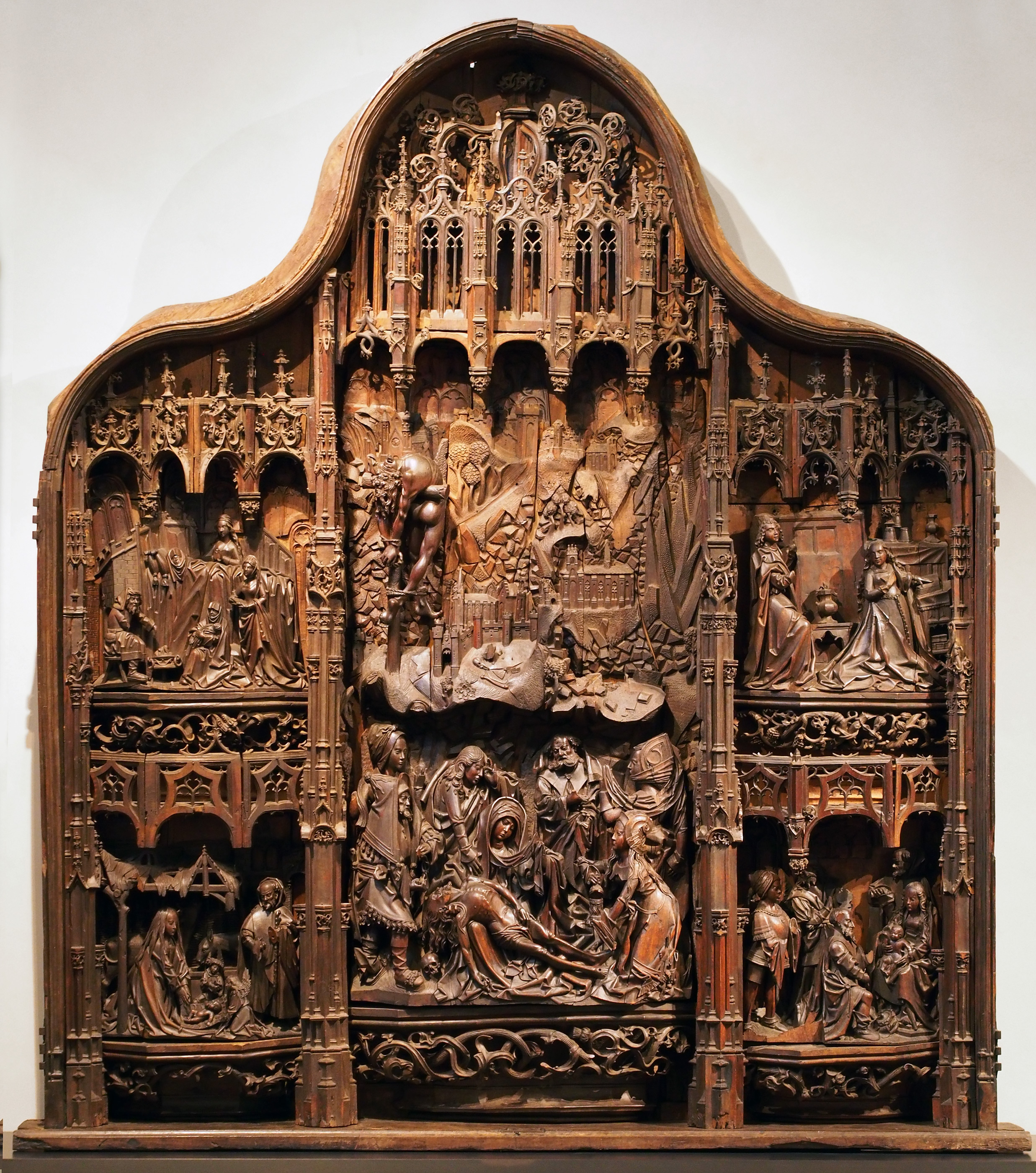
Anonymous brabazon. Altarpiece of the life of the Virgin, formerly called the Descent from the Cross. Around 1515.

According to Sobremonte, in this chapel there was a blank wooden altarpiece with small figures and with the theme of the Passion and death of Christ. This altarpiece has been identified with the one preserved in the National Museum of Sculpture, a Flemish triptych of unpainted walnut. The scholar Rafael de Floranes alludes to a large Christ placed in the "retablo del Crucifijo" (altarpiece of the Crucifix) that gave its name at some point to this chapel. Its whereabouts are unknown.

==== Chapel of the Incarnation ====
Second with this name, it was located below the choir and was previously dedicated to San Pablo. In the 16th century, the patron saint was Antonio de Frómista and his wife Juana de la Vega.

==== Choir ====
Until the 16th century the choir of the church was located in the presbytery, until the convent decided to remove it to build a new one on the top and at the foot of the temple. This choir loft had a choir stalls with two floors of seats that totaled 84, so that in some periods of the convent's life not all the monks could be seated, when they reached the number of 100. This old choir was executed by two Franciscan carvers, friars of this house and was replaced in 1735 by a new rococo style choir stalls whose carving work is due to Pedro de Sierra. It was placed and assembled by his brother Fray Jacinto de Sierra, with the help of other assemblers, as Ventura Pérez (who was also an assembler) reports in his Diario de Valladolid:

Year of 1735, day of St. Francis the choir stalls of the choir of his royal convent were premiered, although not completely perfected, that of all point was concluded on December 7 of said year. Juan de Soto, general minister of the whole order and son of this city and convent. Jacinto de Sierra, religious Recollect priest of the above mentioned order, son of the convent of the Abrojo; (Note: El Abrojo was an estate near Laguna de Duero (Valladolid), on the banks of the Douro River, where the Franciscans had a convent founded by San Pedro Regalado. The wall that surrounded the enormous extension is still preserved intact. In 2007, the land began to be divided into plots for private housing developments.) and of the officers who completed it, among the many who worked on it, were Tomás Rey, Manuel Villa, Manuel Mazariegos, Juan de Paredes, Manuel Conde, José García and myself, Ventura Pérez. May it be to the honor and glory of God and his divine worship.

==== Some news from historians about the choir ====
According to Canesi, the floor was made of brick and tiles and was paid for by the Gran Capitán, who had been a guest of the convent. In 1567, María de Mendoza, then widow of the secretary and banker of Charles V, Francisco de los Cobos, donated alms so that the friars could repair the vaults that had collapsed.

Sobremonte, in the 17th century, mentions another work that had to be done, securing the choir with two pilasters. This news is supported by the will of the master mason Pedro de Vega, in which he said that the convent "owed him money for the work done on the supporting pillars of the choir".

García Chico, in his work Documentos.... Pintores II (Valladolid 1956), says that in 1612 Diego Valentín Díaz painted a canvas to be placed between the two doors of the choir.

In 1740, according to Ventura Pérez, the image of the Immaculate Conception, the work of Pedro de Sierra, was still presiding over the choir.

==== 1809 Inventory ====
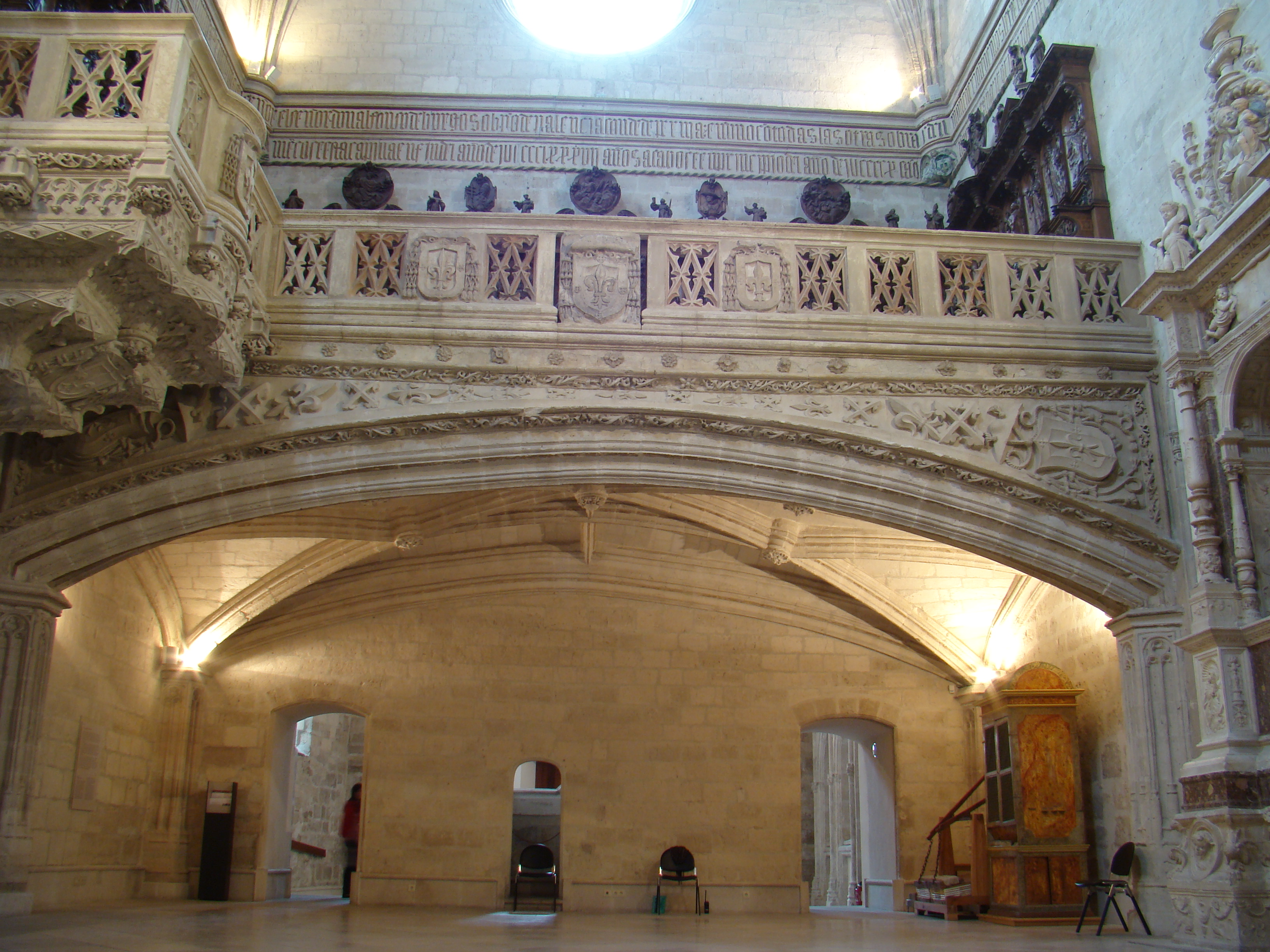
Mounted choir stalls in the choir loft of the chapel of Colegio de San Gregorio.

In the choir there was an altar called the altar of the Most Holy Christ of the Chapter; two organs, one larger than the other; a lectern adorned with the Ecce Homo; an urn where St. Francis de la Parrilla was venerated. The Inmaculada and some panels of the 1735 choir stalls are kept in the Sculpture Museum. A large part of the seats were mounted in the choir loft of the chapel of the Colegio de San Gregorio (seat of the National Museum of Sculpture).

==== Royal burials ====
- The infante Peter of Castile, son of Alfonso X the Wise and his wife, Violant of Aragon, who had died in the town of Ledesma on October 20, 1283. According to Antolínez de Burgos, the remains of the infante Pedro were in a niche placed on the Epistle side of the main chapel of the monastery church. However, Ambrosio de Morales affirmed that the tomb was in the so-called Chapel of the Lions, in a sepulcher placed high up, and on top of which were the recumbent statues of the infant Pedro and his wife.
- Henry of Castile "the Senator", son of Ferdinand III the Saint and brother of Alfonso X the Wise, who died in August 1303 in the town of Roa, Burgos, from where his body was brought. In the 16th century, the chronicler Ambrosio de Morales recorded that the exact place where the remains of the infante Enrique rested was unknown, although the writer Antolínez de Burgos stated that the remains of the infante were in a niche located in the main chapel of the monastery church, on the Gospel side.

==== Burials of other characters ====
- Pedro Álvarez, lord of Noreña, father of Rodrigo Álvarez de las Asturias, on whose tomb one could read some leonine verses that have been handed down in a manuscript history of the convent:

Serve Dei Francisce, mei sis dux morientis;

Do tibi me, tu sis animae comes egredientis.

In te confido placuitque mihi tuus ordo.

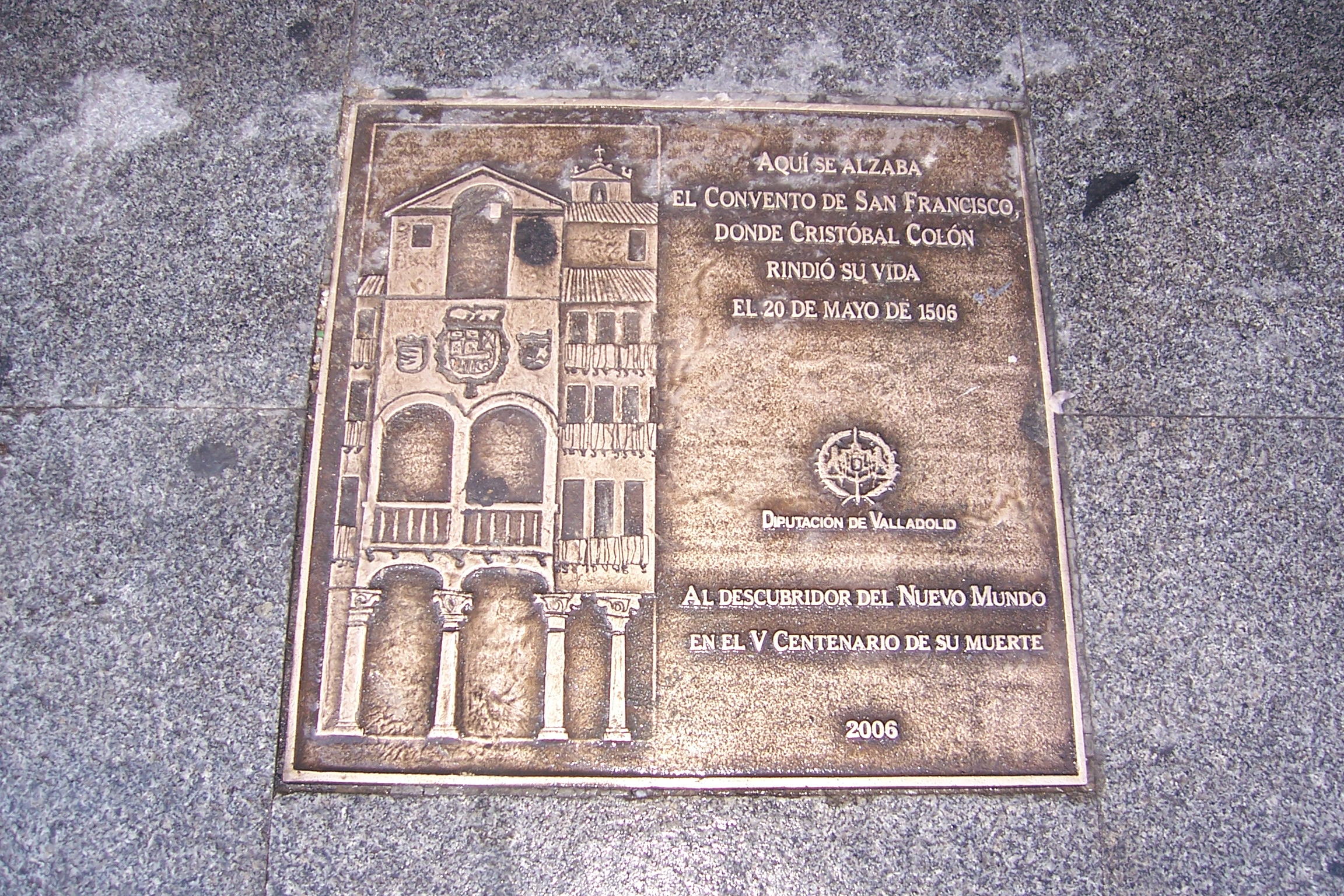
Commemorative plaque in honor of Columbus

The English translation of which reads as follows

Servant of God, Francis, be my guide in death;

For that to thee I give myself, accompany my soul

when I leave the world. In thee I trust,

and in the prudence of your rule I glory".

- Álvaro de Luna, beheaded in the Plaza Mayor of Valladolid and buried in this convent, according to his wishes. Later, his remains were transferred to the Toledo Cathedral (chapel of Santiago), along with the remains of his wife and members of his family.
- Christopher Columbus, whose remains were also moved (and on more than one occasion).
- María de Mendoza, VII Countess of Rivadavia.
- Red Hugh O'Donnell (Aodh Ruadh Ó Domhnaill), Lord of Tyrconnell (a Gaelic kingdom in Ireland). This Ulster chieftain died during a trip to Valladolid, being buried temporarily in the Castle of Simancas in 1602 and later transferred to the convent.
- Fray Alonso de Burgos (bishop of Palencia and promoter of the Colegio de San Gregorio).
- Juan Hurtado de Mendoza (14th century), one of the tutors of King Henry III.

=== Nave of Santa Juana (or San Diego) ===
It was built at the foot of the church, as long as the width of the church and perpendicular to the nave. It was like a real church, with a main altar and eight chapels distributed to the right and left. The chapels on the Epistle side were: San Diego; San Miguel; Santa Ana and Santo Cristo. The chapels on the Epistle side were: San Cosme and San Damián; Nuestra Señora la Blanca; San Juan Bautista and Nuestra Señora. It was entered from the cloister and served as a passageway to access the main entrance, which in turn overlooked the Plaza Mayor.

=== Chapel of the Executed or Chapel of the Holy Passion ===
It was located next to the nave of Santa Juana in the first patio as one entered through the main door. It was built in 1598, located, according to Sobremonte's comments:

[...] between the door of the church or nave of Santa Juana and the wall of the house of Baltasar de Paredes [...].

It had an altar with a Christ accompanied by the Virgin and John the Evangelist, where there was always a lighted candle. On the floor there were large burial slabs for the executed, except for those who had their throats slit, who were buried in the cloister. On the walls of the chapel ran an inscription that gave news of the patronage held by the Royal Penitential Brotherhood of Our Lady of the Passion and Saint John the Baptist beheaded and the indulgences granted by the bishop of Valladolid Juan Vigil de Quiñones for those who prayed in the chapel imploring for the souls of the deceased buried there. This is how it functioned for two centuries until the early years of the eighteenth century, when the building was remodeled at the request of Antonio Fernández, who, along with other pious people, gave alms for the work. The new construction was carried out by the master builder Joseph Gómez who left as alms the 12 reales that corresponded to him for doing the project.

Ventura Pérez in his Diario de Valladolid gives the news in 1752 of the construction of a new chapel next to the old one, for the burial of nobles and those killed by garrote, plus a space between the two chapels for the executed who are not quartered and their remains scattered along the roads, as was the custom for blood crimes.

=== Sacristy and resacristy ===
It was a rectangular enclosure, measuring 16.80 m by 7.28 m, built around 1574, which extended along Olleros Street with which it bordered and where three windows opened; on the opposite side the enclosure was attached to the main chapel and the chapel called the Chapel of the Lions. It was covered with a ribbed vault with terceletes and was well reinforced with buttresses. Next to it was the chapel-lavatory, also with a ribbed vault, and a little further on, behind the chancel of the church, was the chapel of San Bernardino, which served as a resacristy.

==== 1809 Inventory ====
The list of the movable and sumptuary goods of this estancia is quite extensive. Among many other objects, the following are described:

- Walnut drawers and table.
- Five full-length mirrors with decorated frames.
- Nine canvases with the images of San Buenaventura, San Pedro Regalado, Descendimiento, Purísima, Paso de los Azotes, San Joaquín, Inocencio XI, Clemente XIV, Cardenal Cánsate, and it is said that "all with their gilded frames". Nine or more other somewhat smaller paintings on different subjects and portraits.
- Holy Christ in ivory, catalogued in the National Museum of Sculpture (Valladolid) by Agapito y Revilla.
- Reliquary.
- A gilded chest, with crystals.
- A showcase with a clock and various silver pieces plus liturgical ornaments (10 chalices, a silver lamp, a tabernacle lined with silver, carpets, etc.).

=== Major cloister ===
It is known that the monastery had other cloisters or courtyards in addition to the main cloister itself, but their location and the use to which they were put is not very well known. The main cloister was located next to the south wall of the church. It was built at the end of the 15th century, rebuilt by Diego de Praves in 1595. In the 17th century it was adorned with a tile plinth and its floor was covered with geometric designs. It had canvases hanging from the walls about the life of St. Francis, the work of Felipe Gil de Mena. This painter worked a lot in this cloister not only with the realization of the large canvases but also painting the lunettes of the vaults. Another painter was Fray Diego de Frutos, a layman of the convent who in the 18th century painted the life of St. Pedro Regalado. (Note: This work is preserved in the collections of the Sculpture Museum, as well as some of Gil de Mena's paintings.) In 1641, the painter Blas de Cervera took over the painting of the lower cloister with stories from the life of St. Francis.

==== Chapel of Santa Cruz ====
Also called the chapel of the Santisteban, one of the most notable families of Valladolid.l Historians place this chapel next to that of the Counts of Cabra. The old books of the convent say that it served as a primitive church for the community when the other one had not yet been built.

==== Chapel of the Porziuncola ====
According to Sobremonte, it was located on the second side of the cloister. It belonged to the Vitoria family who held the patronage in the figure of the treasurer Luis de Vitoria who invested a lot of money in fixing it up, putting a grille, an altarpiece from 1622 and decorations, including their coats of arms on the walls. The chapel had two good railings, one separating it from the church and the other from the cloister. On his death, his daughter Antonia de Vitoria inherited the chapel.

==== Chapel of the Counts of Cabra ====
It had different names through the years:

- Chapel of St. Anthony
- Chapel of the Conception
- Chapel of Las Maravillas
- Chapel of the Counts of Cabra
- Chapel of the Conception (and at the same time of the Reliquary and the Communion rail).

It was located in the area around the cloister and, according to the historian Canesi, in the dark passageway on the right hand side of the main chapel.

==== Patronage ====
It is known that at the beginning of the 16th century, Luis de la Cerda (Lord of Villora) and his wife Francisca de Castañeda were the patrons of the chapel. Their granddaughter Francisca de la Cerda Zúñiga y Castañeda married the III Count of Cabra, named Diego Fernández de Córdoba; the couple obtained again the patronage and since then gave name to the chapel.

In 1617 the patronage reverted to the convent. It was in this year when the famous Inmaculada de Gregorio Fernández was placed in this chapel, first of the series of Inmaculadas made by this sculptor, sought by historians and researchers and that is in unknown whereabouts. In the 18th century the friars ceded the patronage to Lope de Quevedo, to whom they apparently owed many favors.

==== The Confraternity of the Conception ====
The Confraternity of Our Lady of the Pure and Clean Conception had its headquarters in the convent, where they held their religious festivities, chapters and meetings. In 1617 the community ceded to this confraternity the chapel of the Counts of Cabra, once again called de la Concepción, so that from then on they could hold all their events there. For the occasion, the friars provided an image of the Immaculate Conception that they had previously commissioned from the sculptor Gregorio Fernandez, who was a member of the confraternity. The community also offered a silver lamp. The friars, however, were very insistent in the contract that they would always retain ownership of this sculpture and other objects they mention:

[...] because everything that is given and acquired after the foundation of the said confraternity is given and offered to the image of Our Lady and not to the confraternity [...] excluding what the confraternity and confreres have put of their property [...].

The deed of the contract also stated that the feasts of the Immaculate Conception and the Feast of the Dead were to be celebrated in the chapel. The friars also granted another location for the meetings and meetings, a room that was next to the main balcony overlooking the square. For all this, the confraternity committed itself to pay an annual alms of 200 reales and committed itself to bury all the religious of the convent. Later there was a new agreement by which the confraternity said that it was satisfied for its meetings with "... the room where theology is read [...] where up to now the chapter meetings have been held and are held [...]", and in exchange they declined the obligation to bury the friars.

==== The image of the Immaculate Conception ====
It is known that in November 1617 Gregorio Fernández had already finished this image, the first of the series that he would later make throughout his life from future commissions. In 1618 the Brotherhood of the Conception commissioned an altarpiece to place it and the convent commissioned its gilding to the famous and highly praised painter Tomás de Prado, dated June 16, 1619.

In 1622 the community commissioned a new altarpiece for its main chapel and moved the Inmaculada by Gregorio Fernández to the central box. In its place, in the chapel of the Counts of Cabra, they installed another Inmaculada, the work of Francisco de Rincón.

In the 1809 inventory, this image by Gregorio Fernández is described:

[...] the throne of the Immaculate Conception, with its image that has its bronze crown, with its arches with silver rays, some gilded and in the arches several embedded stones. Behind this throne there is a kind of dressing room [...].

As already mentioned, this image is unaccounted for and is one of the great speculative topics among Spanish art historians.

=== Chapel of the Bishop of Mondoñedo ===
It is also called the Chapel of the Sepulchre because it houses this sculptural work by Juan de Juni. There are many authors who give data on this chapel and there are several documents on contracts for masonry and carpentry work and artists' contracts. (Note: Father Sobremonte, the traveler and writer Isidoro Bosarte, the historians Ponz and Matías Sangrador relate many details, to which we must add the research of Martí and Monsó (1992), p=354) and the studies carried out at the end of the 20th century by J. J. Martín González, J. Urrea and M. A. Fernández del Hoyo, the main researcher.)

The chapel was built at the request of Fray Antonio de Guevara (Franciscan, died in 1545), bishop of Mondoñedo, writer and chronicler of Charles V, as a burial chapel. The place of construction was "in the dark passage between the cloister and the sacristy", in the area where the chapel of the Count of Cabra was. A small cloister was also built preceding it. Fray Antonio de Guevara also financed the construction of two other cloisters. In one of the contracts it can be read about the carpenter Pedro de Salamanca who is required to:

[...] to make 4 cloisters, which are the 3 cloisters and for the room towards the refectory I have to make a cut in the wall of the refectory so that it fits the height of the sill [...] and more I have to make a vestibule [...].

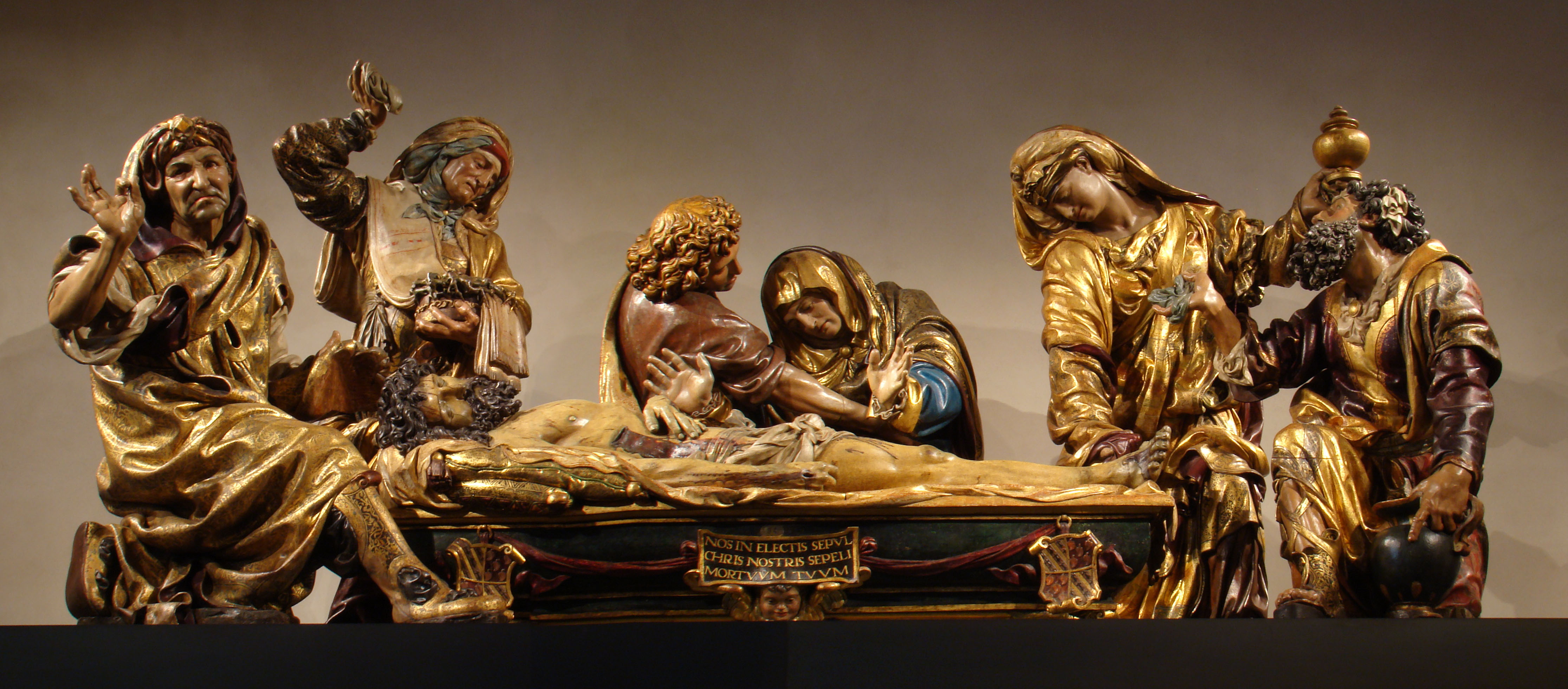
The Burial of Christ by Juan de Juni.

It was designed by the sculptor Juan de Juni, with a square floor plan and with a headwall in which there would be an altarpiece with the great work of this sculptor, The Burial of Christ, today in the National Museum of Sculpture. The altarpiece and the entire chapel were adorned with plasterwork by Jerónimo del Corral.

In 1686 the chapel must have been somewhat aged because the gilder Manuel Martínez de Estrada was required to clean it and restore the gilding and paintings, repairing and consolidating the deterioration and detachments. In this restoration contract, all the elements are extensively detailed and it is thus known that the chapel was adorned with cartouches, fleurons, masks, shells, garlands, angels, seraphs, saints and other sculptures, both half and full-length.

==== 1809 Inventory ====
He cites mainly the work of the Burial of Christ, by Juan de Juni, and an apostolate located on the walls.

=== Chapel of the Venerable Third Order ===
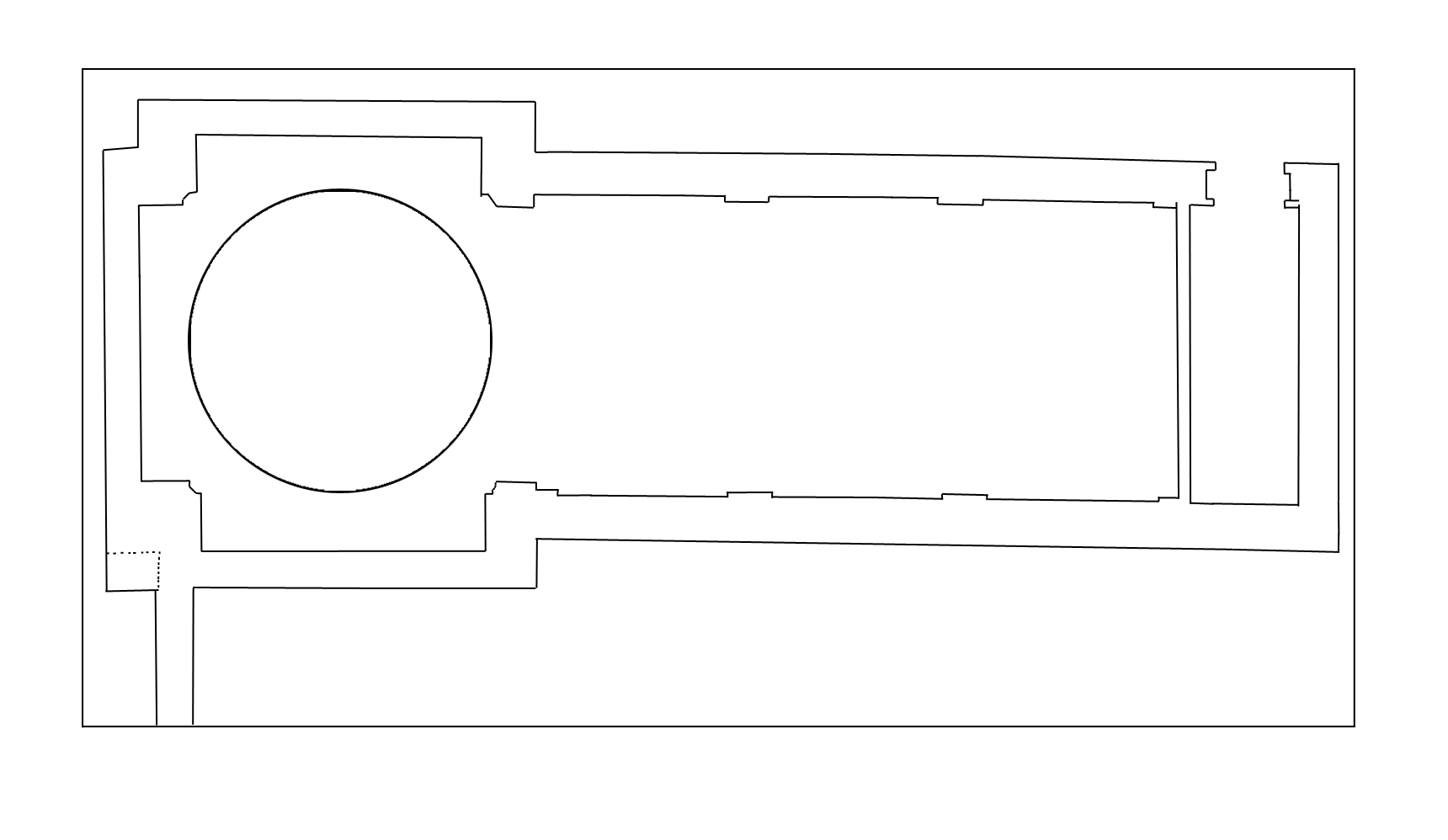
Plan of the chapel of the Venerable Third Order by architect Juan de Répide (1654).

From 1609 onwards, the convent became the seat for the spiritual life of the Third Order (V.O.T.), composed of a congregation of people of both sexes and varied social status. In the convent all the social and religious acts of this community were carried out. Until 1620, this brotherhood used to meet for its activities in various chapels of the convent, until the friars sold them some land near the nave of Santa Juana and a large room that had served as a guest house for the laity. In this area the chapel and other rooms were built around 1622 (the work of the master masons and carpenters Domingo del Rey and Antonio de Morales is known, being the project or design of the architect Francisco de Praves). The expansion work continued in 1626 when they obtained, in exchange for alms, a little more space next to the chapel, where they would build the sacristy. In 1654 there was a new enlargement under the direction and project of the architect Juan de Répide (Note: In the A.H.P.V. (leg. 1562, fol 1233), the deeds and the drawing of the church plan, the work of Juan de Répide, are preserved. From this contract we can know exactly the dimensions of the new floor plan and its distribution.) and the church was rebuilt with the inscription:

To the honor and glory of God and the Blessed Virgin Mary N. S. conceived without original sin, and N. P. S. Francisco, this Chapel was rebuilt and adorned, with the alms that the brothers of the Third Order of Penance gave for it, being minister of it, the brother Andrés García, year of 1655.

After the enlargement, it ended up being a real church, 25.20 m long and 7.84 m wide in the nave, plus 9.80 m wide in the main chapel. The sacristy was located on the Gospel side. The body of the church was divided into 3 sections and the roof was vaulted and made of brick. The floor was also of brick. The walls were whitewashed. In 1675 the painter Antonio de Noboa Osorio covered them with paintings, and also took care of the gilding and decoration in many other parts of the church (vaults, lunettes, arches, windows, etc.). A few years earlier Diego Valentín Díaz had painted the pendentives. Sobremonte and Father Calderón describe the result of all these works, giving the impression of a baroque ensemble rich in themes and colors. They also give an account of the furnishings and the different existing areas: two side altars, a choir with organ, a sacristy with rich ornaments, a pulpit and a small garden.

The first main altarpiece (which burned in 1710) was, according to Sobremonte, "all of it an ember of gold". It was made by the assembler Antonio Villota, with Solomonic columns and was divided in two bodies and three streets. An image of the Immaculate Conception was placed in the central box. The second altarpiece was made by the gilders Claudio and Cristóbal Martínez de Estrada.

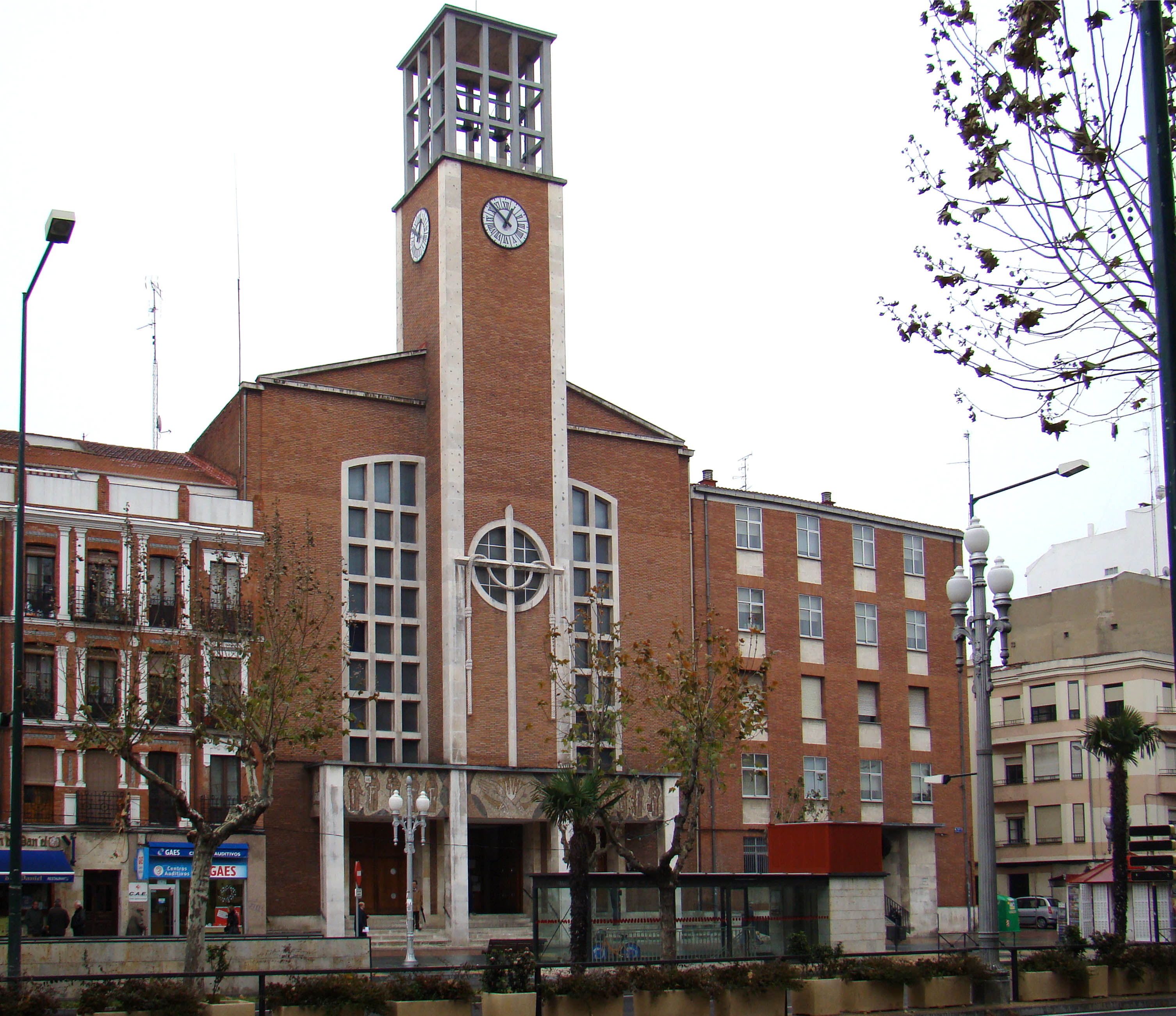
Immaculate Conception Parish.

== The convent in the 21st century ==
Nothing of what was the huge enclosure of this Convent of St. Francis remains in the memory of the Valladolid citizens of the 21st century. The new streets opened on its site do not evoke to the passerby what was built there a century ago. Only the so-called Acera de San Francisco has remained as a memory, to designate the section of the arcades of the Plaza Mayor, but not officially but as a tradition in people of an already advanced age who heard it named this way in their childhood. The Franciscans have resided since the middle of the 20th century in Paseo de Zorrilla nº 27 where they have the church-parish of the Immaculate Conception. It is a modern building designed by the Valladolid architect Julio González Martín.

== See also ==
- Franciscans
- Order of Friars Minor Conventual

== Bibliography ==
- Agapito y Revilla, Juan (1937). Las calles de Valladolid. Nomenclátor histórico (in Spanish). Imprenta Casa Martín. OCLC 638888657.
- Agapito y Revilla, Juan (1986a). "La leyenda del convento de San Francisco". Boletín de la Sociedad Castellana de Excursiones (in Spanish). Vol. 6. Valladolid: Grupo Pinciano, edición facsímil. ISBN 84-505-3630-8.
- Agapito y Revilla, Juan (1986b). "De la fundación del convento de San Francisco, de Valladolid". Boletín de la Sociedad Castellana de Excursiones (in Spanish). Vol. 6. Valladolid: Grupo Pinciano, edición facsímil. ISBN 84-505-3630-8.
- Alcalde Prieto, Domingo (1986). Manual Histórico de Valladolid (in Spanish). Grupo Pinciano, edición facsímil. ISBN 84-87739-28-8.
- Altés, José (1998). La plaza Mayor de Valladolid (in Spanish). Valladolid: Ayuntamiento de Valladolid. ISBN 84-86808-90-1.
- Antolínez de Burgos, Juan (1987). Historia de Valladolid (in Spanish). Valladolid: Grupo Pinciano, edición facsímil. ISBN 84-505-6863-3.
- del Arco y Garay, Ricardo (1954). Sepulcros de la Casa Real de Castilla (in Spanish). Madrid: Instituto Jerónimo Zurita. Spanish National Research Council. OCLC 431265707.
- Canesi Acevedo, Manuel (1996). Historia de Valladolid (1750), tomo I. (in Spanish). Valladolid: Grupo Pinciano, edición facsímil. ISBN 84-87739-59-8.
- Fernández del Hoyo, María Antonia (1998). Patrimonio perdido. Conventos desaparecidos de Valladolid (in Spanish). Valladolid: Ayuntamiento de Valladolid. ISBN 84-86808-72-3.
- Fernández del Hoyo, María Antonia (2009). "Platería americana en el convento de San Francisco, de Valladolid". BSAA (in Spanish). 75. Universidad de Valladolid: 215–222. ISSN 0210-9573.
- Madoz, Pascual (1984). Diccionario Geográfico-Estadístico-Histórico de España (in Spanish). Valladolid: Edición facsímil. ISBN 84-86047-34-X.
- Mañueco Villalobos, Manuel; Zurita Nieto, José (1917). Documentos de la Iglesia Colegial de Santa María la Mayor de Valladolid. Siglos Siglo XI y Siglo XII. Vol. I. Valladolid: Sociedad de Estudios Históricos Castellanos. OCLC 977645654.
- Martí y Monsó, José (1992). Estudios histórico-artísticos relativos principalmente a Valladolid. Basados en la investigación de diversos archivos (in Spanish) (2nd ed.). Valladolid: Edición facsímil. Ámbito, S.A. ISBN 84-86770-74-2.
- de Nicolás, Antonio (1984). Boletín de la Sociedad Castellana de Excursiones. Tomo I 1903-1904 (in Spanish). Valladolid: Grupo Pinciano. Edición facsímil. ISBN 84-7231-752-8.
- Pérez, Ventura (1983). Diario de Valladolid (1885) (in Spanish). Valladolid: Grupo Pinciano. Edición facsímil. ISBN 84-7231-944-X.
- Quadrado, José María (1989). Valladolid, historia, monumentos, artes y naturaleza (in Spanish). Valladolid: Grupo Pinciano. Edición facsímil. ISBN 84-505-8594-5.
- Quadrado, José María; Parcerisa, Francisco Javier (1990). Recuerdos y bellezas de España. Valladolid (in Spanish). Valladolid: Edición facsímil. Ámbito. ISBN 84-86770-37-8.
- Urueña Paredes, Juan Carlos (2006). Rincones con fantasmas. Un paseo por el Valladolid desaparecido (in Spanish). Valladolid: Ayuntamiento de Valladolid. ISBN 84-95389-97-5.
