= Juan Antolínez de Burgos =

Juan Antolínez de Burgos (1561–1644) was a Spanish historian and writer. He wrote Historia de Valladolid.

Juan Antolínez de Burgos was born in 1561, the year of the Great Fire of Valladolid. Little is known about his personal life. He may have been brother of Justin Antolínez of Burgos, vicar general and vicar official archbishopric of Granada in 1594. He studied at the University of Valladolid, where he obtained a degree in law. He worked as a lawyer in the Royal Chancery of Valladolid and in 1613 was appointed alderman of the city, taking office on January 2, 1616.

In 1644, at the age of eighty-three, he finished a manuscript called A History of Valladolid, which is preserved in the National Library of Spain in Madrid. In 1759 this work was expanded and consolidated by Ventura Pérez in his History of the most noble and loyal city of Valladolid, collected from several authors, in two manuscript volumes which are still unpublished. (Ventura Perez enriched the work, adding illustrations on the covers of many interesting buildings in Valladolid; these drawings have been of great help to art historians of the twentieth and twenty-first centuries.)

Antolínez's manuscript belonged to Rafael de Floranes, who marked heavily in the margins and added pages and even entire sheets. This copy went to the library of the Duke of Osuna and from there to the National Library under the symbol Mn. 284.

The work describes extensively the churches, convents, chapels, tombs, inscriptions and coats of arms of Valladolid; describing the facts and events that each has witnessed, even including anecdotes, ghost stories, miracles and legends. It also includes effigies of saints, religious and secular traditions, reports of important people and their motives. It deals extensively with the church of Santa Maria Magdalena, which was reconstructed in part by Petro de la Gasca, winner of the rebellion of Peru, who is also buried in the church. It also explores the Church of Saint Mary the Ancient and the magnificent convent of San Francisco. It does not cover many public buildings or private residences, though it occasionally references the palaces of the Admirals of Castile, the Constables, the Ansúrez, and other famous people.

The work was edited with notes and corrections in the nineteenth century by J. Ortega and Rubio (Valladolid: Imp and National Bookstore and Foreign Rodriguez Sons, 1887). A modern edition has also been published (Valladolid: Pinciano Group – Provincial Savings Bank, 1989).
