= Diego Valentín Díaz =

Spanish painter

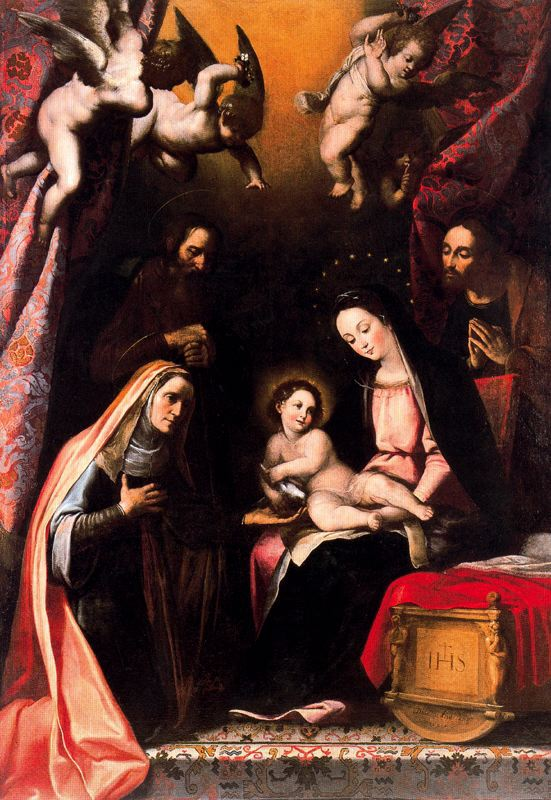
Holy Family, ca. 1650, now in the National Museum of Sculpture in Valladolid

Diego Valentín Díaz (died 1660) was a Spanish historical painter and a familiar of the Holy Office. He was a native of Valladolid. Díaz painted many important pictures for churches and monasteries, especially for the former Church of San Benito (now a barrack), and the convents of St. Jerome and of St. Francis, of which the Jubilee of the Porciuncula in the latter house was one of the most esteemed.

His Holy Family, painted for San Benito, is now in the National Museum of Sculpture, Valladolid; what is considered his best work is an altarpiece of the Annunciation of the Virgin, painted for the Hospital for Orphan Girls he had founded at Valladolid. The architecture and perspective are in the finest style, and the statues introduced are admirably executed. Díaz died at Valladolid in 1660. He accumulated considerable wealth, the greater part of which he left for the support of this hospital, at which site he was buried, and where are preserved the portraits of the munificent artist and of his wife – "he a grey-haired sharp old man, she a dark-eyed dame."

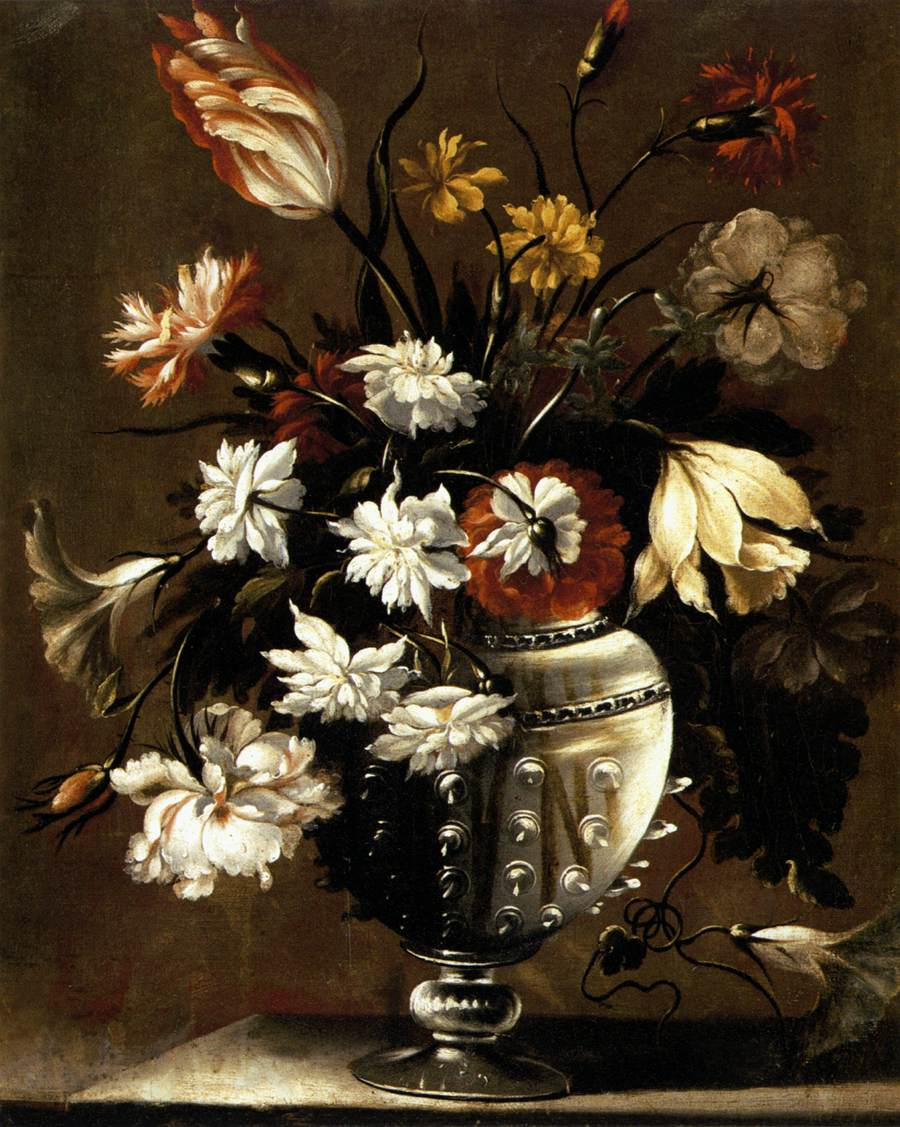
Flowers, ca. 1650, now at the Museo Diocesano y Catedralicio in Valladolid
