= Diego Díez Ferreras =

17th-century Spanish painter and metalworker

Diego Díez Ferreras (? –1697) was a Spanish baroque painter and metalworker, originally from Carmona (Seville) but active in Valladolid, where he is documented from 1662 until his death.

== Biography ==
In 1662 Díez was already established in Valladolid, where he received Manuel Osorio as an apprentice, perhaps a relative of Inés Osorio whom he would later marry, as witnessed by the sculptor Francisco Díez de Tudanca.

Among his first works, the canvases he painted for the altarpiece of the Church of the Holy Cross, in Medina de Rioseco, dedicated to the life of Emperor Constantine, around 1666, stand out.

Lacking technical resources and unable to provide movement to his groups, despite frequently addressing poorly treated or completely unpublished iconography, Díez frequently resorted to foreign prints, as can be seen, for example, in the paintings dedicated to the assumption of Mary in the main altarpiece of Laguna de Duero, from the convent of San Francisco in Valladolid, and the Collegiate Church of San Antolín in Medina del Campo, signed in Valladolid in 1682, inspired by an engraving of a composition by Rubens.

The canvas Preparations for the Martyrdom of Saint Sebastian is attributed to him.

The series of eight oil paintings is embedded in the vault of the English College (Valladolid) of the story of Our Lady Vulnerata (desecrated during the sacking of Cádiz by the English in 1596).

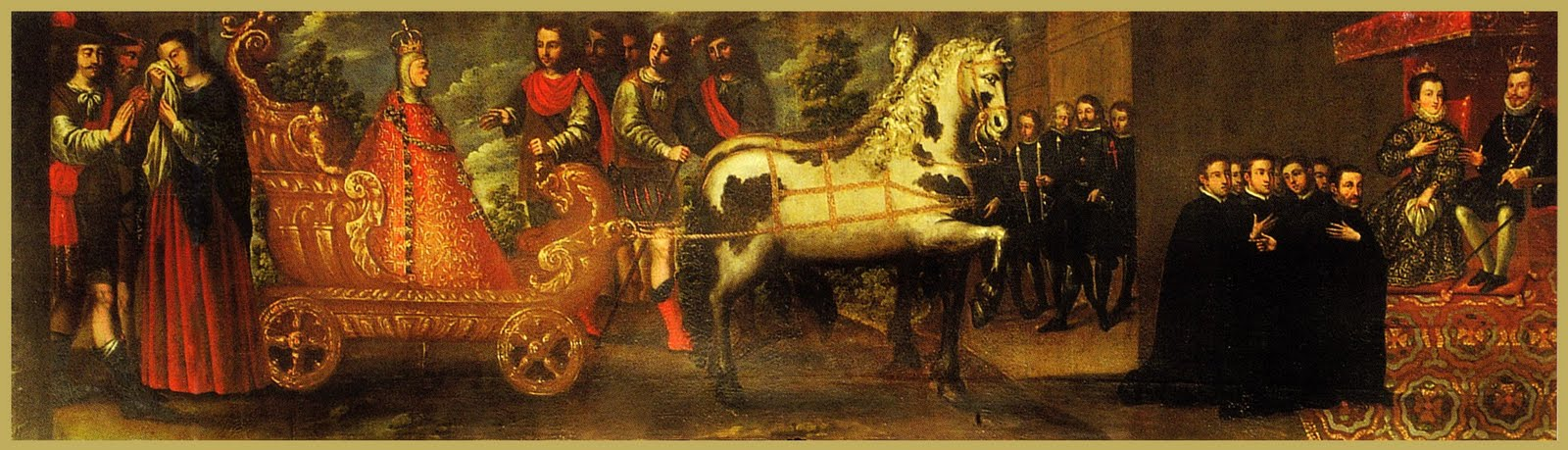
Llegada de la Virgen Vulnerata a Valladolid, church of the English College, Valladolid. The canvas, painted around 1679, represents the arrival in Valladolid, in 1600, of an image of the Virgin desecrated during the sack of Cádiz by the English in 1596.
