= Fuentes de Valdepero =

Coordinates: 42°04′N 4°30′W

- municipality
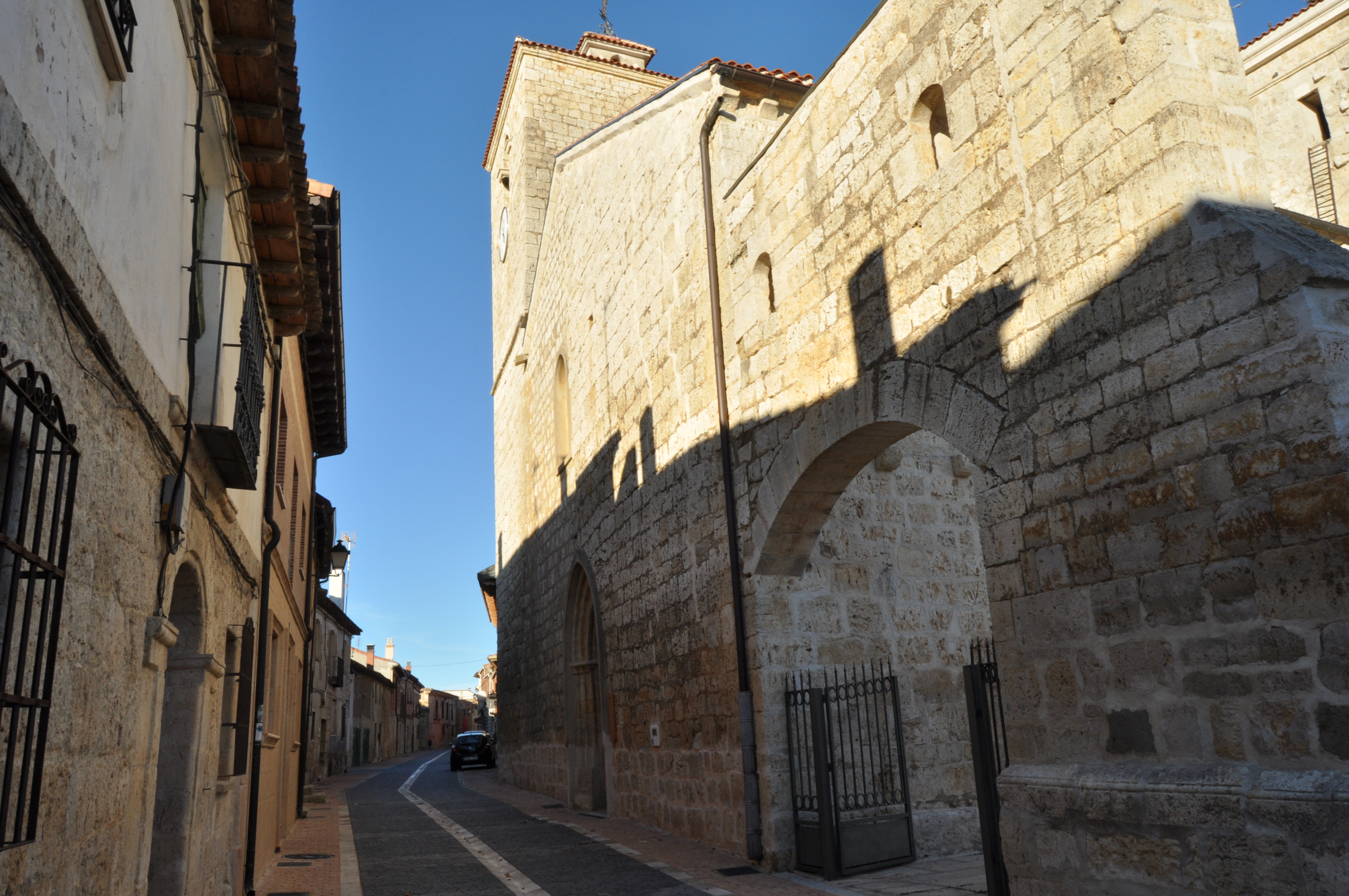

- Flag Coat of arms
- Interactive map of Fuentes de Valdepero
- Country: Spain
- Autonomous community: Castile and León
- Province: Palencia
- Municipality: Fuentes de Valdepero

Area
  - Total: 42 km^{2} (16 sq mi)
- Elevation: 801 m (2,628 ft)

Population (2025-01-01)
  - Total: 489
  - Density: 12/km^{2} (30/sq mi)
- Time zone: UTC+1 (CET)
  - Summer (DST): UTC+2 (CEST)
- Website: Official website

Fuentes de Valdepero is a municipality located in the province of Palencia, Castile and León, Spain.

It has a population of 429.

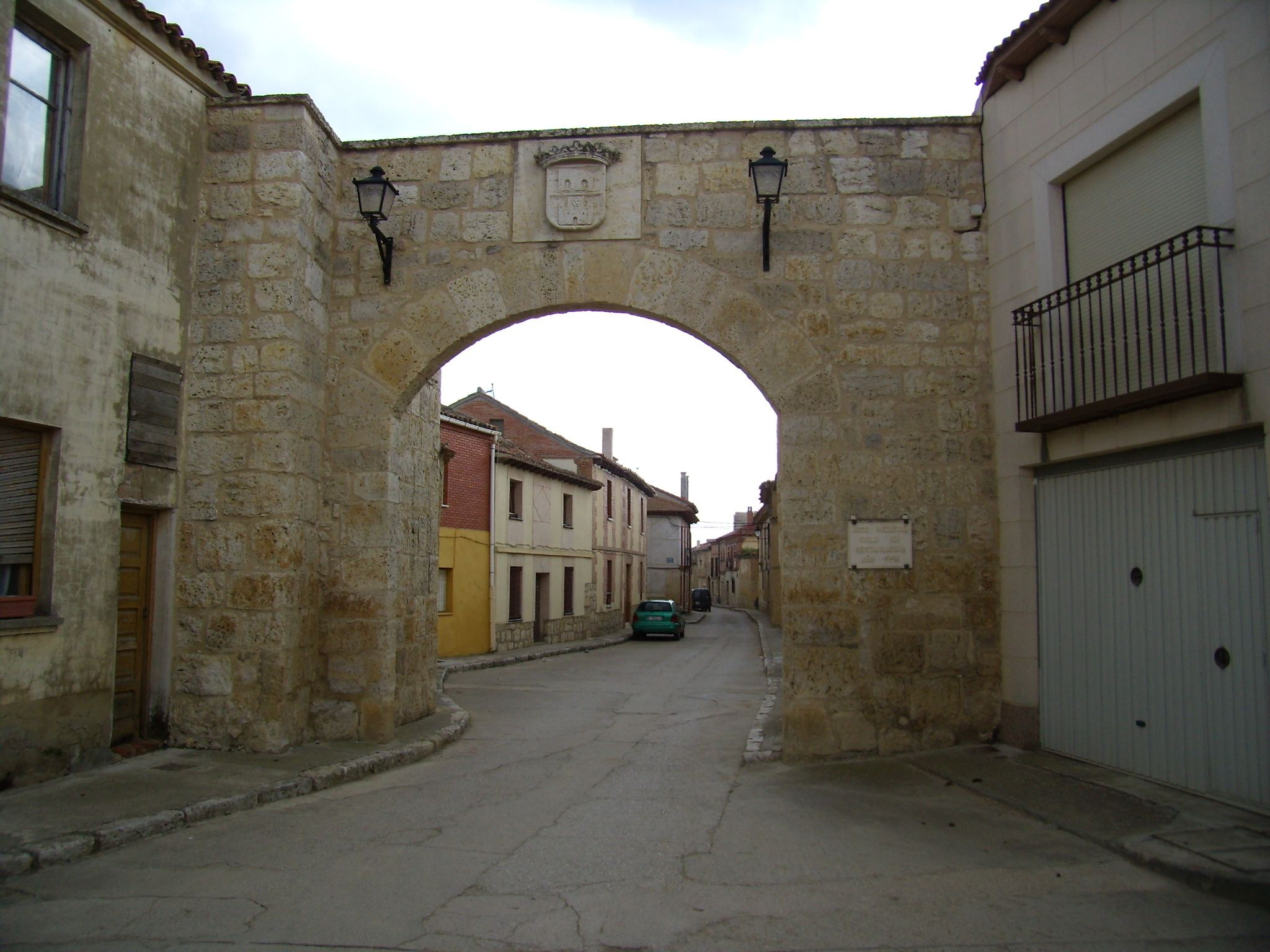
Entrance of the ancient city walls of Fuentes de Valdepero.

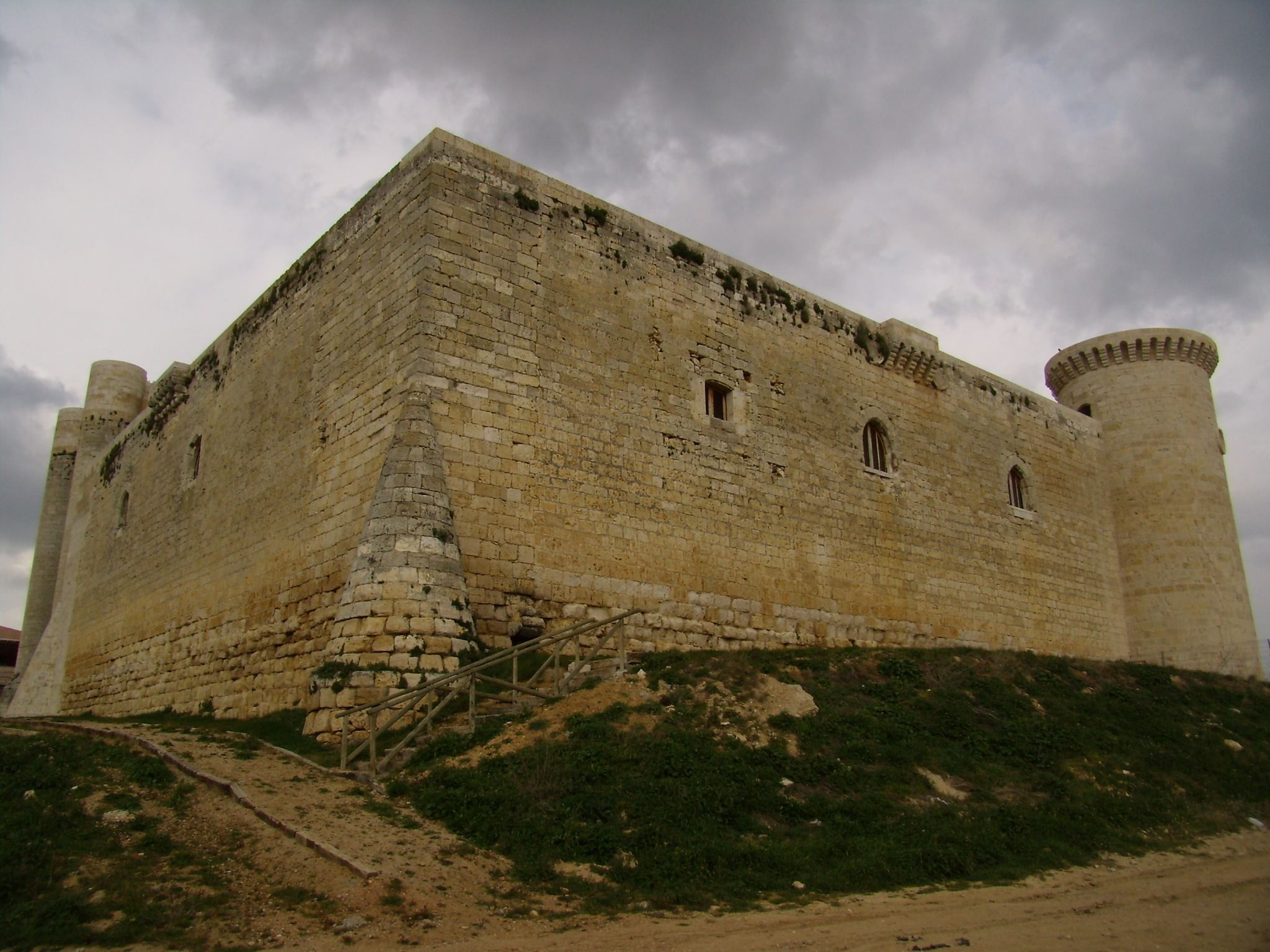
The Castle of Fuentes de Valdepero.
