= Rafael de Floranes =

Rafael de Floranes or de Floranes Vélez de Robles y Encinas (1743, Camaleño – 1801, Valladolid, Spain) was a Spanish historian, jurist and writer.

== Works ==
- Historical Records of Spanish law from the earliest times to the present.
- Memories of King Alonso VIII.
- Lives of the most famous Spanish jurists before the sixteenth century, with a story critical of his works.
- Glorias select the MN and ML province of Álava .
- Catalog of former governors of the province of Álava.
- Antiques and memories of the MN and ML province of Álava.
- Misused Armentia Headquarters by the bishops of Calahorra in the year 1089.
- New occupation, lasting in the day, the bishopric of Armentia by D. Rodrigo Cascante, Bishop of Calahorra, between the years 1183 and 1189, and acts of resistance in the provinces of Álava, Vizcaya and Guipúzcoa against the bishops of Calahorra, its intrusion into the chair alavense.
- Restoring Armentia chair in 1181.
- The Law of Sepúlveda, Original Dei copied and illustrated with notes and dissertations.
- Sum of the laws of Master James, with notes
- Historical Memories of Master Jacob.
- A copy of the Law I judge, collated with seven ancient manuscripts, and removed the variants.
- Additions and supplements to the amortization of Mr. Campomanes .
- Memories and Notes for the history of Valladolid.
- Historical Records of the universities of Castilla, especially those of Valladolid and Palencia, work entirely finished, in a folio volume.
- Memories and pointings for the Toro .
- Chancellor's literary life of Castile Don Pedro Lopez de Ayala, restorer of letters in Castile, printed in the collection of unpublished documents in the history of Spain, Madrid: Printing Calero's widow, 1851, p. XIX.
- Handwritten Life and Works of Dr. Lorenzo Galindez de Carvajal .
- Historical Memoirs of the University of Castilla.
- Apuntamientos curious about Behetrías, status and privileges, and how they do in the affiliations.
- Don Rafael Floranes Apuntamientos Father Fray Francisco Mendez, of the order of St. Augustine, a resident of the convent of San Felipe el Real de Madrid, for a treatise on the origin of Printing, introduction, propagation and first productions in Spain rest of the fifteenth century of his birth. Year 1794, included in the Spanish print of Francisco Mendez .
- Philosophical discourses (manuscript composed in 1800).
- "Two unpublished tracts Floranes Rafael D. and D. Thomas Antonio Sanchez on the Origins of Spanish poetry, with a preliminary Warning Marcelino Menéndez y Pelayo "(taken from the Revue Hisfanique, volume XVIII, New-York, Paris, 1908 .
