= Holy Week in Valladolid =

Cultural and religious events in Valladolid, Spain

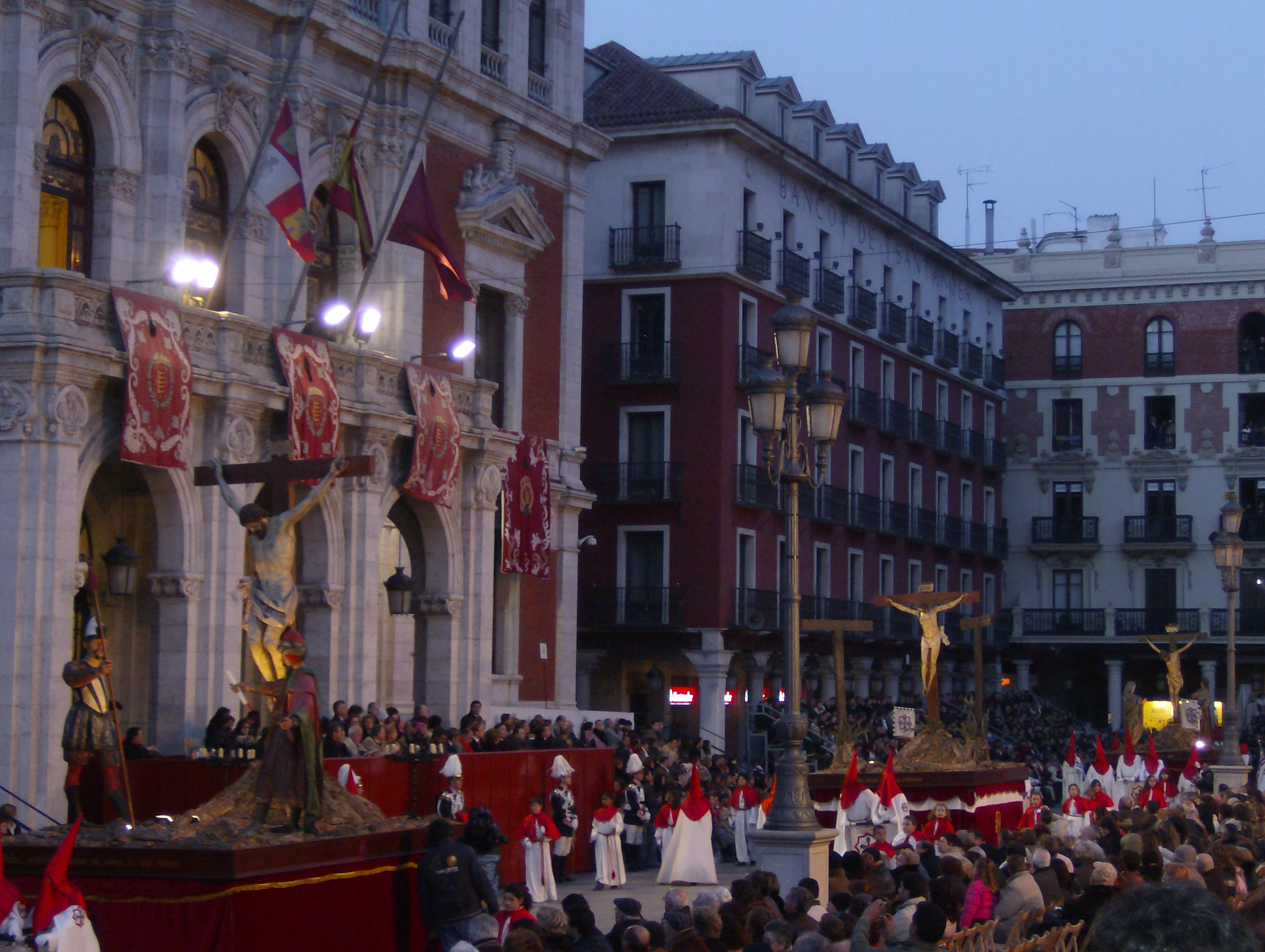
- Procession in Plaza Mayor
- Official name: Semana Santa de Valladolid
- Observed by: Valladolid, Spain
- Type: Religious, Historical, Cultural
- Significance: Commemoration of the passion, death and resurrection of Jesus
- Celebrations: Processions
- Begins: Palm Sunday
- Ends: Easter Sunday
- 2025 date: April 13 - April 20
- 2026 date: March 29 - April 5
- 2027 date: March 21 - March 28
- 2028 date: April 9 - April 16
- Frequency: Annual

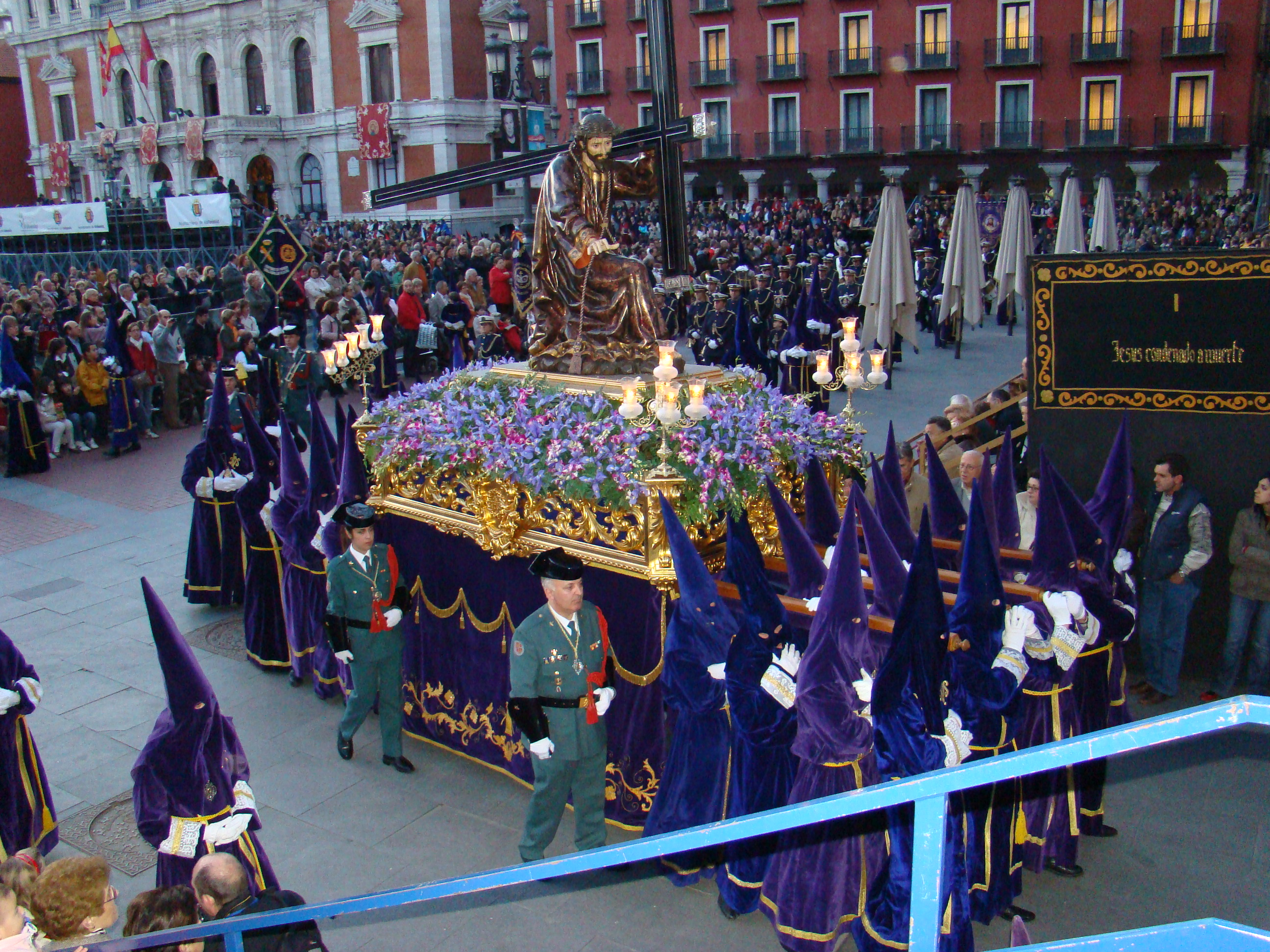
A Holy Week procession

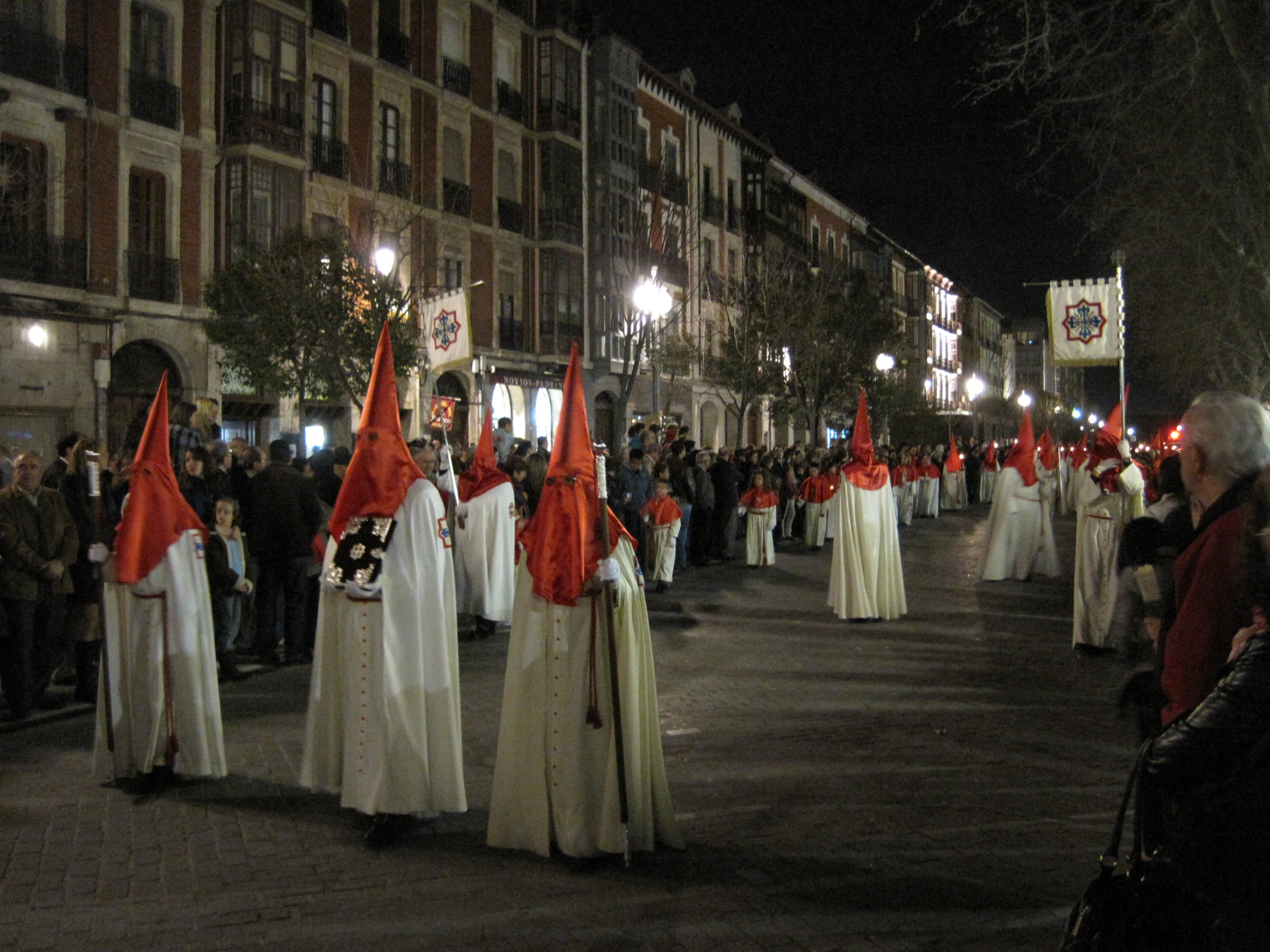
Holy Week procession in the city

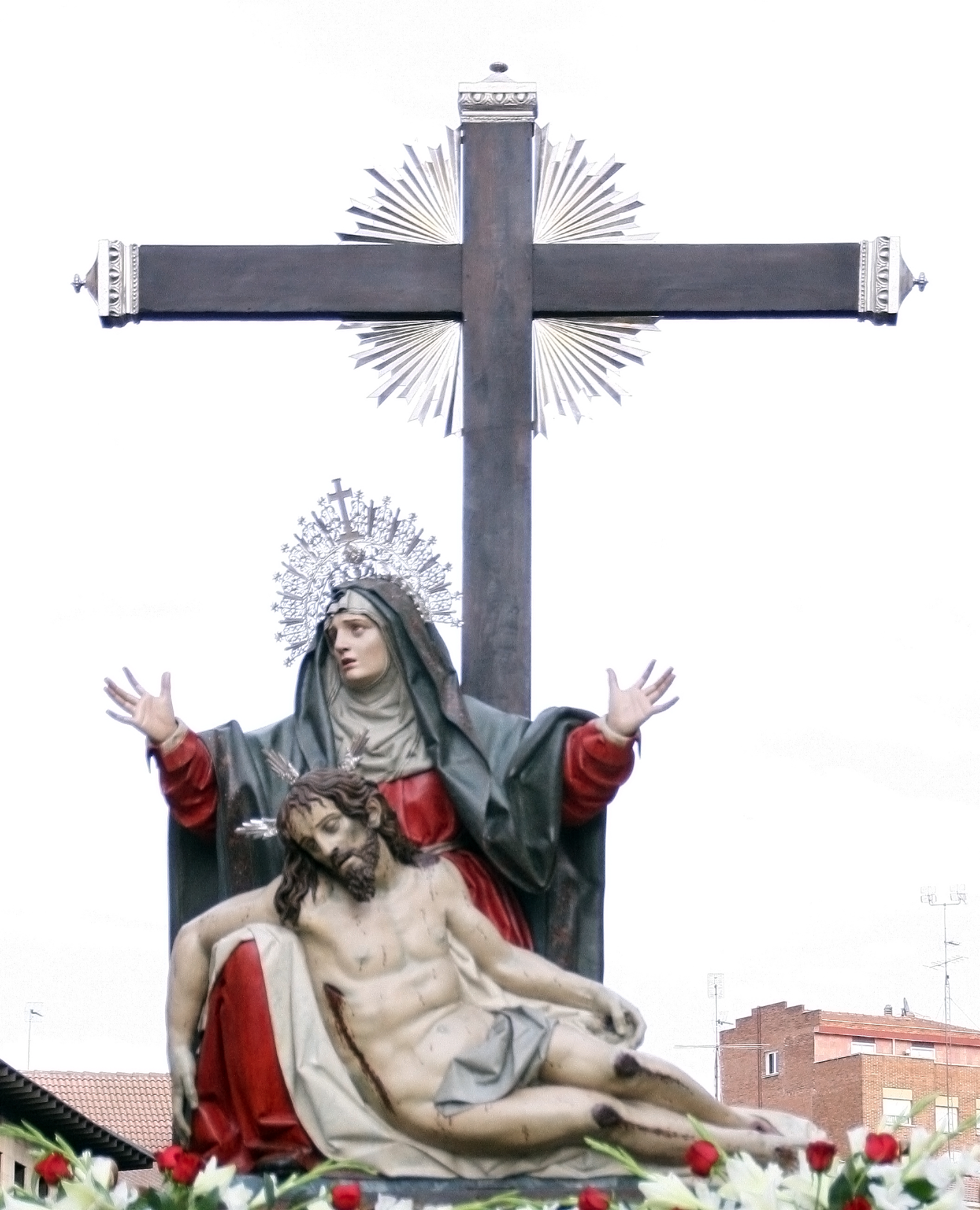
The Fifth Anxiety (La Quinta Angustia in Spanish), by Gregorio Fernández, Valladolid, 1625

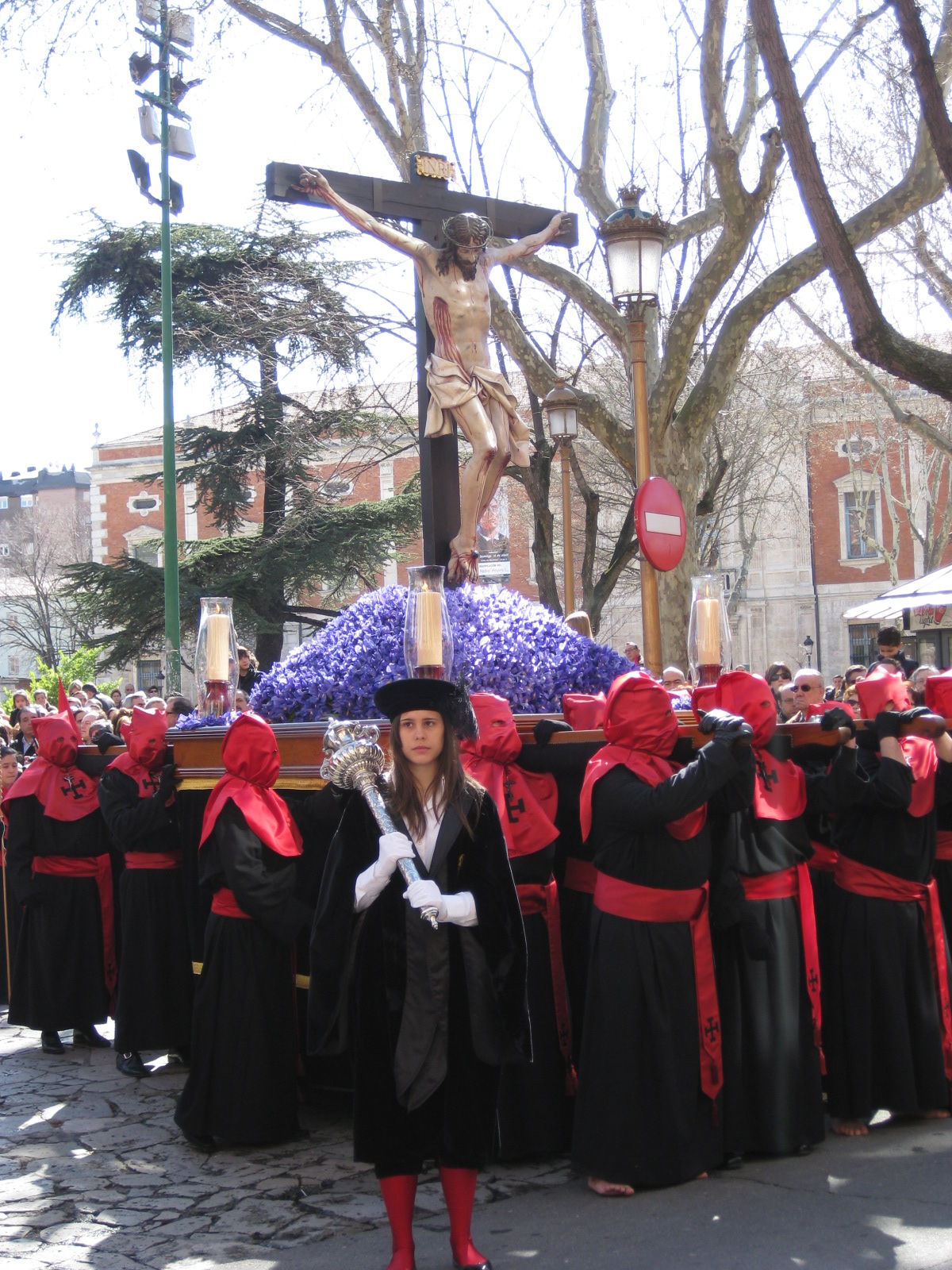
Brotherhoods

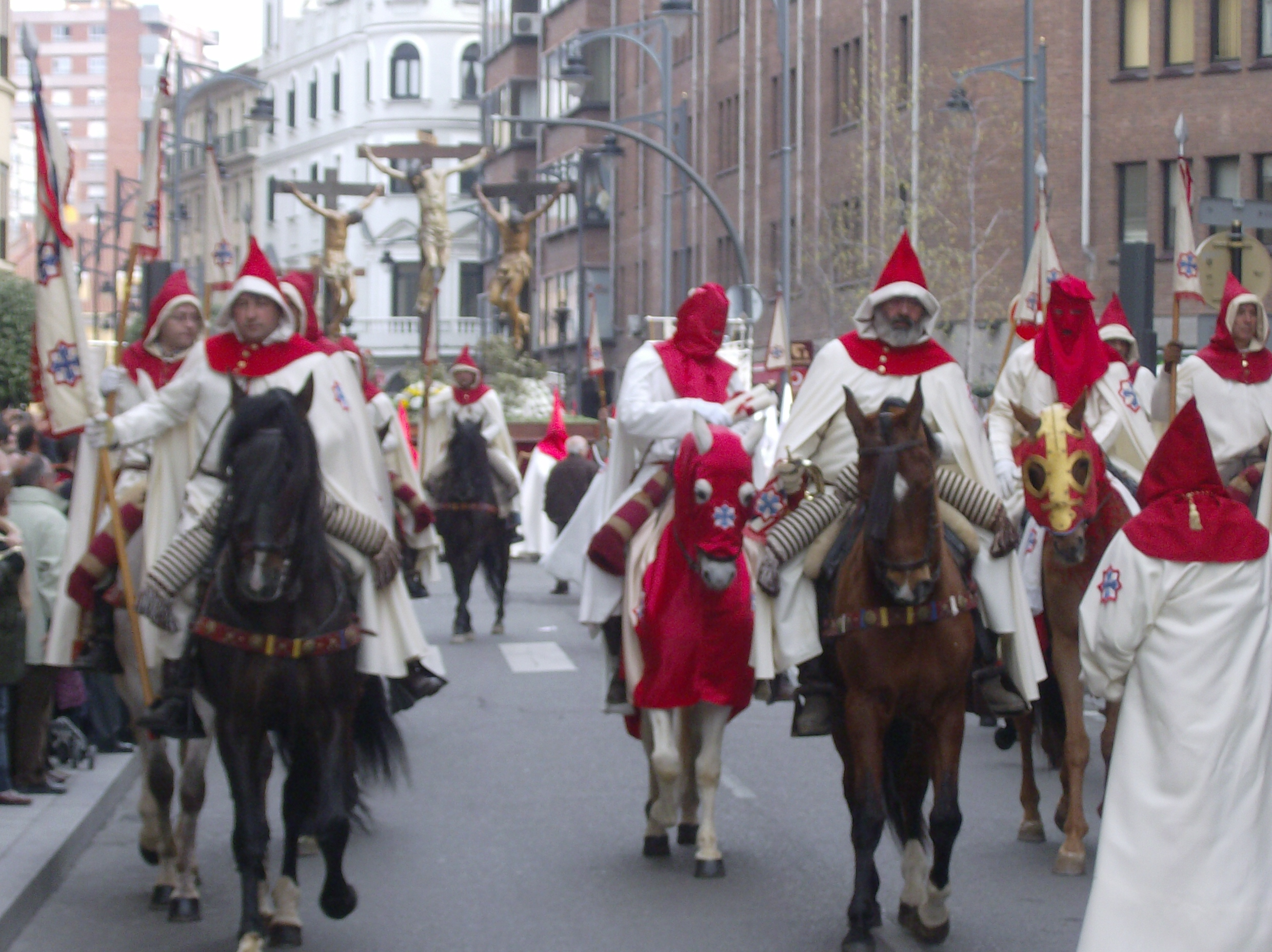
Parade horses during the proclamation

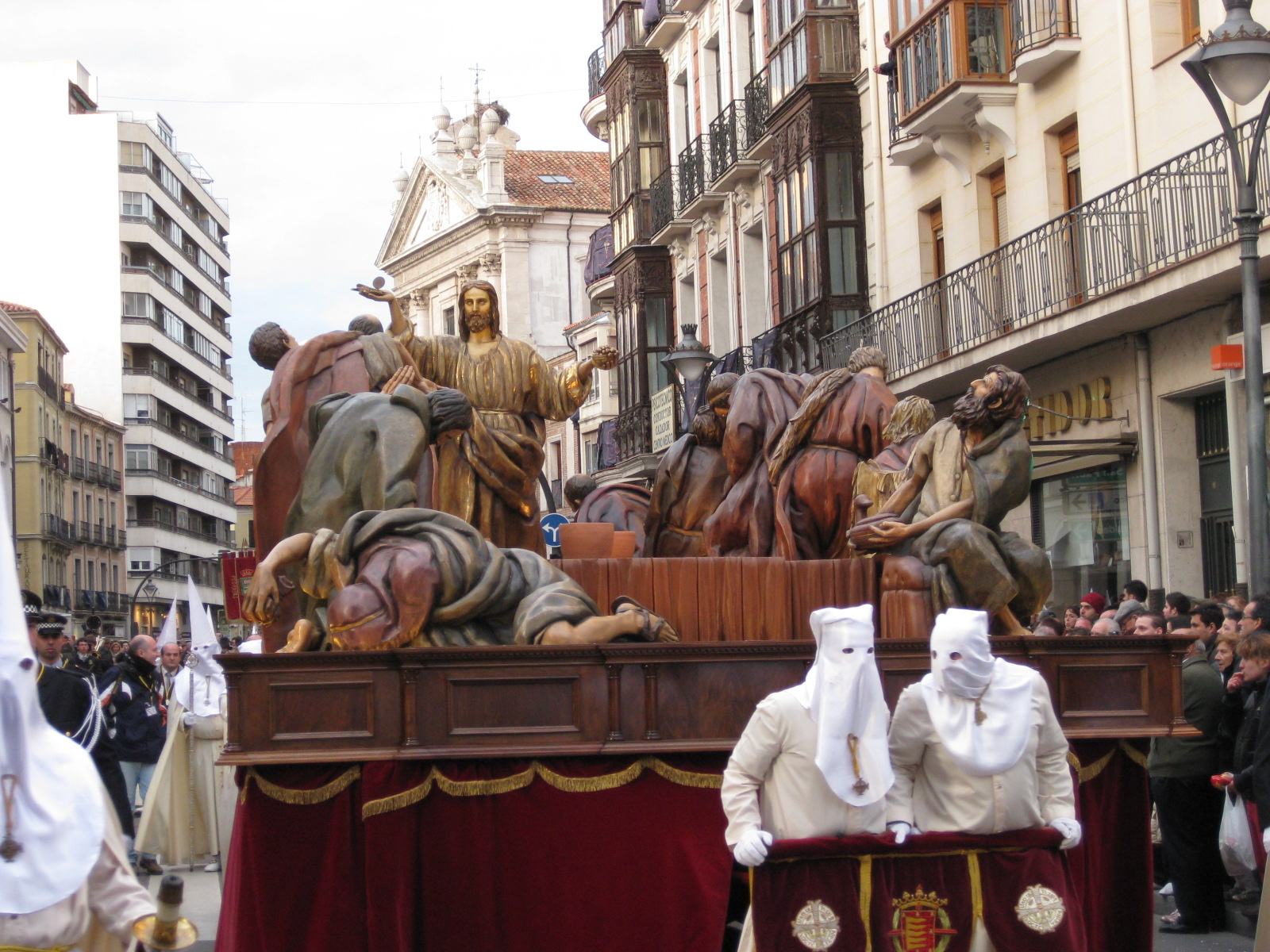
Paso on the streets.

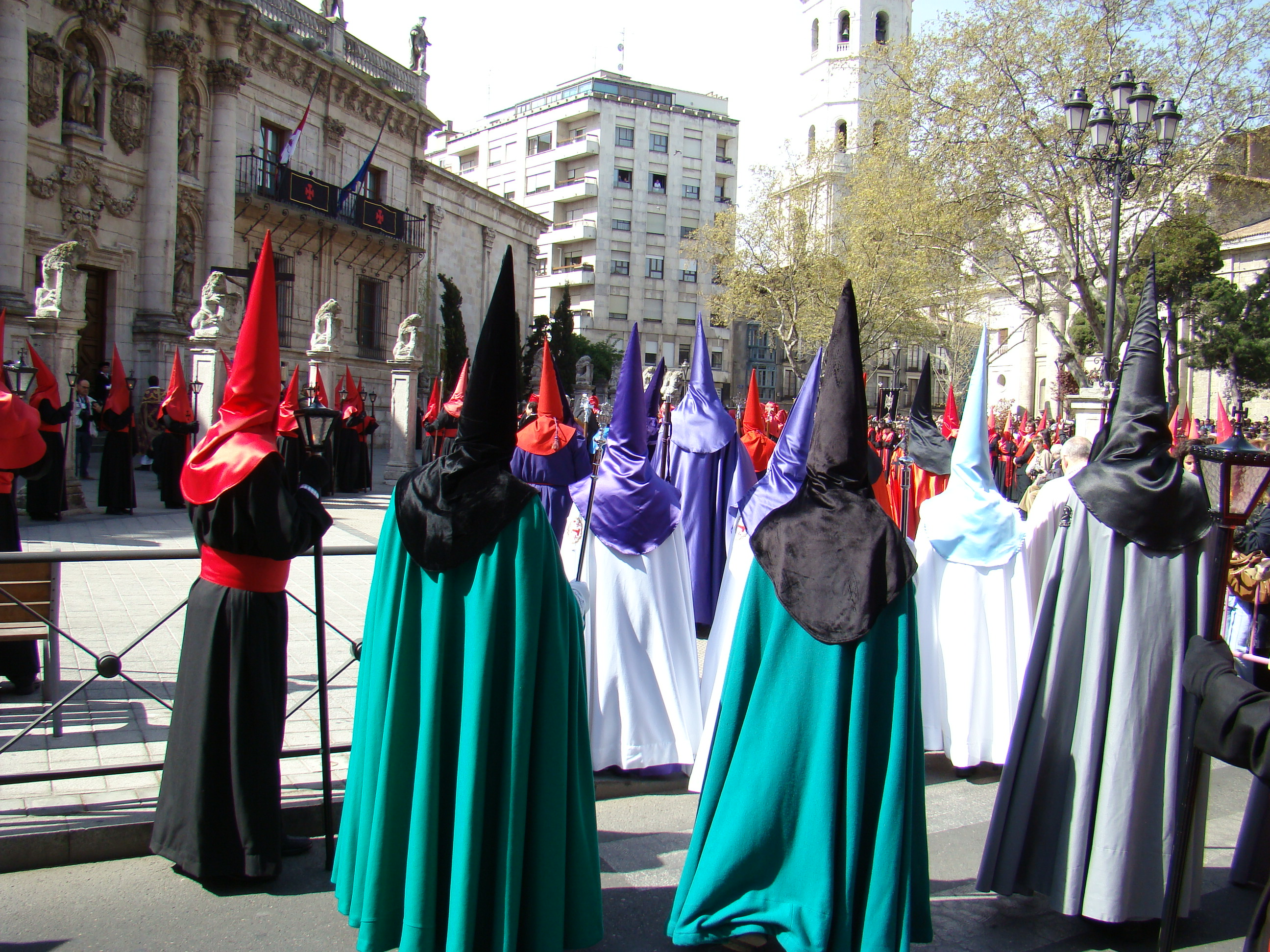
Members of different brotherhoods

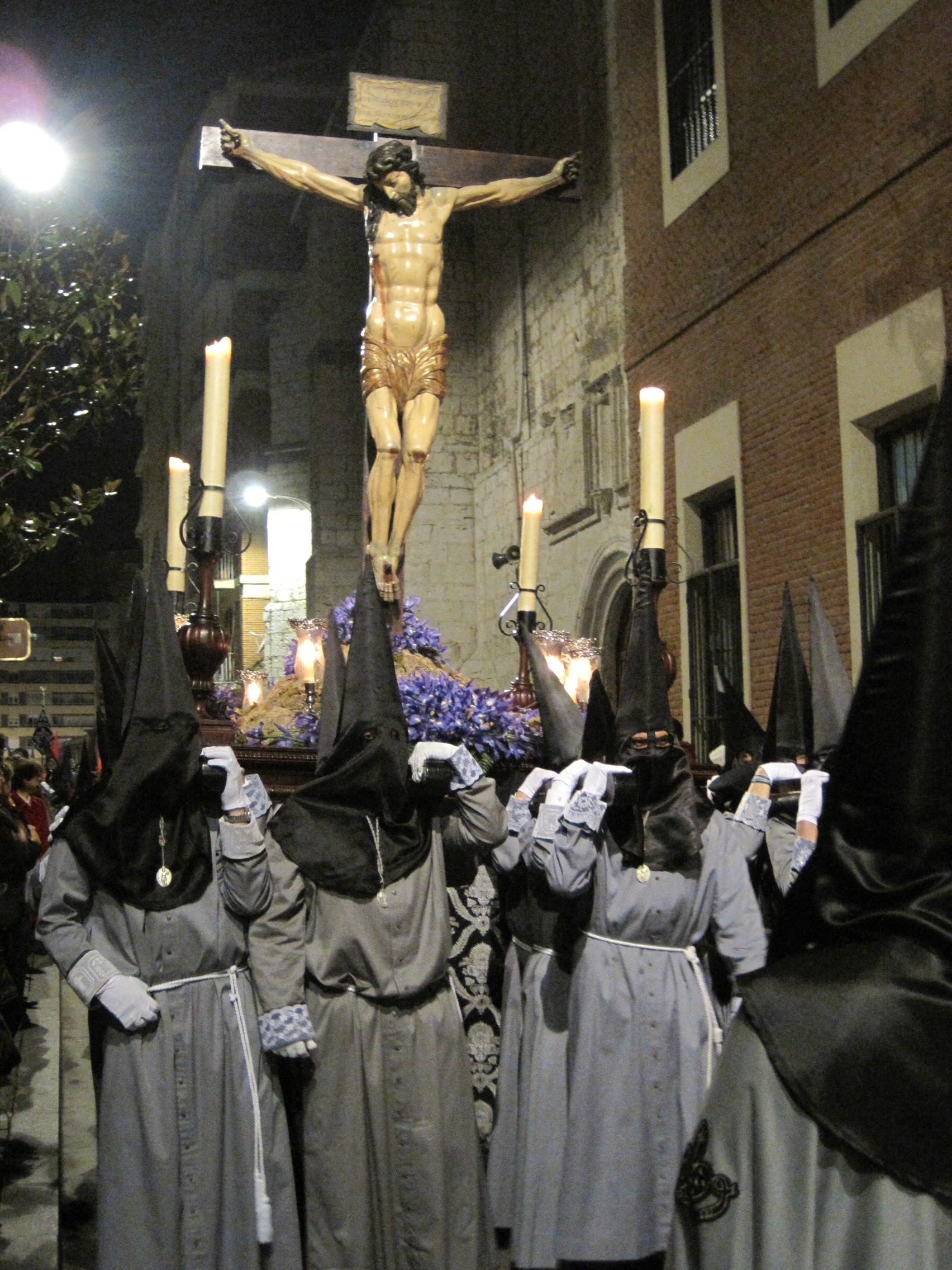
At night

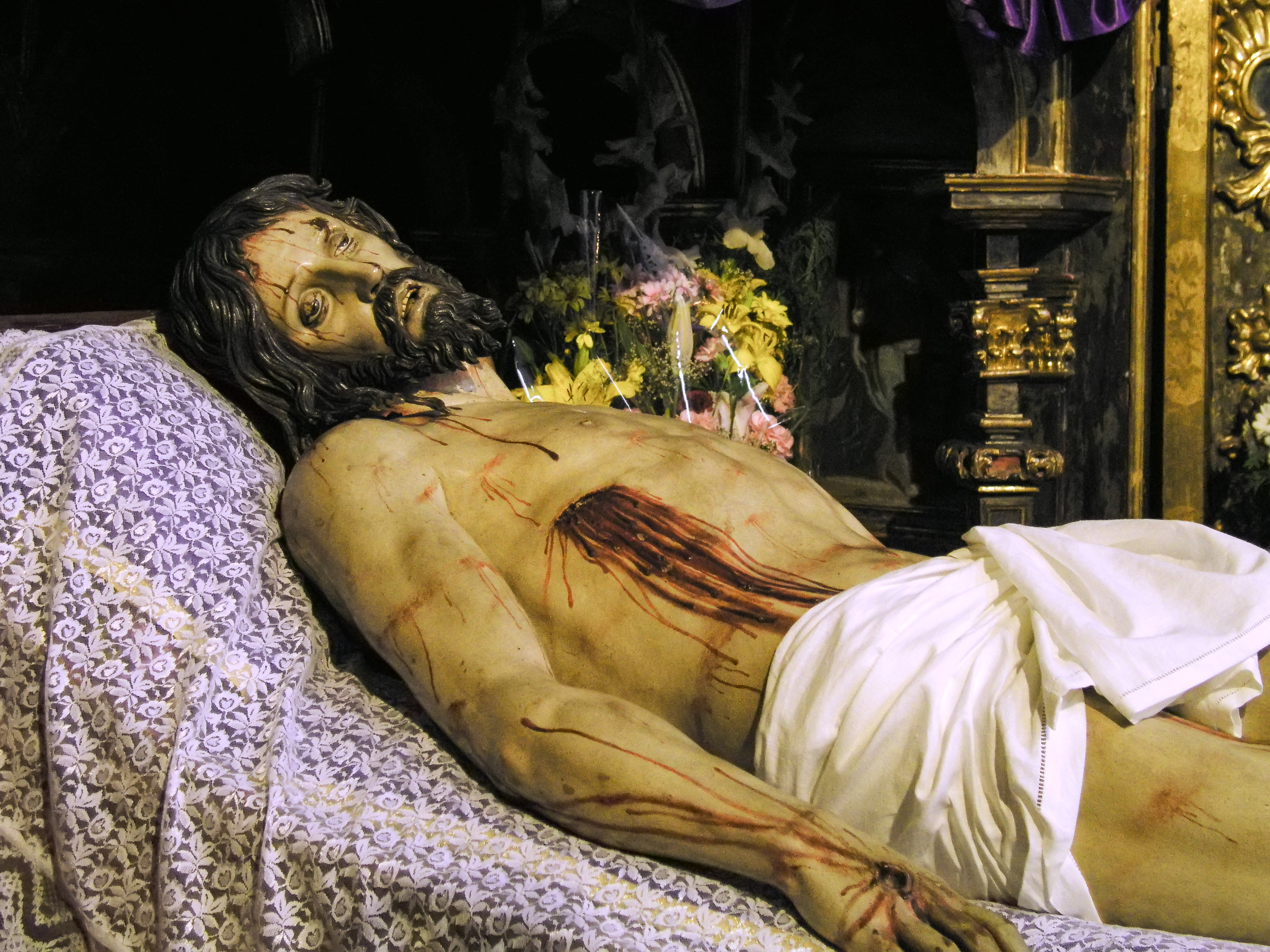
Lying Christ by Gregorio Fernández.

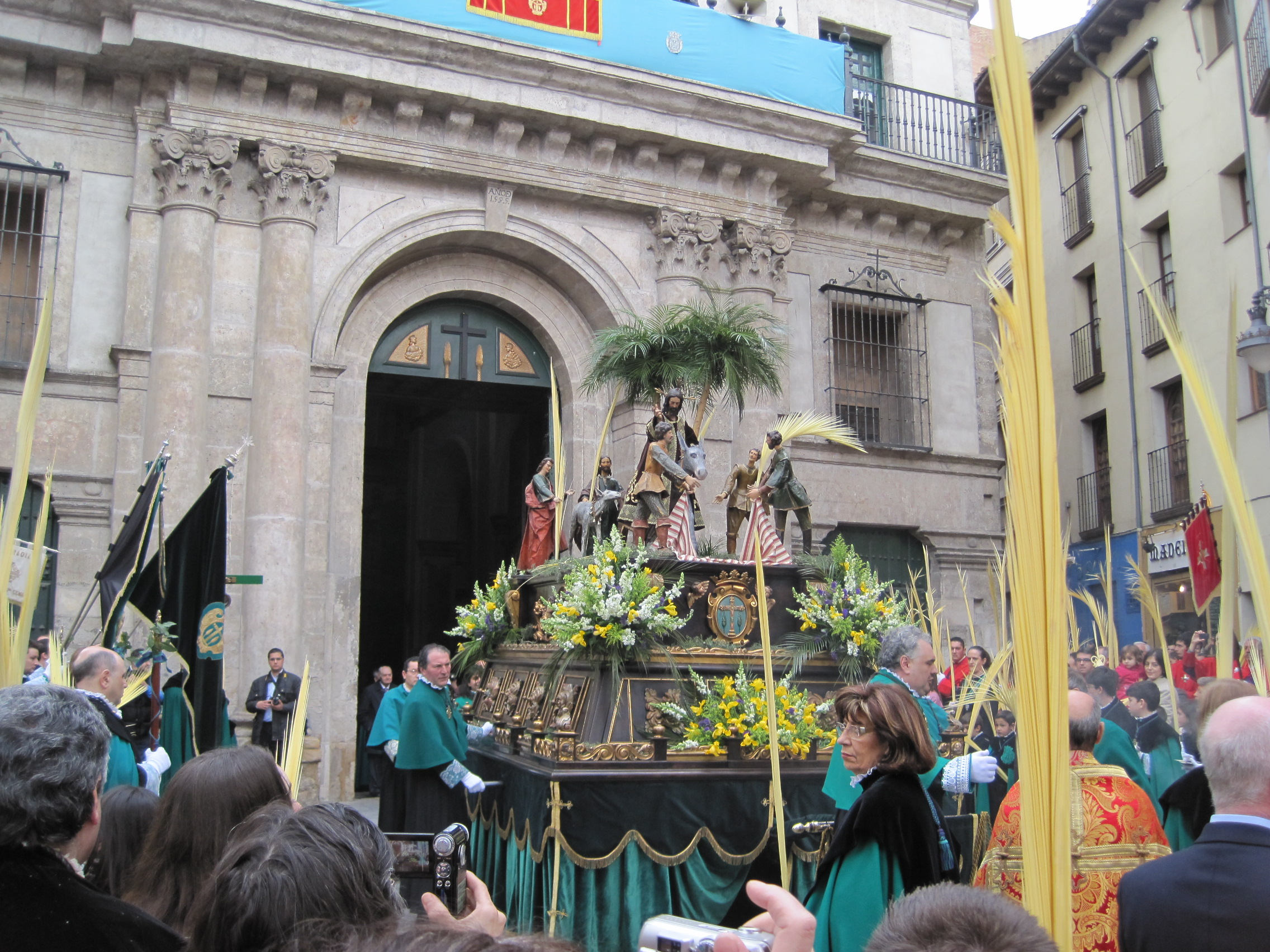
Jesus' triumphal entry into Jerusalem

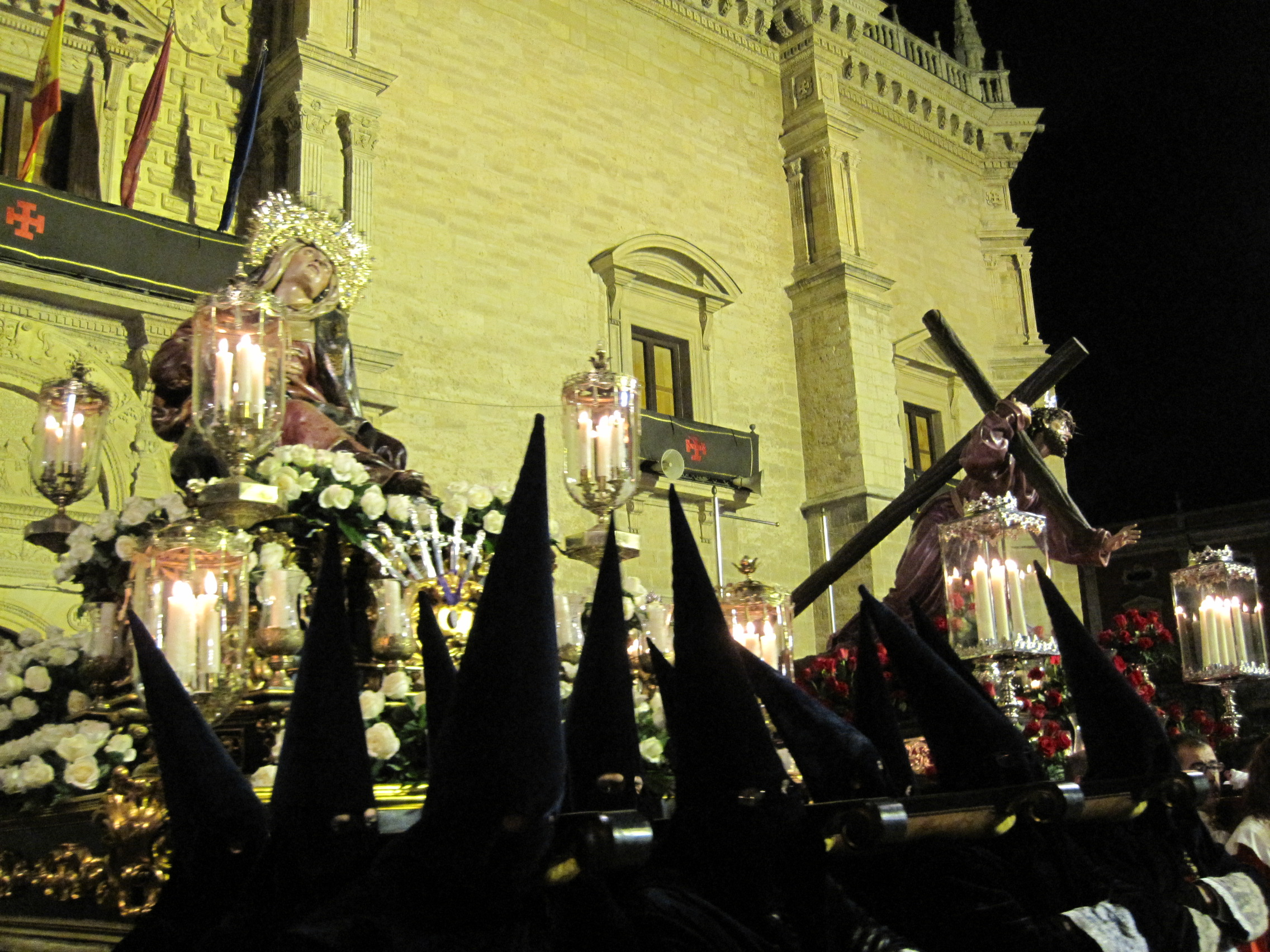
Meeting of the Virgin with her child in the street of the bitterness

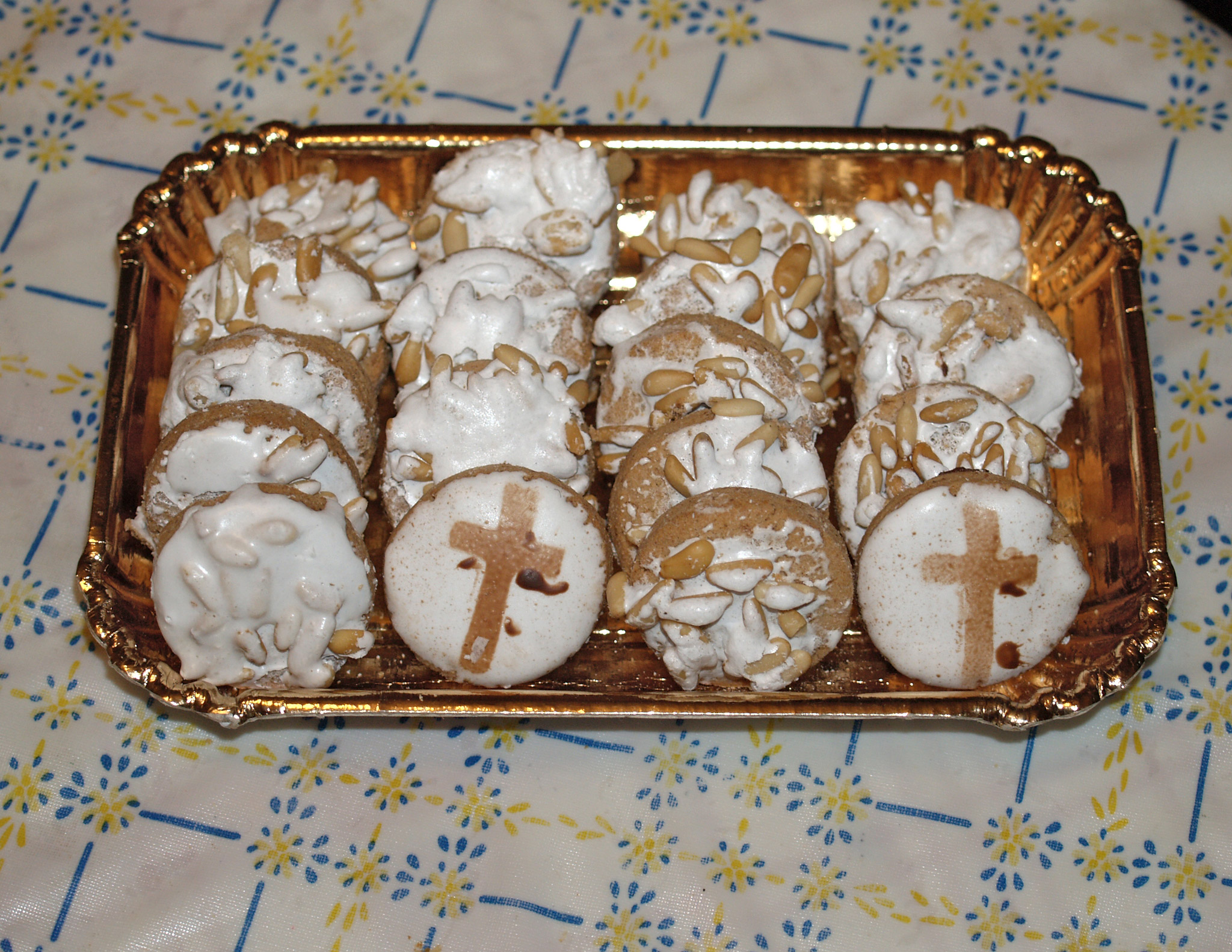
Pasta of the penitent, is one of the foods that is typical of the Gastronomy of Holy Week. This cuisine is mainly composed of sweets, pastas, pastries, cakes and other desserts (see also: Cuisine of the province of Valladolid).

The Holy Week in Valladolid is one of the main tourist attractions, and cultural and religious events of Valladolid and the surrounding province during Holy Week in Spain. It boasts of renowned polychrome sculptures, created mainly by sculptors such as Juan de Juni and Gregorio Fernández, who were active when the city served as the imperial court. The city's National Sculpture Museum has a total of 42 images (distributed in the corresponding pasos) for the processions. The Holy Week in Valladolid is known to depict the Passion with great fidelity, rigor and detail.

In addition to the artistic and catechetical (instructional) value of its religious imagery, the Week is characterized by devotion, sobriety, silence and respect for the brotherhoods and the public, and by unique acts such as the "General Procession of the Sacred Passion of the Redeemer" and "Sermon of the Seven Words" in the Plaza Mayor, which recalls the autos de fé (ritual of public penance) of the 16th century. For these reasons, this celebration was declared a Fiesta of International Tourist Interest in 1980 (the first Holy Week celebration in Spain to have such a designation), and in 2014 work began to have it recognized as a representation of intangible cultural heritage by UNESCO.

== Brotherhoods ==
The city's twenty brotherhoods (five were historical and the rest were created beginning in 1920) have a total of fifty-nine different pasos, which are described by the brotherhood that owns each of them, and hold a total of thirty-three floats (processions) as well as the "Proclamation" and the "Sermon of the Seven Words".

== Processions ==
The processions begin the Friday before Good Friday and continue until the Sunday of Resurrection. Hundreds of penitents or cofrades take part in the parades, carrying the pasos or walking the old streets of the city with crosses, flags or candles. Thousands of people, including locals and visitors attend the events. The silence is only interrupted by the sound of drums and trumpets. The pasos are the core of the festival. They consist of a wooden sculpture, or group of sculptures, that narrates a scene from the Passion of Christ. They are carried by porters, who are members of the brotherhoods, on a platform or staves. The processions are organized by hermandades and cofradías (religious brotherhoods). Members precede the pasos dressed in penitential robes with capirotes, (tall, pointed hoods with eye-holes). The capirotes were designed so the faithful could repent in anonymity, without being recognised as self-confessed sinners. Each brotherhood has its own distinct colors, reflected in its members' costumes, that distinguish them from other brotherhoods.

The Archbishopric of Valladolid, carefully following the liturgy, has been considering the day of the Holy Saturday as non-liturgical, and therefore, not suitable for holding processions. Based on this consideration, only a procession of Solitude is held in the morning, with absence of any adornment to the image of Nuestra Señora de las Angustias. The transfer of the Recumbent Christ is held in the afternoon and closes the Passion. Visitors are still waiting for the Resurrection. Special importance is then offer to the Blessed Virgin, a penitential act that is celebrated in the church of Vera Cruz.

== The Days of Holy Week ==
During the Friday and Saturday of Passion Week and into Holy Week itself, the following brotherhoods make their penitential processions in Valladolid, by the order of precedence of their entry into the main church and by the date of their founding.

=== Friday of Sorrows ===
- Cofradía del Santo Entierro (Brotherhood of the Holy Burial). 1930.
- Cofradía de la Exaltación de la Santa Cruz y Nuestra Señora de los Dolores (Brotherhood of the Exaltation of the Holy Cross and our Lady of Sorrows). 1944.

=== Passion Saturday ===
- Cofradía Penitencial de la Sagrada Pasión de Cristo (Penitential Procession of the Sacred Passion of Christ). 1531.

=== Palm Sunday ===
- Cofradía Penitencial de la Santa Vera Cruz (Penitential Confraternity of the Holy Vera Cruz). 1498.

=== Holy Monday ===
- Cofradía Penitencial de la Santa Vera Cruz (Penitential Confraternity of the Holy Vera Cruz). 1498.
- Venerable Cofradía de la Preciosísima Sangre de Nuestro Señor Jesucristo (Venerable Confraternity of the Precious Blood of our Lord Jesus Christ). 1929.
- Cofradía de las Siete Palabras (Brotherhood of the Seven Words). 1929.
- Hermandad Penitencial de Nuestro Padre Jesús atado a la Columna (Penitential Brotherhood of Our Father Jesus tied to the Column). 1930.
- Cofradía Penitencial de La Oración del Huerto y San Pascual Bailón (Brotherhood of the penitential prayer in Gethsemane and of Saint Pascual Bailon). 1939.
- Cofradía Penitencial del Santísimo Cristo Despojado, Cristo Camino del Calvario y Nuestra Señora de la Amargura. (Penitential Confraternity of the Blessed Christ stripped, Christ on the road to Calvary, and Our Lady of the Bitterness). 1943.
- Hermandad del Santo Cristo de los Artilleros (Brotherhood of the Holy Christ of the artillerymen). 1944.
- Cofradía del Discípulo Amado y Jesús de Medinaceli (Brotherhood of the Beloved Disciple and Jesus of Medinaceli). 2011. One of the newest to be formed, and the youngest brotherhood.

=== Holy Tuesday ===
- Ilustre Cofradía Penitencial de Nuestra Señora de las Angustias (Illustrious Penitential Brotherhood of Our Lady of Anguish). 1536.
- Hermandad Penitencial de Nuestro Padre Jesús atado a la Columna (Penitential Brotherhood of Our Father Jesus tied to the Column). 1930.
- Cofradía Penitencial del Santísimo Cristo Despojado, Cristo Camino del Calvario y Nuestra Señora de la Amargura. (Penitential Confraternity of the Blessed Christ stripped, Christ on the road to Calvary, and Our Lady of the Bitterness). 1943.

=== Holy Wednesday ===
- Cofradía de Nuestra Señora de la Piedad (Confraternity of Our Lady of Mercy). 1578.
- Cofradía Penitencial de Nuestro Padre Jesús Nazareno (Penitential Confraternity of Our Father Jesus of Nazareth). 1596.
- Cofradía de las Siete Palabras (Brotherhood of the Seven Words). 1929.
- Cofradía Penitencial y Sacramental de la Sagrada Cena (Sacramental and penitential Confraternity of the Holy Supper). 1940.
- Cofradía del Santo Sepulcro y Santísimo Cristo del Consuelo (''Brotherhood of the Holy Sepulchre and Great Holy Christ of the Comfort). 1945.
- Cofradía de Nuestro Padre Jesús Resucitado y María Santísima de la Alegría (Confraternity of Our Father The Risen Jesus and Holy Mary of Joy). 1960.

=== Holy Thursday ===
- Cofradía de la Orden Franciscana Seglar (V.O.T.) (Brotherhood of the Secular Franciscan Order (V. O. T. )). 15th century.
- Cofradía Penitencial de la Santa Vera Cruz (Penitential Confraternity of the Holy Vera Cruz). 1498.
- Cofradía Penitencial de la Sagrada Pasión de Cristo (Penitential Procession of the Sacred Passion of Christ). 1531.
- Cofradía de Nuestra Señora de la Piedad (Confraternity of Our Lady of Mercy). 1578.
- Cofradía Penitencial de Nuestro Padre Jesús Nazareno (Penitential Confraternity of Our Father Jesus of Nazareth). 1596.
- Venerable Cofradía de la Preciosísima Sangre de Nuestro Señor Jesucristo (Venerable Confraternity of the Precious Blood of our Lord Jesus Christ). 1929.
- Cofradía del Santo Entierro (Brotherhood of the Holy Burial). 1930.
- Cofradía Penitencial de La Oración del Huerto y San Pascual Bailón (Brotherhood of the penitential prayer in Gethsemane and Saint Pascual Bailon). 1939.
- Cofradía del Descendimiento y Santísimo Cristo de la Buena Muerte (Brotherhood of the descent and Holy Christ of the Good Death). 1939.
- Cofradía Penitencial y Sacramental de la Sagrada Cena (Sacramental and penitential Confraternity of the Holy Supper). 1940.
- Hermandad Universitaria del Santo Cristo de la Luz (University Brotherhood of Santo Cristo de la Luz). 1941.
- Cofradía Penitencial del Santísimo Cristo Despojado, Cristo Camino del Calvario y Nuestra Señora de la Amargura. (Penitential Confraternity of the Blessed Christ stripped, Christ on the road to Calvary, and Our Lady of the Bitterness). 1943.
- Cofradía de la Exaltación de la Santa Cruz y Nuestra Señora de los Dolores (Brotherhood of the Exaltation of the Holy Cross and our Lady of Sorrows). 1944.
- Cofradía de Nuestro Padre Jesús Resucitado y María Santísima de la Alegría (Confraternity of Our Father The Risen Jesus and Holy Mary of Joy). 1960.

=== Good Friday ===
- Cofradía de la Orden Franciscana Seglar (V.O.T.) (Brotherhood of the Secular Franciscan Order (V. O. T. )). 15th century.
- Ilustre Cofradía Penitencial de Nuestra Señora de las Angustias (''Illustrious Penitential Brotherhood of Our Lady of Anguish). 1536.
- Cofradía de las Siete Palabras (Brotherhood of the Seven Words). 1929.
- Hermandad Universitaria del Santo Cristo de la Luz (University Brotherhood of Santo Cristo de la Luz). 1941.

=== Good Friday (General Procession) ===
- All the brotherhoods

=== Holy Saturday ===
- Cofradía del Santo Entierro (Brotherhood of the Holy Burial). 1930.
- Cofradía de Nuestro Padre Jesús Resucitado y María Santísima de la Alegría (Confraternity of Our Father The Risen Jesus and Holy Mary of Joy). 1960.

=== Easter Sunday ===
- Ilustre Cofradía Penitencial de Nuestra Señora de las Angustias (Illustrious Penitential Brotherhood of Our Lady of Anguish). 1536.
- Cofradía del Santo Sepulcro y Santísimo Cristo del Consuelo (Brotherhood of the Holy Sepulchre and Great Sant Christ of Comfort). 1945.

== See also ==
- Holy Week
- Holy Week in Spain
- Fiestas of International Tourist Interest of Spain

== Bibliography ==
- Burrieza Sánchez, Javier (2004). Cinco Siglos de Cofradías y Procesiones. Junta de Cofradías de Semana Santa de Valladolid. Depósito Legal VA. 201-2004.
- Varios autores (2005). Memorias de la Pasión en Valladolid. Junta de Cofradías de Semana Santa. Depósito Legal VA. 174-2005.
- Burrieza Sánchez, Javier (2005). Guía Histórico Artística de la Procesión General. Junta de Cofradías de Semana Santa. Depósito Legal VA. 809-2005.
- Burrieza Sánchez, Javier (2010). Historia de una Procesión: 200 años de la General del Viernes Santo de Valladolid. Ayuntamiento de Valladolid y Junta de Cofradías de Semana Santa. Depósito Legal VA. 229-2010
