= Pietà (Gregorio Fernández) =

Sculpture by Gregorio Fernández

Pietà - Sexta Angustia
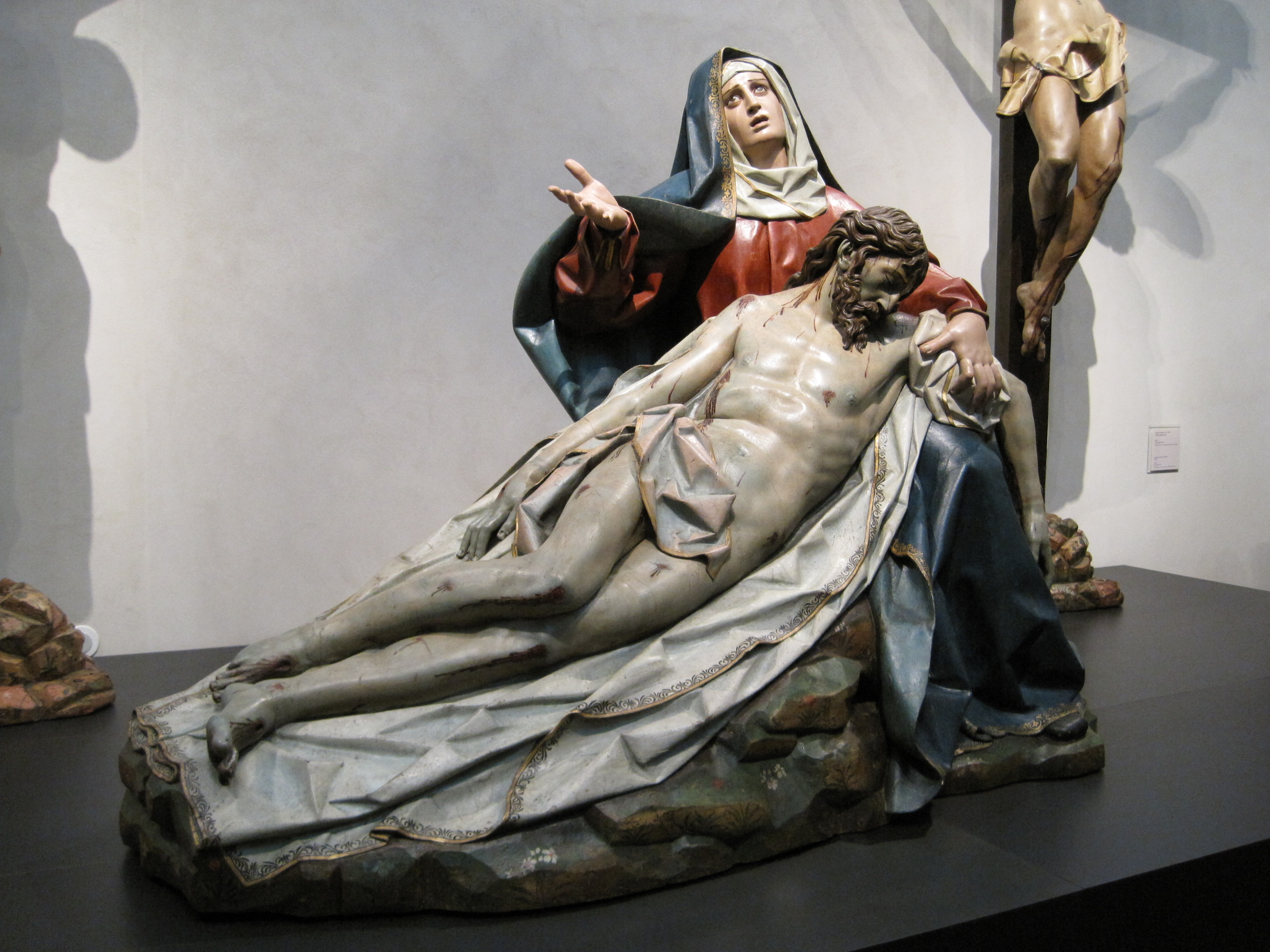
- Artist: Gregorio Fernández
- Year: 1616–1619
- Type: Sculpture
- Medium: Polichrome wood
- Dimensions: 175 cm × 218 cm × 140 cm (69 in × 86 in × 55 in)
- Location: National Sculpture Museum, Valladolid

The Pietà or Sexta Angustia (1616–1619) is a work of Baroque sculpture by Gregorio Fernández, housed in the National Museum of Sculpture in Valladolid, Spain. The statue was commissioned by the Illustrious Penitential Brotherhood of Our Lady of Anguish. It is one of the best known of the five sculptures of the same theme by the artist.

The sculpture shows the Virgin Mary holding up one hand with Christ's body slumped lifeless to the floor, by her feet. It was part of a "paso" which paraded in religious processions during Holly Week, together with the sculptures of the good thief and the impenitent thief, and Saint John and the Virgin Mary.

== The other Pietà ==
- Pietà (1610–1612). Church of Our Lady of the Mount Carmel (Spanish: Iglesia de Nuestra Señora del Carmen), Burgos. Attribution.
- Pietà (ca. 1620) from St. Clare's Monastery in Carrión de los Condes.
- Quinta Angustia (ca.1625-1627), housed in the church of Saint Martín in Valladolid.
- Pietà (ca. 1628) from the church of Saint Mary in La Bañeza.
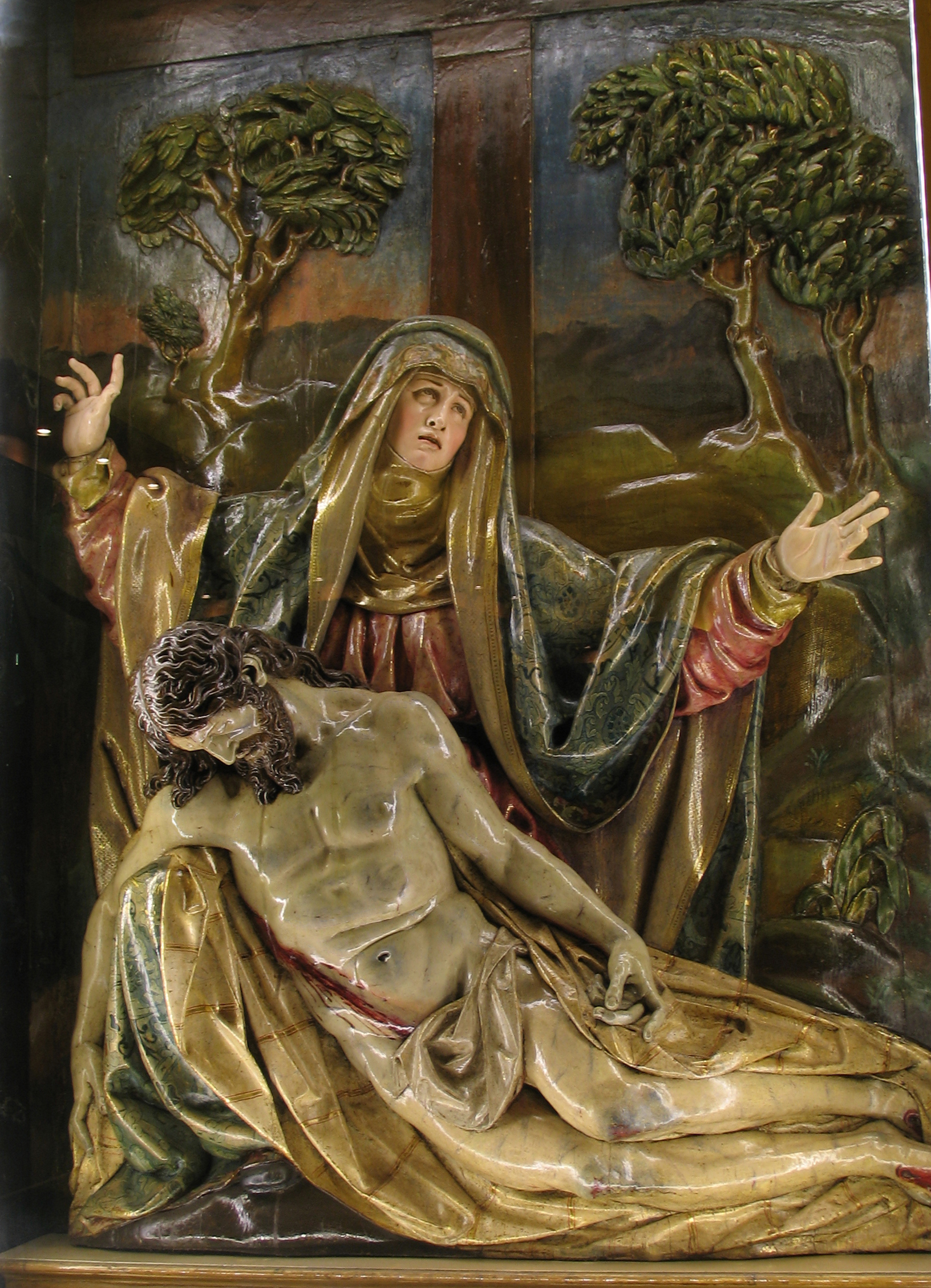
Pietà. Burgos

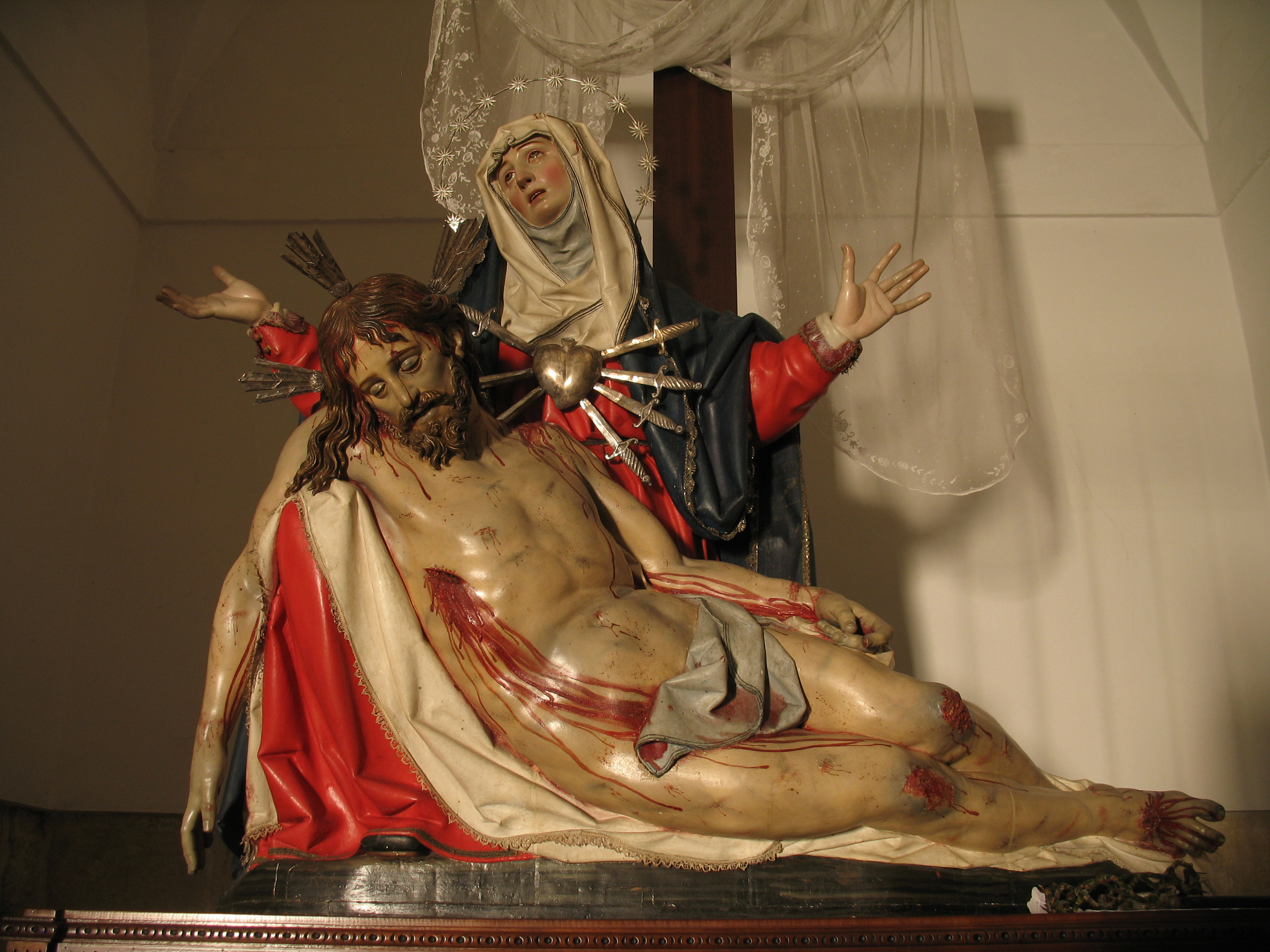
Pietà. Monasterio de Santa Clara

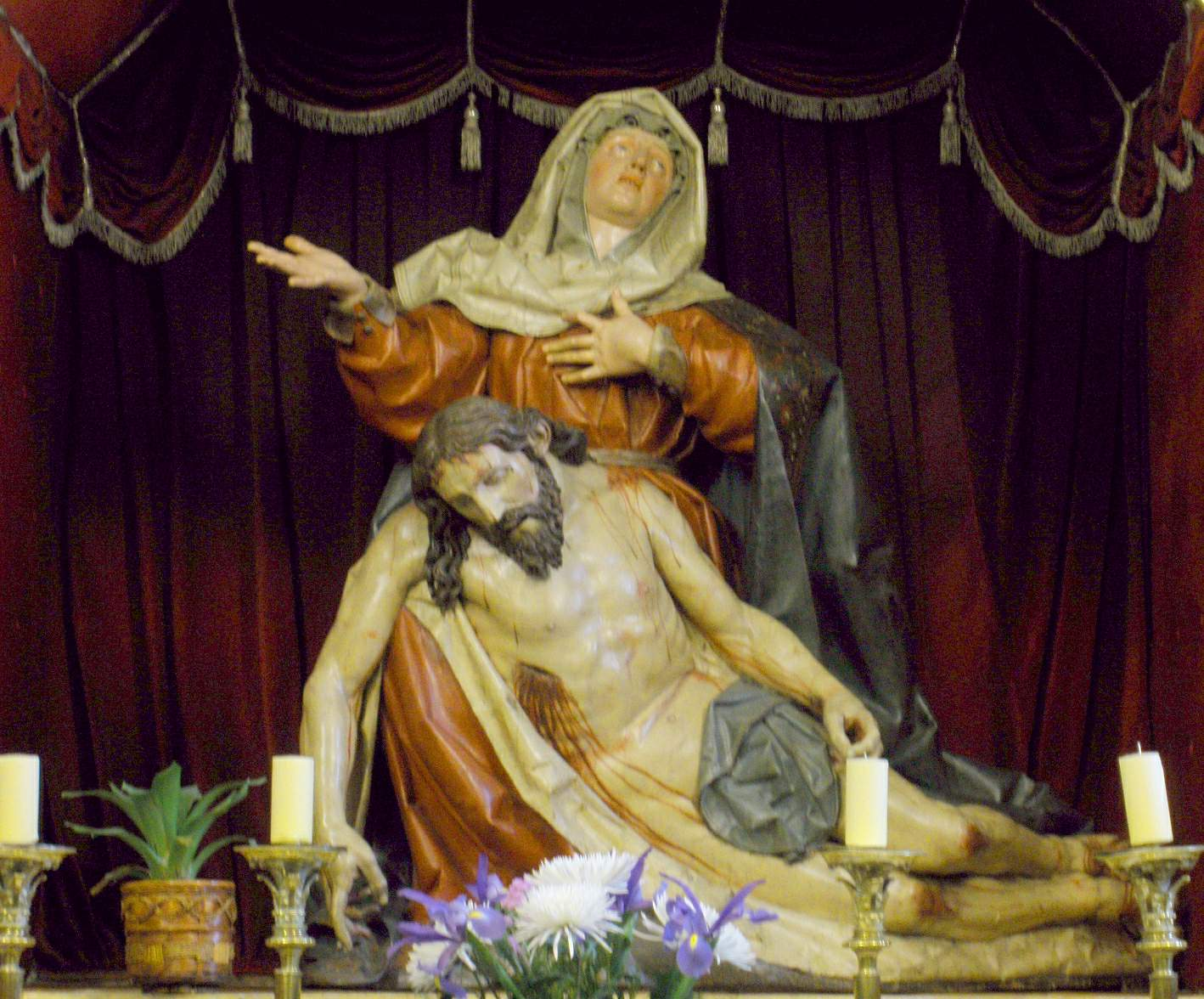
Pietà. La Bañeza

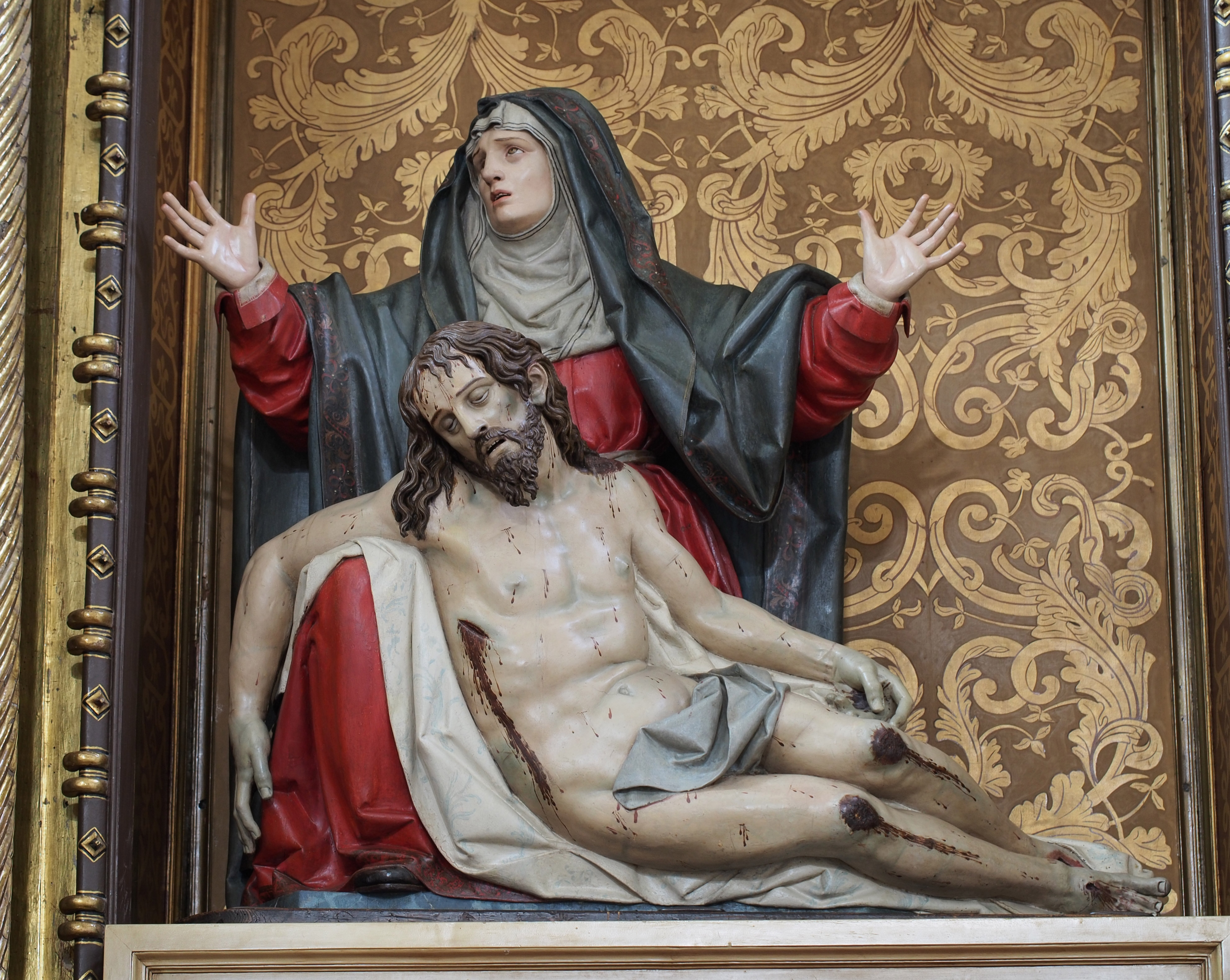
Quinta Angustia. Valladolid

== Precedent ==
There was a tradition of sculptured Pietàs in Castilian art by artists such Juan de Juni or Francisco del Rincón.

== See also ==
- List of statues of Jesus
