= Cristo Yacente of El Pardo =

Image of the dead Christ

Coordinates: 40°31′8.53″N 3°47′19.86″W

Cristo yacente (Dead Christ) of El Pardo
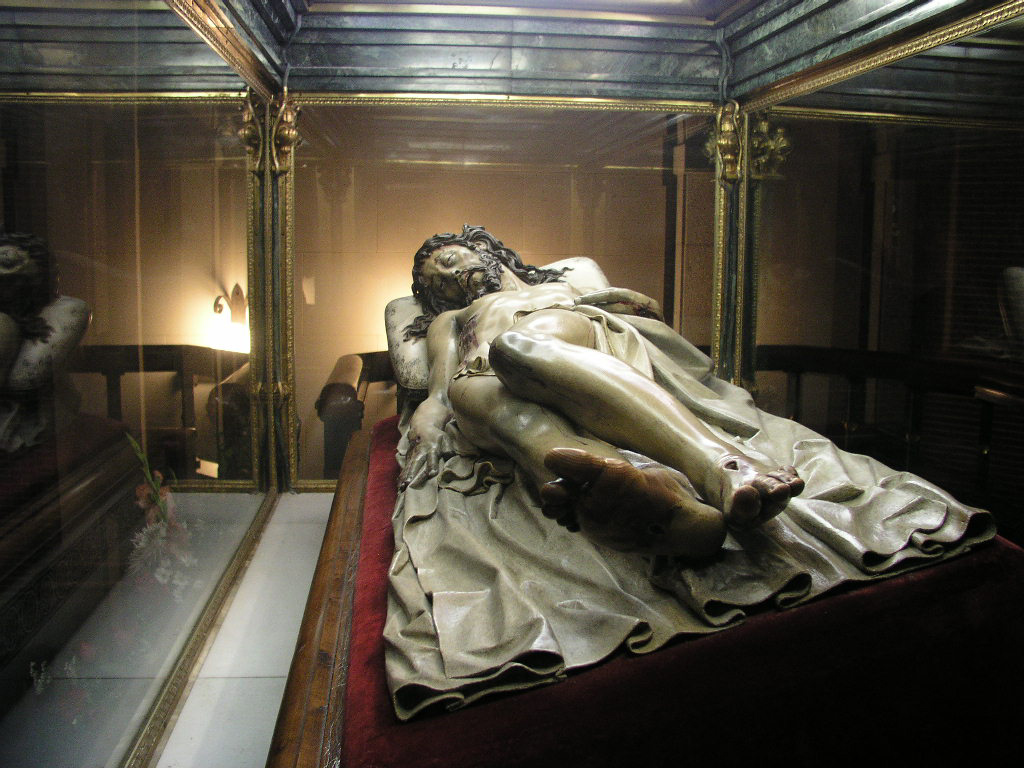
- Artist: Gregorio Fernández
- Year: 1614
- Type: Sculpture
- Medium: Polichrome wood
- Dimensions: 155 cm (61 in)
- Location: Capuchin Monastery; El Pardo, (Madrid)

The Cristo Yacente (Dead Christ) of El Pardo, is a life-size polychromed sculpture by Spanish sculptor Gregorio Fernández, executed between 1614 and 1615. Housed in a chapel of the Capuchin Monastery of El Pardo (Madrid), the sculpture was commissioned by King Philip III to celebrate the birth of his son Philip IV.

The Cristo yacente of El Pardo is the most famous of the fourteen "Cristos" produced by Fernández and his workshop.

As devotional images, many of them were processed during Holy Week with other “pasos” (elaborate religious floats adorned with sculptures depicting scenes from the Passion of Christ). All these images were created in accordance with Counter-Reformation ideology that required realism in religious images to impress and move the believer.

== Sources ==
- Colón Mendoza, Ilenia (2008). The Cristos yacentes of Gregorio Fernández: Polychrome sculptures of the supine Christ in seventeenth-century Spain. The Pennsylvania State University.
- Colón Mendoza, Ilenia. The Cristos yacentes of Gregorio Fernández: Polychrome Sculptures of the Supine Christ in Seventeenth-Century Spain. England: Routledge Publishing, 2015.
