= Christ at the Column (Gregorio Fernández) =

Sculpture by Gregorio Fernández

Coordinates: 41°39′13.6″N 4°43′35″W

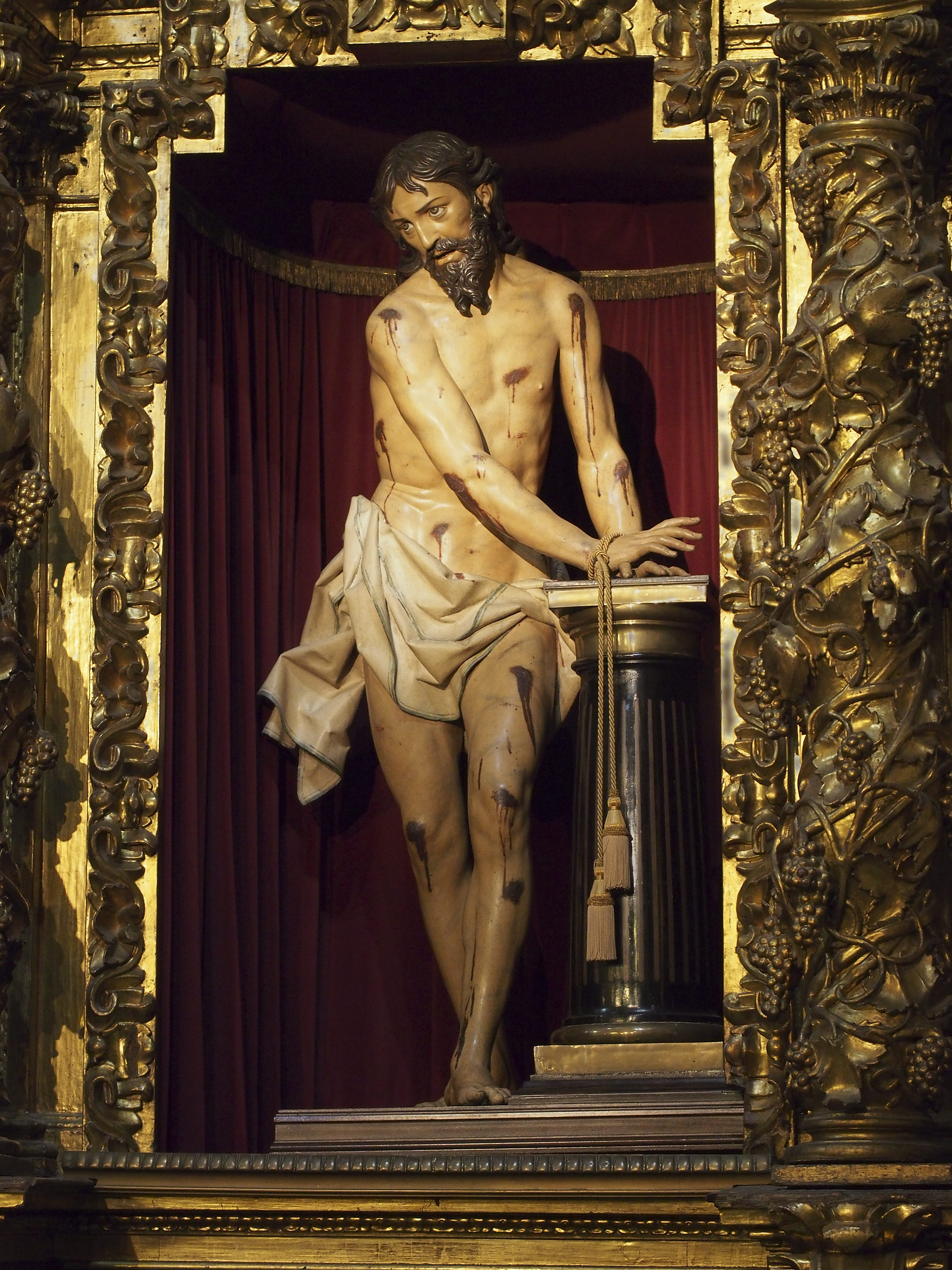
- Artist: George Fernández
- Year: 1619
- Type: Sculpture
- Medium: Polichrome wood
- Dimensions: Life-size
- Location: Church of the True Cross; Valladolid

Christ at the Column is a life-size sculpture by the Spanish artist Gregorio Fernández.

Gregorio Fernández was commissioned by the Illustrious Penitential Brotherhood of the Holy Cross, to undertake a “paso”, a group of wooden statues, depicting the flagellation of Christ. The sculpture of the Christ started as a figure for this composition and was in the mid 17th century when the sculpture was presented as a separate and independent work. The sculpture is characterized by combining classical form and naturalism with the intensity of religious emotion.

== Similar works ==
Fernández and his workshop executed a number of versions of this subject.

- Ávila. St. Teresa's convent (ca. 1632)
- Valladolid, St. Teresa's convent
- Madrid, Royal Convent of the Incarnation (ca.1625)
- Madrid. Foundation Banco Santander (ca.1616)
- Calahorra. St Joseph's Convent
