= Illustrious Penitential Brotherhood of Our Lady of Anguish =

Coordinates: 41.6539°N 4.7241°W

The Illustrious Penitential Brotherhood of Our Lady of Anguish (Spanish: Ilustre Cofradía Penitencial de Nuestra Señora de las Angustias) is a Catholic fraternity established in Valladolid, Castile and León, Spain in 1536.

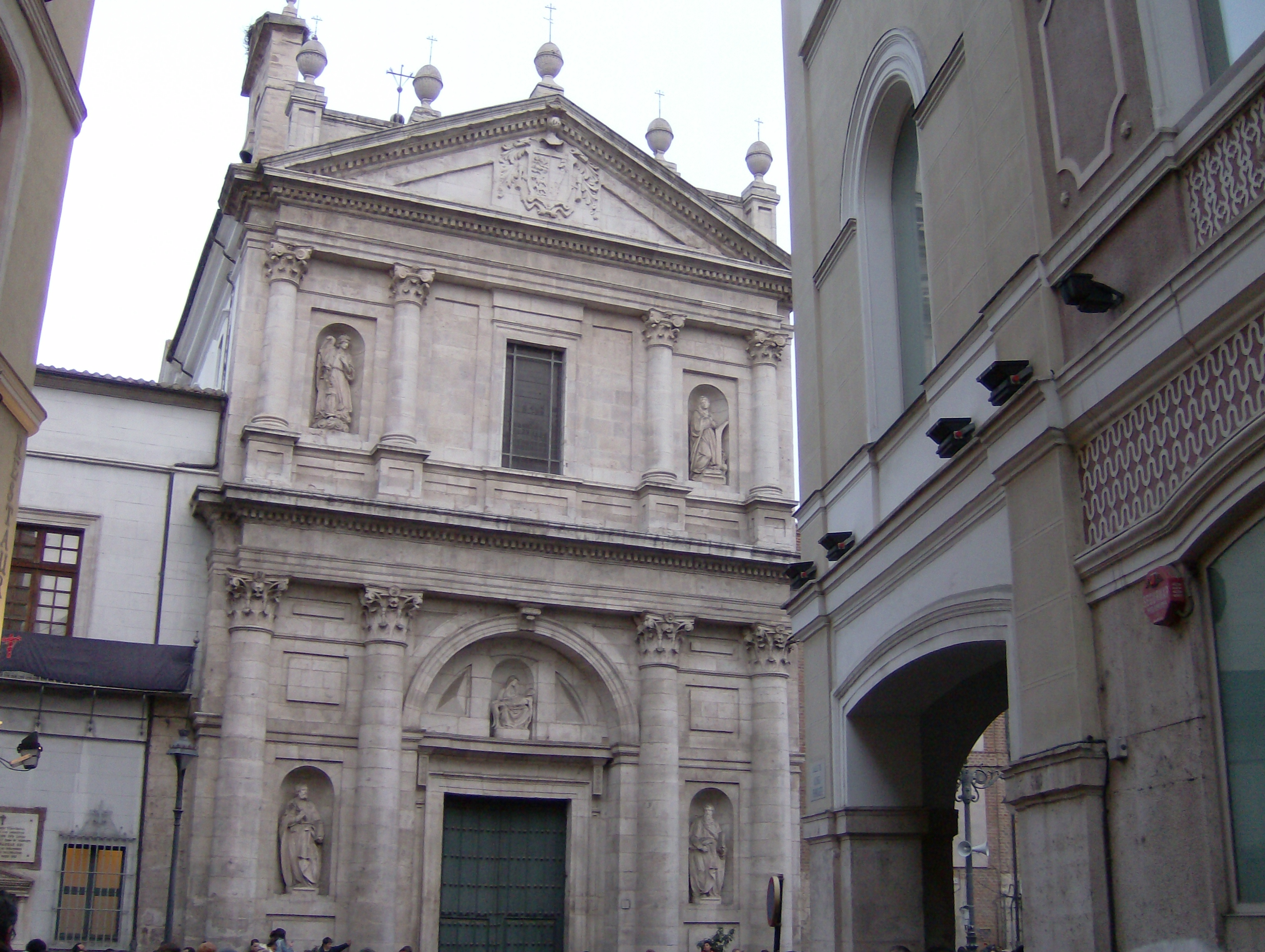
The Church of Our Lady of Anguish

== Mission ==
The brotherhood of the Virgin of Anguish has the mission of promoting the devotion to the Blessed Virgin Mary, mainly through the celebration of several Holy Week processions in the city. The members of the brotherhood celebrate several masses as well, following the Estatutos o constitutions of the own association and the liturgic calendar of the Roman Catholic Church. Any baptized Catholic individual can become a member; however, family tradition is very important to belong to the Anguish.

== History ==
The earliest document preserved that proves the antiquity of the Brotherhood dates from 1569. In this document there are references to a papal bull from Pope Paulus III given in 1536. Historically, the brotherhood has claimed older origins, linked with queen Isabella I of Castile, without documental prove.

The image of the Virgin of the Anguish by artist Juan de Juni was carved in 1561 and became the main piece of devotion of the brothers and eventually of the entire city.

The brotherhood first built a chapel in the location of actual Torrecilla street. By 1613 the brothers decided to build a new church since the original chapel was almost ruined. Since its construction to the present day, the Church of the Anguish has been the headquarters of the brotherhood. During the 16th and 17th centuries, the Anguish run a hospital according to its foundational mission: assist the needy.

In the 17th century Valladolid experienced a brilliant artistic period. The Catholic church and the Penitent brotherhoods commissioned important art works for the churches and penance processions. The Anguish Brotherhood commissioned pasos to artist such as Francisco del Rincón and Gregorio Fernández.

The 19th century was a period of decadence in the celebration of Holy Week in Valladolid. Many pasos were abandoned and the parades lost its former splendour. The Anguish brotherhood experience the same process but the devotion for the image of Mary remained as an important local devotion.

Archbishop Remigio Gandaségui restored the processions in Valladolid in 1920 collaboration with the National Museum of Sculpture where most of the pasos had been preserved.

The 3 October 2009, the image of the virgin of Anguish was canonically crowned by archbishop Braulio Plaza

== Pasos ==
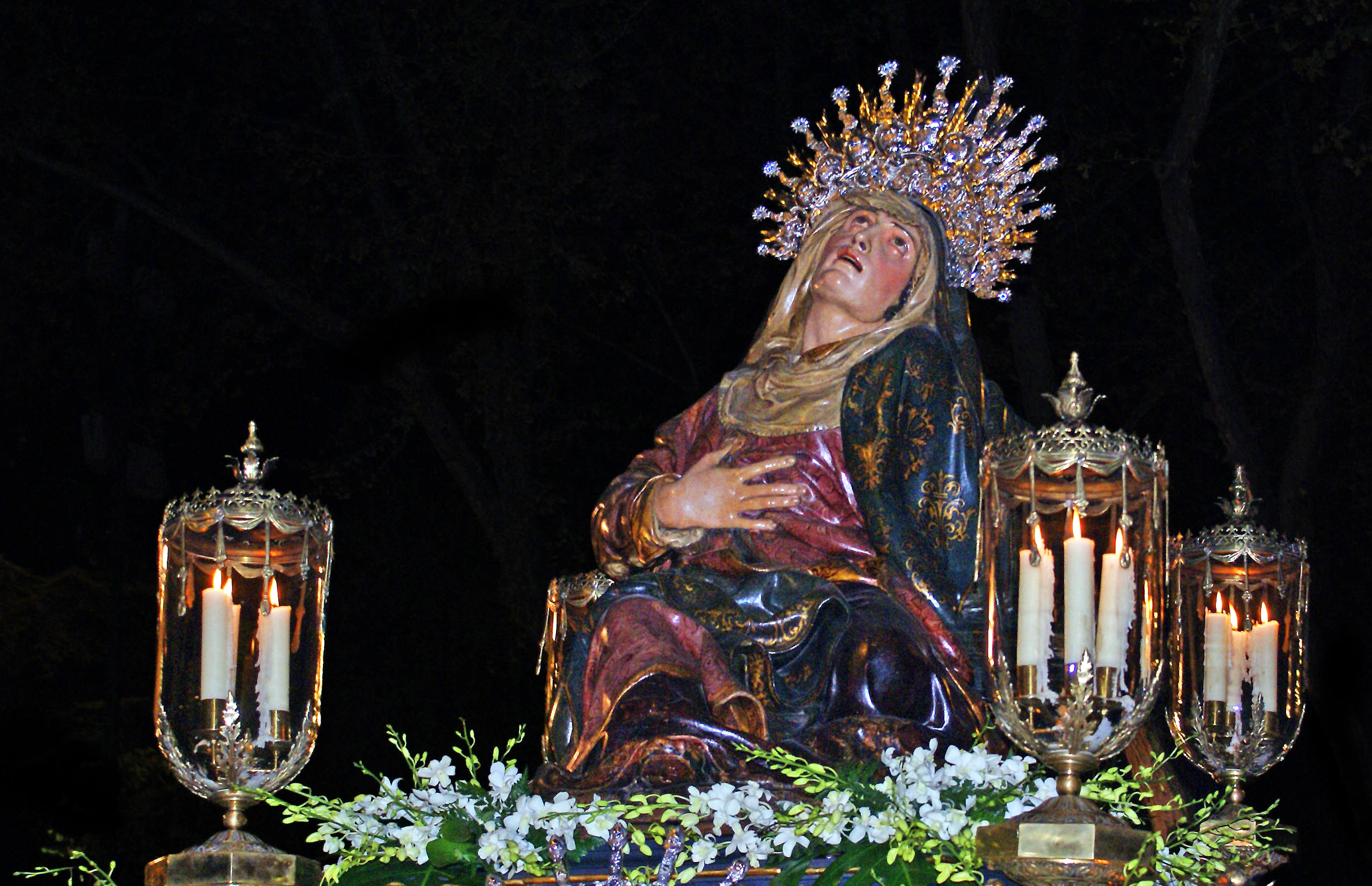
The image of Our Lady of Anguish in its float

- Virgin of Anguish, Juan de Juni, 1561
- Crucified Jesús, Francisco del Rincón, before 1618. Known as "Cristo de los Carboneros"
- The Descent from the Cross, Gregorio Fernández, 1615 - 1617
- Laying Jesús, anon. 17th century
- Holy Sepulchre, Gregorio Fernández and José de Rozas
- Virgin of Encarnation, anon. 16th century

== Processions ==
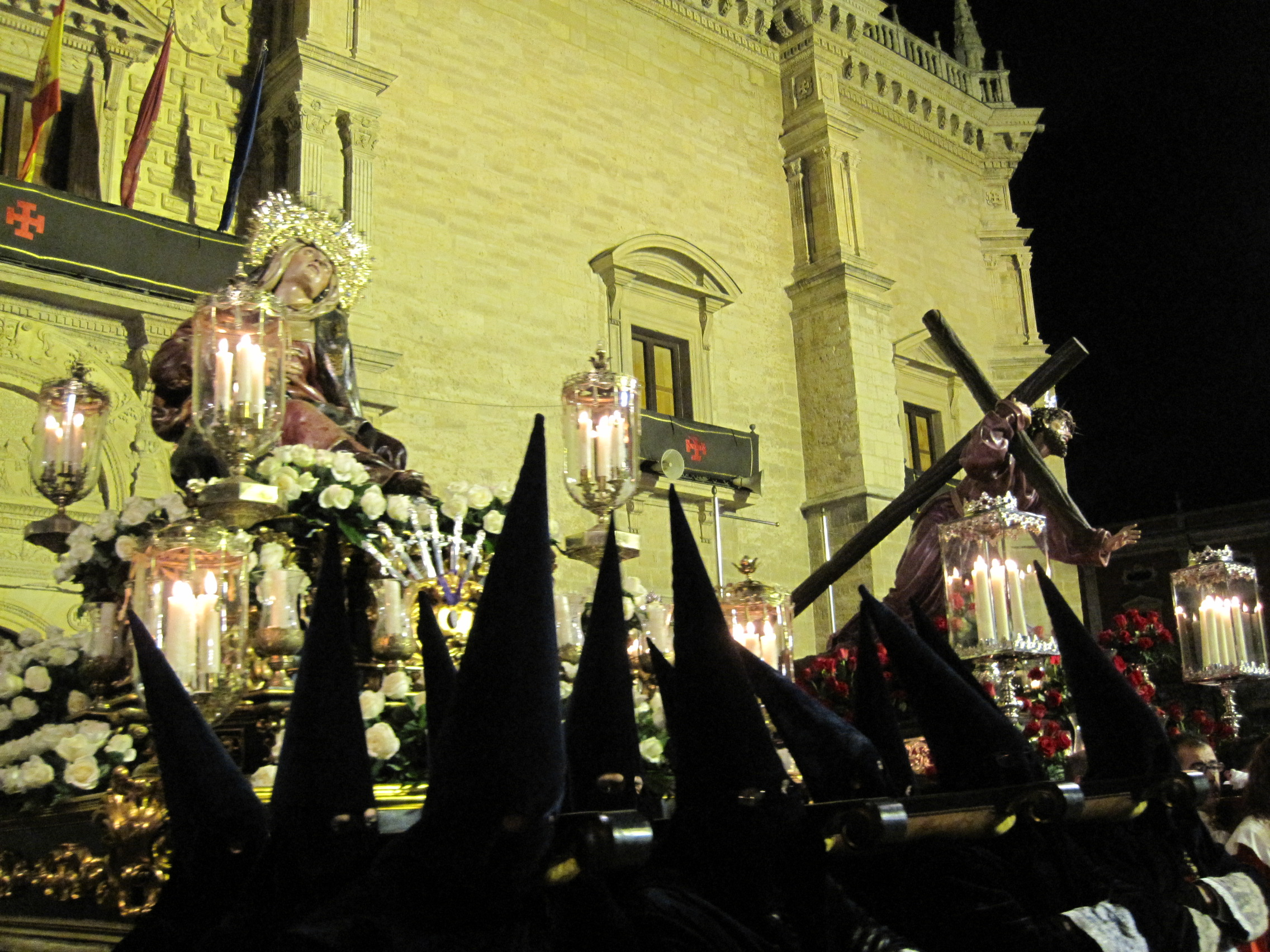
The Procession of the meeting takes place every Tuesday of Holy Week

- Tuesday of Holy Week: Our Lady of Anguish participates in the Procession of the Meeting (Spanish: Procesión del Encuentro)
- Good Friday, at 1am the brotherhood walks to the Cathedral of Valladolid with all its pasos in its main procession (Spanish: Procesión de Regla).
- Good Friday: the paso of the Virgin takes part in the General Procession of the Sacred Passion of the Redeemer(Spanish: Procesión General de la Sagrada Pasión del Redentor)
- Saturday of Holy Week, women of Valladolid escort our lady in the Procession of Loneliness (Spanish: Procesión de La Soledad)

== Bibliography ==
- Burrieza Sánchez, Javier. (Universidad de Valladolid). Cinco siglos de cofradías y procesiones Historia de la Semana Santa en Valladolid. Ayuntamiento de Valladolid. ISBN 84-95389-73-8
