= Gregorio Fernández =

Spanish artist (1576-1636)

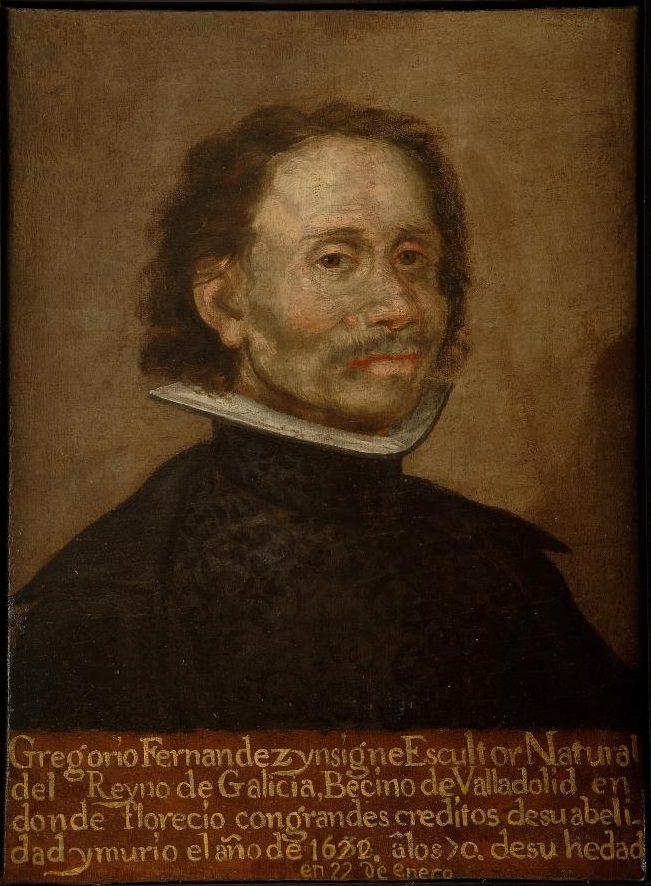
Portrait of Gregorio Fernández, National Sculpture Museum (Valladolid)

Gregorio Fernández (April 1576 – 22 January 1636) was a Spanish Baroque sculptor. He belongs to the Castilian school of sculpture, following the style of other great artists like Alonso Berruguete, Juan de Juni, Pompeyo Leoni, and Juan de Arfe.

== Biography ==
Gregorio Fernández was born in Sarria, in what is now the province of Lugo, Galicia. Later in his life he travelled to Valladolid, lured by the royal household. After working as an assistant in other studios, Gregorio Fernández founded his own, where he received many apprentices and collaborators and developed a huge activity thanks to his wide clientele.

After his death, Gregorio Fernández left many pupils who followed his style, but he did not have any significant disciples. He achieved great reputation during his life, a good example of this would be the fact that in his tomb in the convent of the Carmen Calzado a portrait of him was placed, painted by his friend Diego Valentín Díaz, accompanied by a text praising his work.

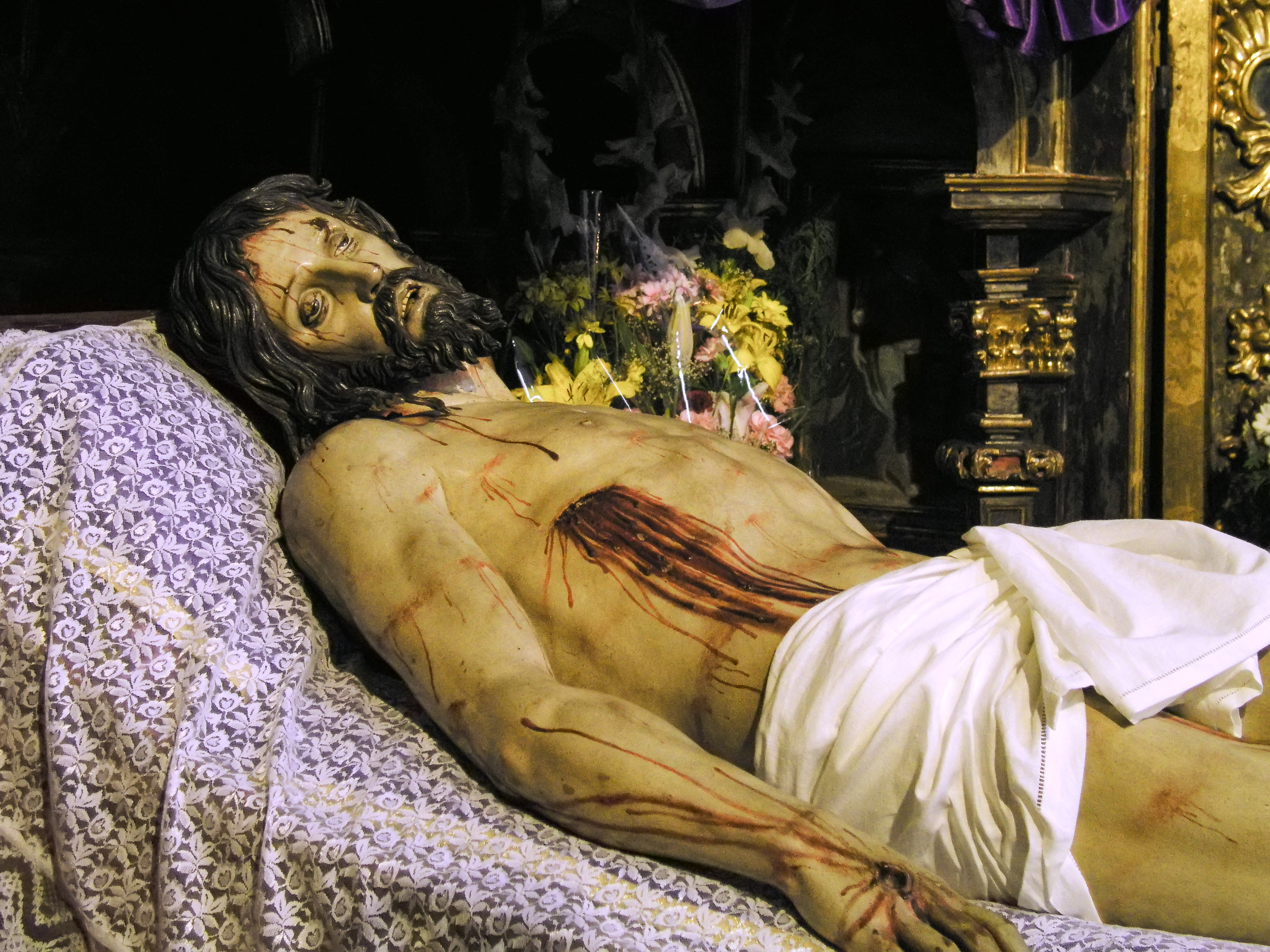
"Lying Christ", Church of San Miguel, Valladolid.

Gregorio Fernández was a great expert on his trade, which he practiced with high technical perfection. His extensive knowledge of the human body allowed him to create highly detailed anatomies with the hardness of bones, the tension of muscles, the tenderness of flesh or the smoothness of skin. Compared to the extreme expressiveness of the bodies, the robes are heavy, cardboard like, arranged in sharp and rigid folds which produce a strong contrast of light and shadow.

The deep expressive world of his figures swings between the dramatic quality of physical and moral pain and the evasion of mystical experience, and is expressed through calm postures and restrained gesticulation, leaving the greatest expressive influence to both face and hands, all of that in a simple composition.

The quality of his works was improved thanks to the extensive collaboration of painters who developed the polychrome of the statues. The embodiments are usually matte and plain colours stand out in the cloths, except for the small borders which are more colorful. The realism is accentuated with the help of added false elements which boost the feeling of authenticity: eyes are made of glass, nails and teeth of ivory, blood clots of cork, sweat drops and tears of resin.

Fernández created sculptures for altarpieces and “pasos procesionales”, like Camino del Calvario (Spanish for “the way to Calvary”). He made many iconographic images (Cristo Yacente, La Piedad, el Ecce Homo, Santa Teresa) which served as models for other artists for many years to come.

He died in Valladolid.

== Works ==
- San Martín partiendo la capa con un mendigo (1606). Church of San Martín (Valladolid)

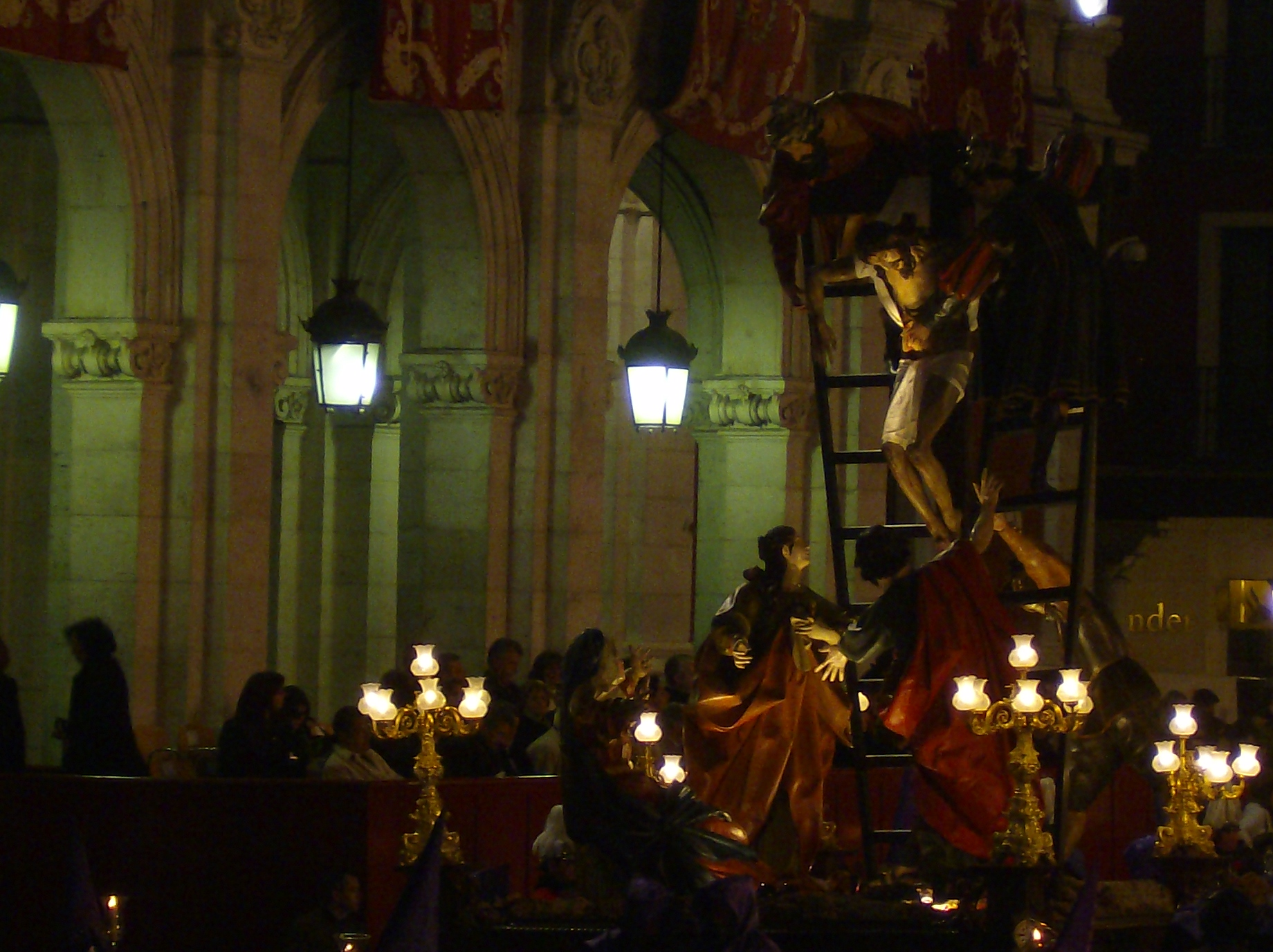
Passing by the deposition from the cross (El paso del Descendimiento)

- San Antolín (1606). Palencia Cathedral
- Arcángel Gabriel (1611). Museo Diocesano de Valladolid
- Arcángel San Miguel . Colegiata de San Miguel Arcángel, Alfaro (La Rioja)
- Santa Verónica (1614)
- Paso del Descendimiento de Cristo
- Christ at the Column
- Pietà
- Ecce Homo
- Cristo de los Balderas (1631). Church of San Marcelo (León)
- Cristo Yacente of El Pardo (Madrid)
- Cristo Yacente for the Duke of Lerma. Church of San Pablo (Valladolid)
- Éxtasis de Santa Teresa. National Sculpture Museum (Valladolid)
- Bautismo de Cristo. National Sculpture Museum (Valladolid)
- Cristo de la Luz. Palacio de Santa Cruz (Valladolid)
- Inmaculada Concepción. Church of La Vera Cruz (Salamanca)
- Main Altarpiece. Huelgas Reales (Valladolid)
- Main Altarpiece. Plasencia Cathedral (Cáceres)
- Altarpice. Descalzas Reales (Valladolid)
- Main Altarpiece. Miranda do Douro Cathedral (Portugal)
- Effigies for the Holy Week processions of Valladolid: "Sed Tengo" and "Camino del Calvario" (National Sculpture Museum), "El Entierro" (La Piedad and the two thieves in the National Sculpture Museum, and La Magdalena y San Juan in the church of Las Angustias), "La Coronación de Espinas" (Cristo Ecce Hommo in the church of La Vera-Cruz, and the executioners in the National Sculpture Museum), "La Flagelación" (Cristo atado a la columna in the church of La Vera-Cruz, and the executioners in the National Sculpture Museum), "El Descendimiento" and "La Virgen de la Vera Cruz", these last four property of the Cofradía Penitencial de la Santa Vera Cruz.
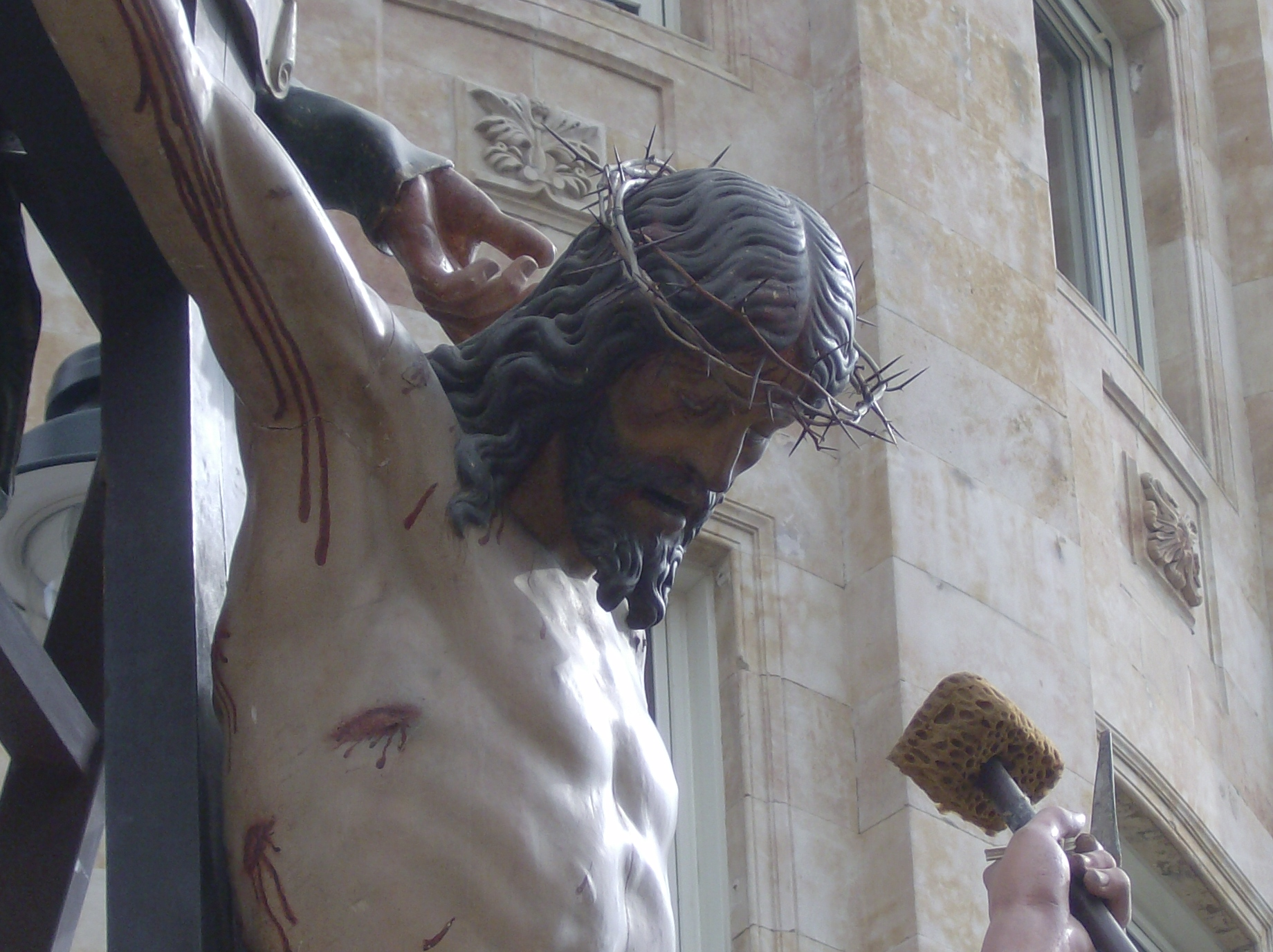
Paso "Sed Tengo" (1612–16)

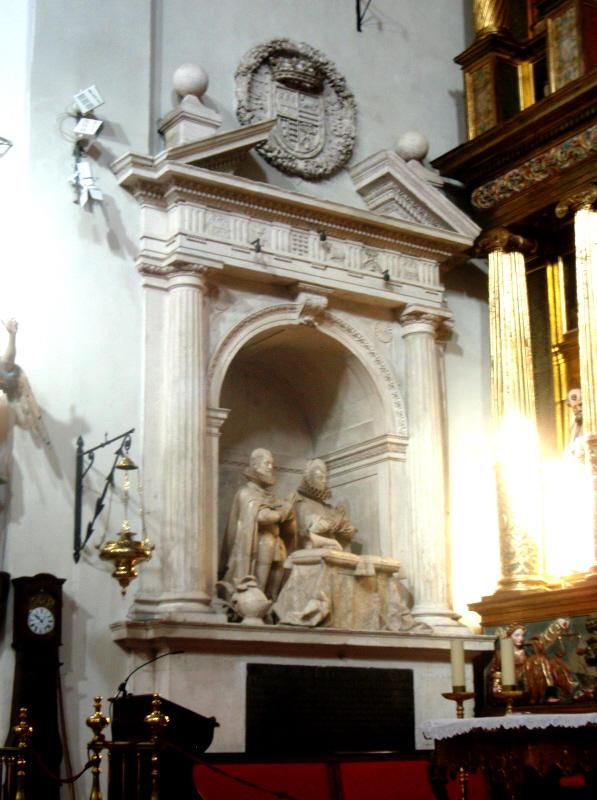
Funeral monument for Count of Fuensaldaña

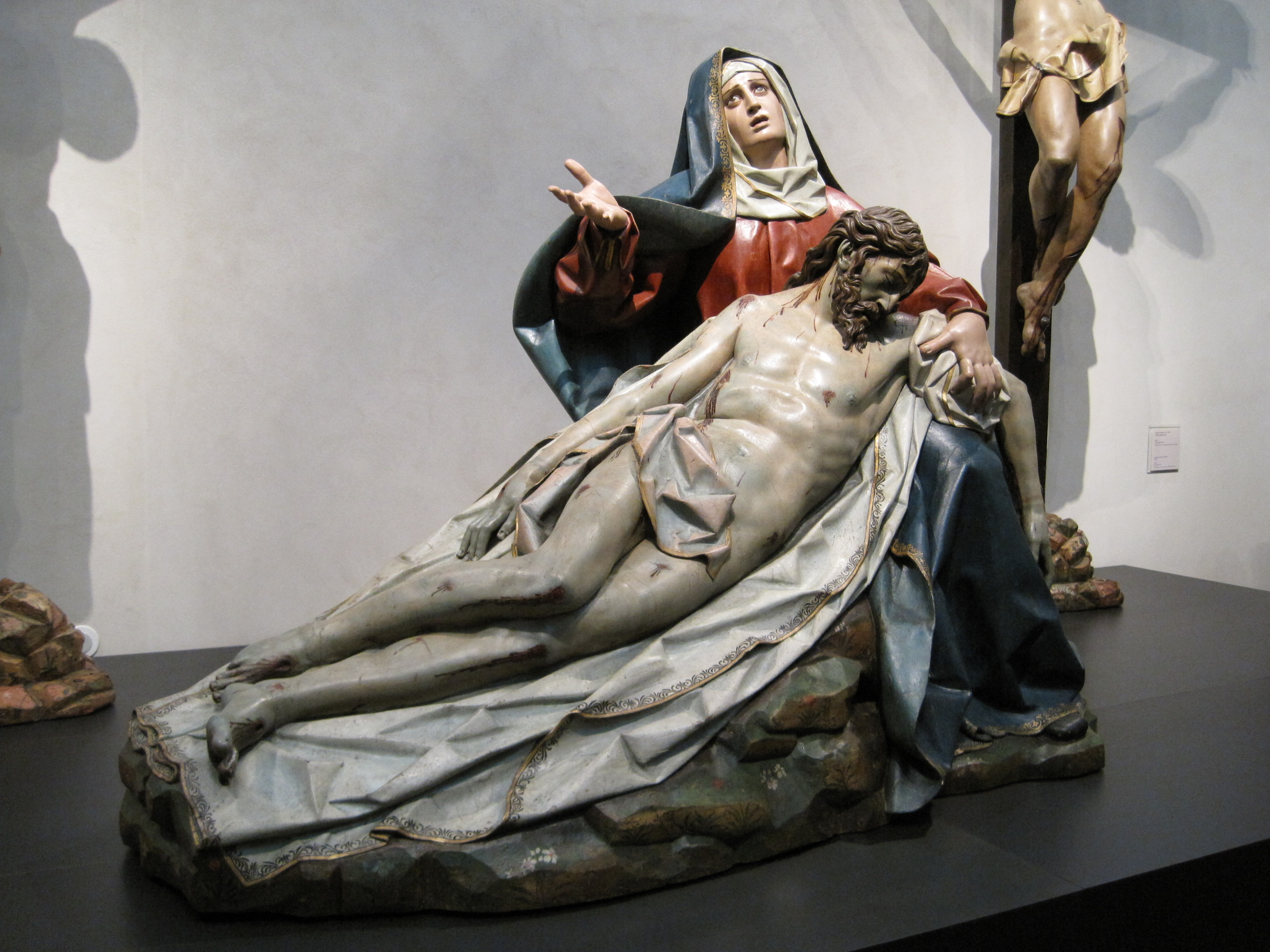
Pieta (La Sexta Angustia), (1616–17)

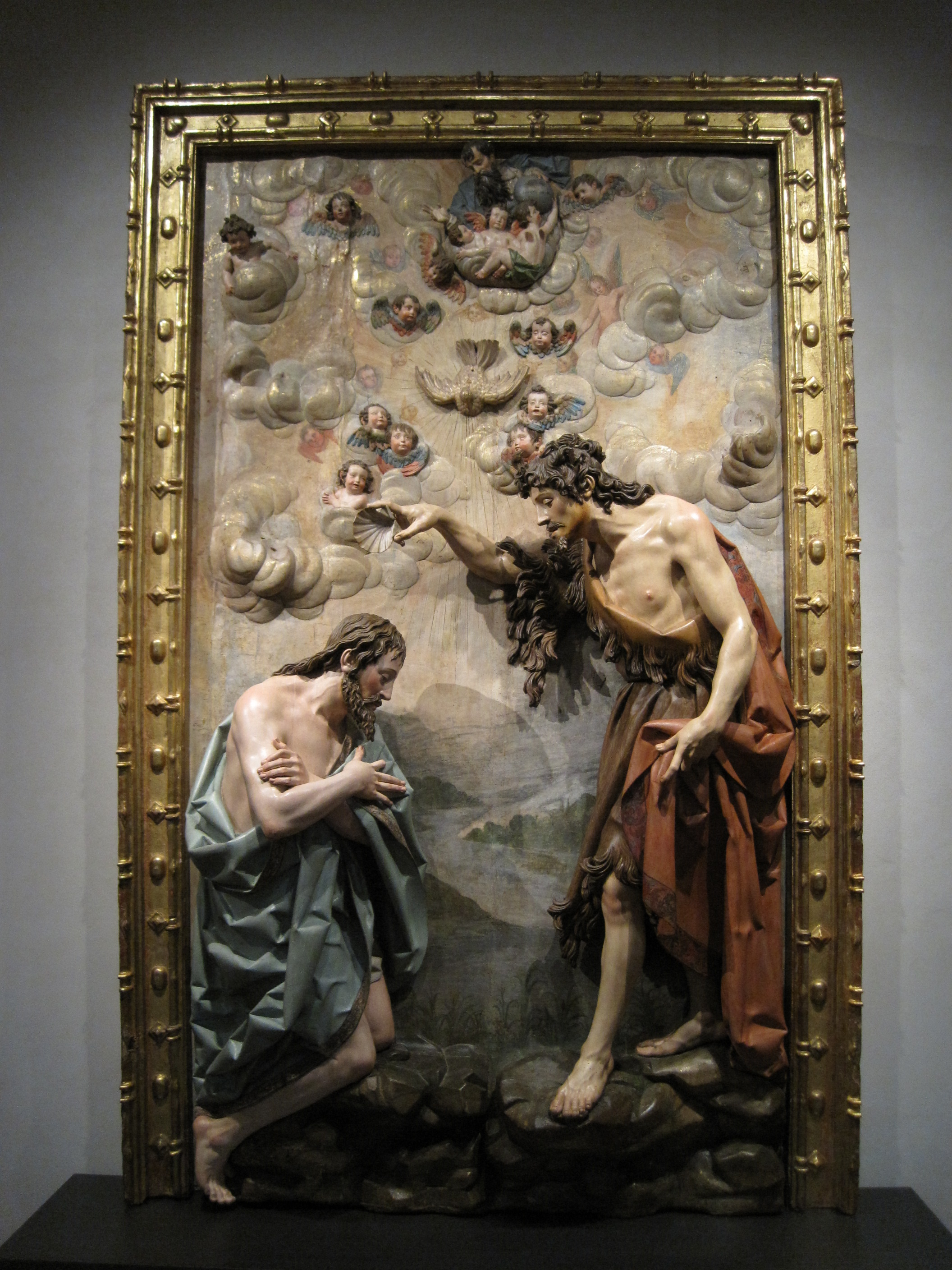
The Baptism of Christ(1624–28)

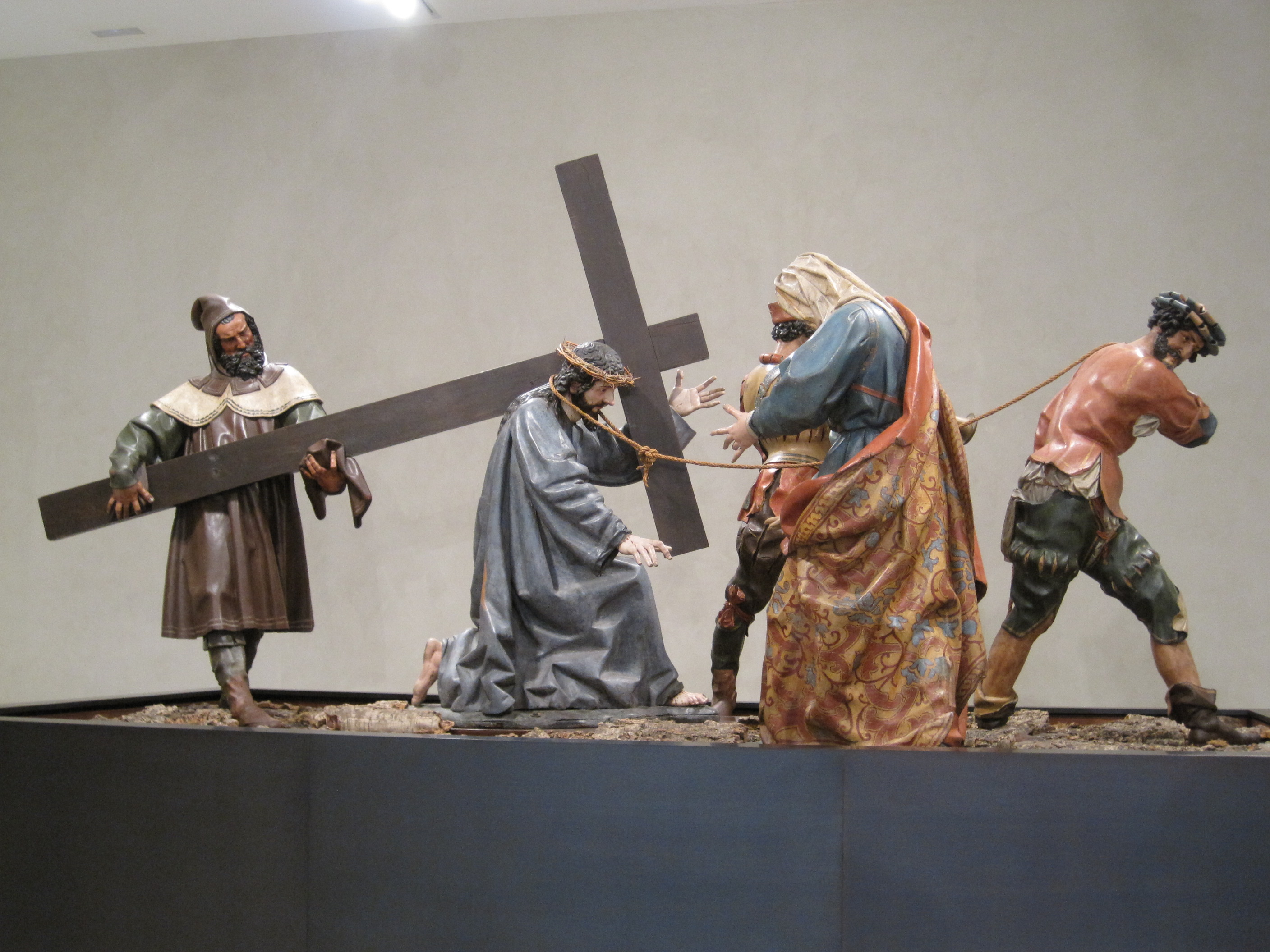
Paso Christ carrying the Cross (1614). Figure of Christ by Pedro de la Cuadra (c.1600)

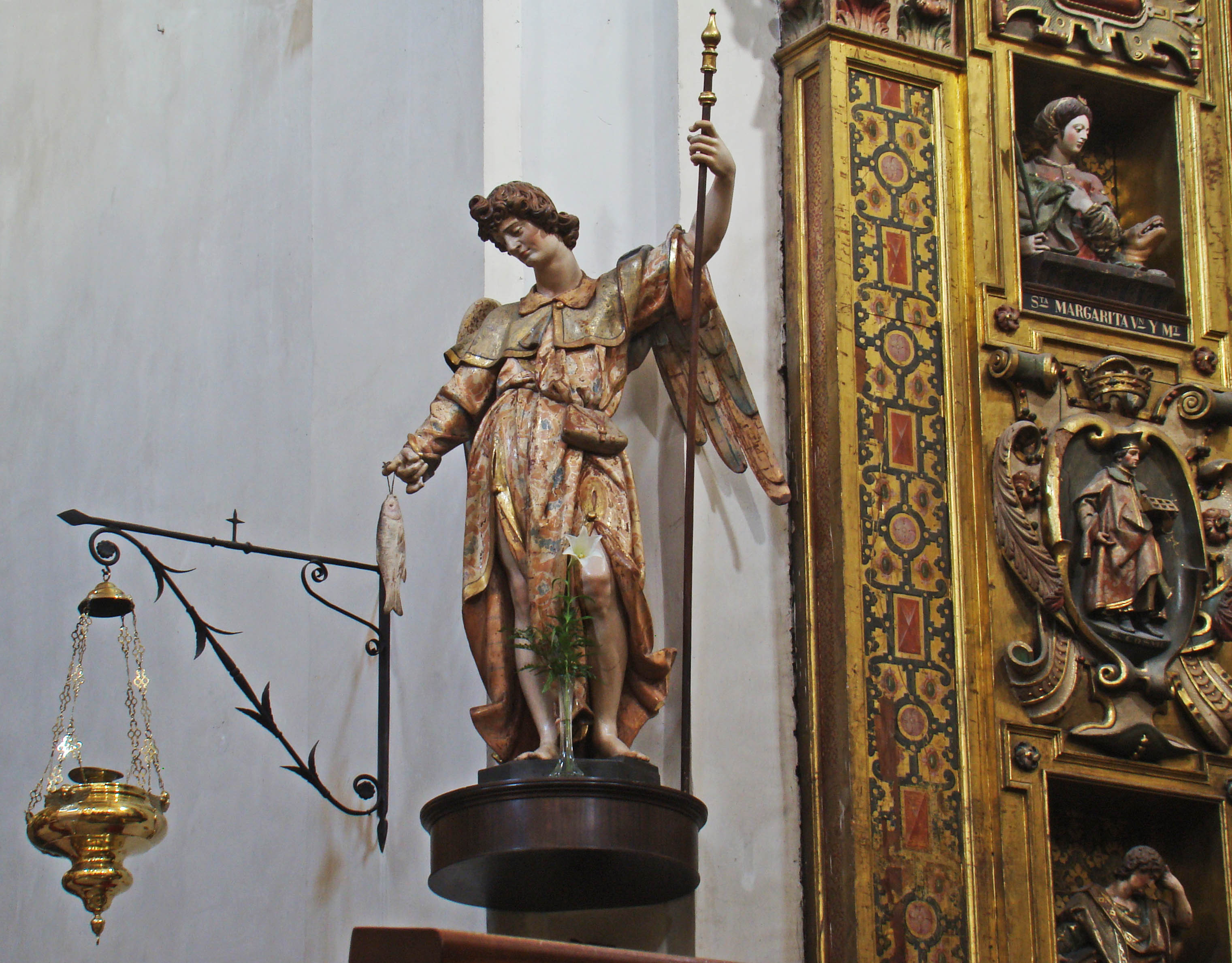
Raphael (archangel)

== Sources ==
- Martín González, Juan José, Escultura barroca castellana. 2 vols. Madrid. Fundación Lázaro Galdiano. 199.
- Martín González, Juan José, El escultor Gregorio Fernández. Madrid. Ministerio de cultura. 1980.
- Otero Túñez, Ramón, Evolución estilística de Gregorio Fernández, in Boletín de la Universidad de Santiago. 1957.
- Río y de la Hoz, Isabel del, Gregorio Fernández y su escuela. Cuadernos de Arte Español. Madrid. Historia 16. 1991
- North Fowler, Harold, A History of Sculpture. Kessinger Publishing. 2005
