= Paso (float) =

Float made for religious parades

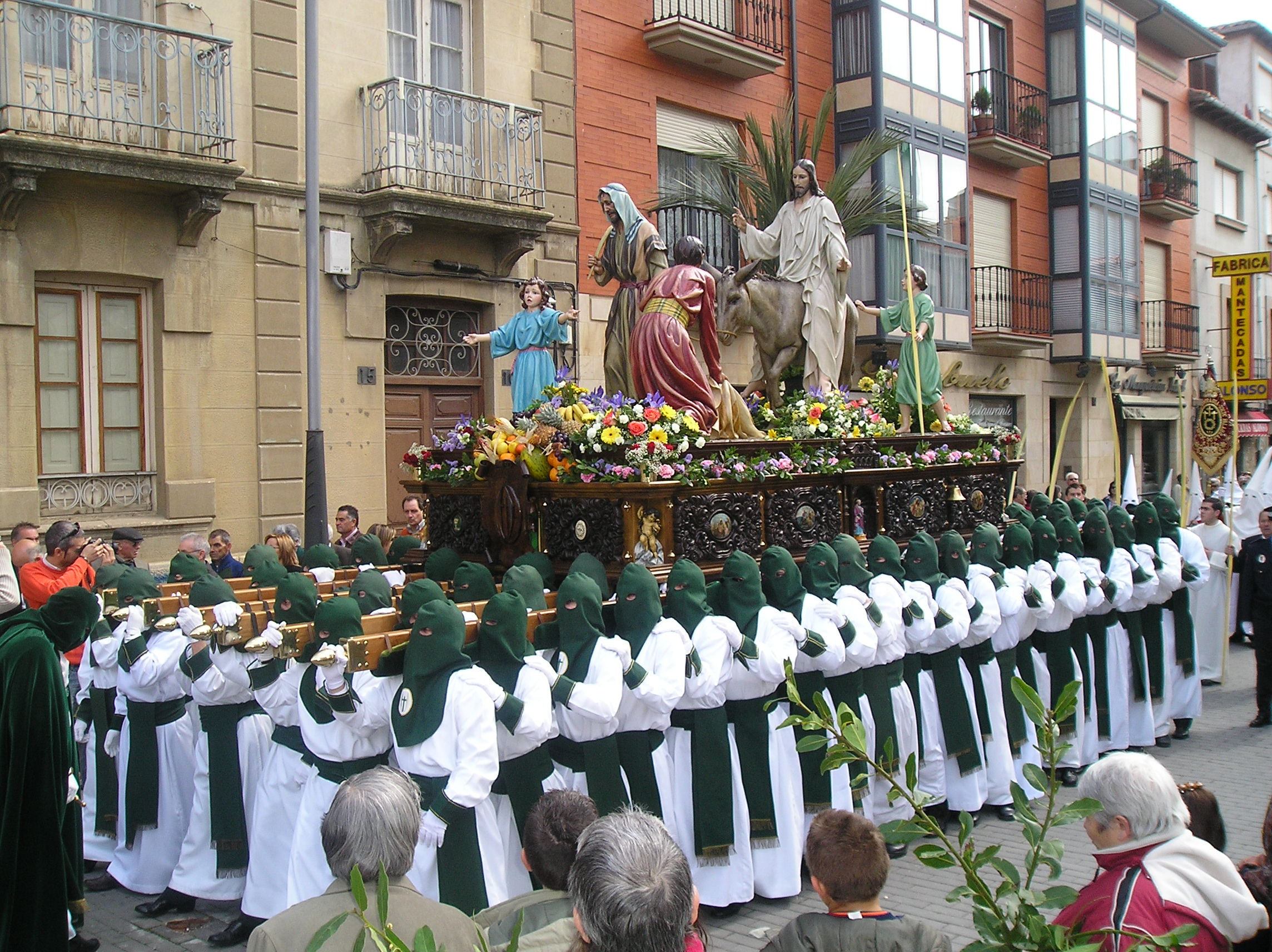
A large paso in Astorga, Spain, depicting the triumphal entry of Christ into Jerusalem

A paso (Spanish for 'Episode of the Passion of Christ') is an elaborate float made for religious processions. They are carried by porters on staves, like a litter or sedan chair, and are usually followed or escorted by a band. Some have long skirts that cover the bearers entirely, giving the impression that the statue is floating on its own power.

The porters are called costaleros, cargadores or portadores and their leader is called a capataz ('Foreman' or 'Head Man'). The capataz sets the chicotá, the period of time between a paso being lifted and set down again; the costaleros cannot pick up or set down the paso except by his leave. This is signalled by the llamador ('crier'), a knocker on the front of the float. During Semana Santa ('Holy Week', the week preceding Easter) the custom is to make pasos adorned with large wooden statues of Jesus Christ, the Virgin Mary, saints and biblical personalities from the Passion.

In Italy smaller carried floats are known as macchine a spalla. In the Philippines, the term for shoulder-borne floats and palanquins is andas. Carriages for larger, life-sized icons have wheels and are instead called carrozas. Both types may carry small icons and are borne or pulled by at least two people; they may have lighting fixtures for nighttime or dawn processions, with some having canopies above the image or scene.

== See also ==
Media related to Pasos at Wikimedia Commons

== Bibliography ==
- Seville's Holy Week Rituals Draw In an Outsider (New York Times: March 26, 2006)
