= List of Bienes de Interés Cultural in the Province of Valladolid =

This is a list of Bien de Interés Cultural landmarks in the Province of Valladolid, Spain.

- Castle of La Mota
- Castle of Torrelobatón
- Peñafiel Castle
- Portillo Castle
- Colegio de San Gregorio (National Sculpture Museum (Valladolid))
- Convent of Las Descalzas Reales (Valladolid)
- Church of Santa María La Antigua
- Church of San Benito el Real
- Church of San Pablo
- Monastery of Nuestra Señora del Prado
- Monastery of Santa María de Retuerta
- National Museum of Sculpture
- Plaza del Coso
- Royal Audiencia and Chancillería of Valladolid (Palacio de los Vivero/Los Vivero Palace)
- Valladolid Cathedral
- Valladolid Royal Palace
- Palace of Pimentel
- Palace of Santa Cruz
- Royal Convent of Santa Clara
- St Mary's Church, Wamba
- Valbuena Abbey
- Church of Santa María Magdalena (Matapozuelos)
