= Monastery of Nuestra Señora del Prado =

- Monasterio de Nuestra Señora del Prado (Spanish)
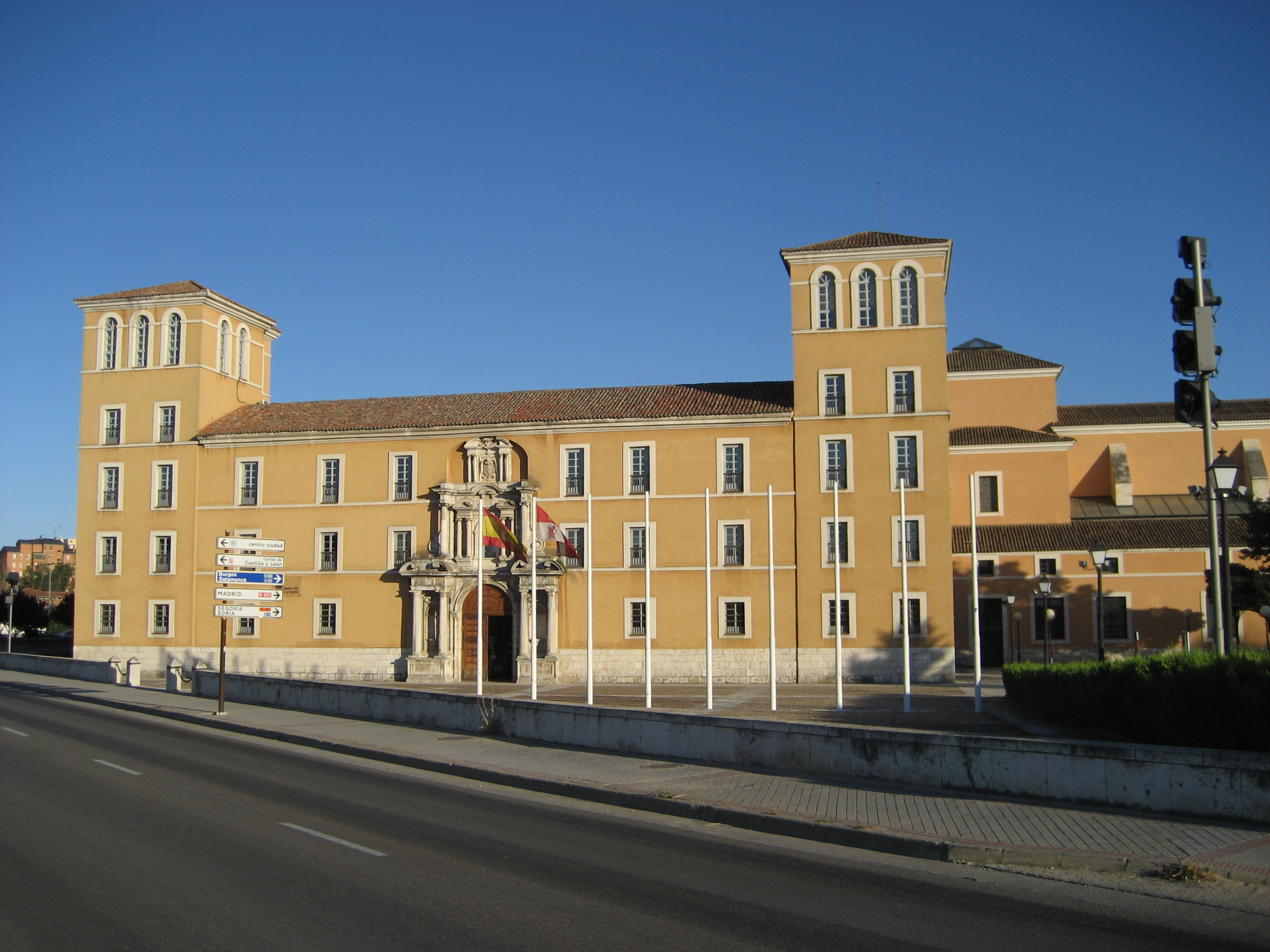

- Location within Spain
- 41.640858°N 4.74585°W
- Location: Valladolid, Spain

Spanish Cultural Heritage
- Official name: Monasterio de Nuestra Señora del Prado
- Type: Non-movable
- Criteria: Monument
- Designated: 1877
- Reference no.: RI-51-0000020

The Monastery of Nuestra Señora del Prado (Spanish: Monasterio de Nuestra Señora del Prado) is a monastery located in the city of Valladolid, Spain. It was declared Bien de Interés Cultural in 1877.

== See also ==
- List of Bien de Interés Cultural in the Province of Valladolid
