= Juan de Juni =

French sculptor

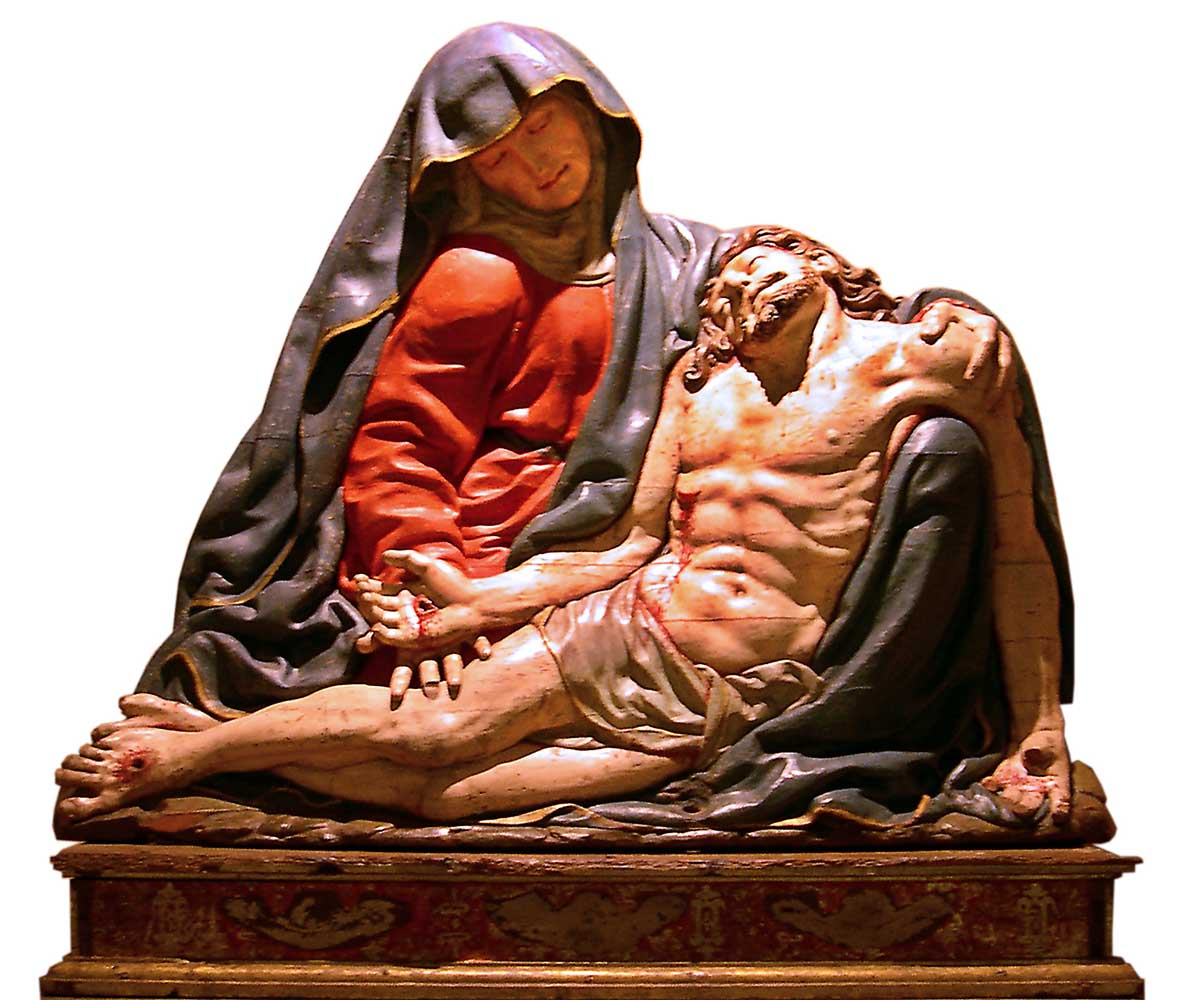
Piedad de Medina del Campo (1575)

Juan de Juni (Fr. Jean de Joigny; c. 1507–1577) was a French–Spanish sculptor, who also worked as a painter and architect.

== Career ==
Juan de Juni was born in Joigny, France, but began working in Italy, where he was first employed. In 1533 he went to live in León and Medina de Rioseco before moving to Valladolid in 1540. He was best known as a religious sculptor who incorporated great emotion into his figures.

== Selected works ==
- Lamentation of Christ. Polychrome wood. National Sculpture Museum (Valladolid).
- Altarpiece for the church of Santa María La Antigua (Valladolid), now in the Cathedral of Valladolid.
- Entombment. Polychrome wood. Segovia Cathedral.
- Virgin with seven knives. Polychrome wood.

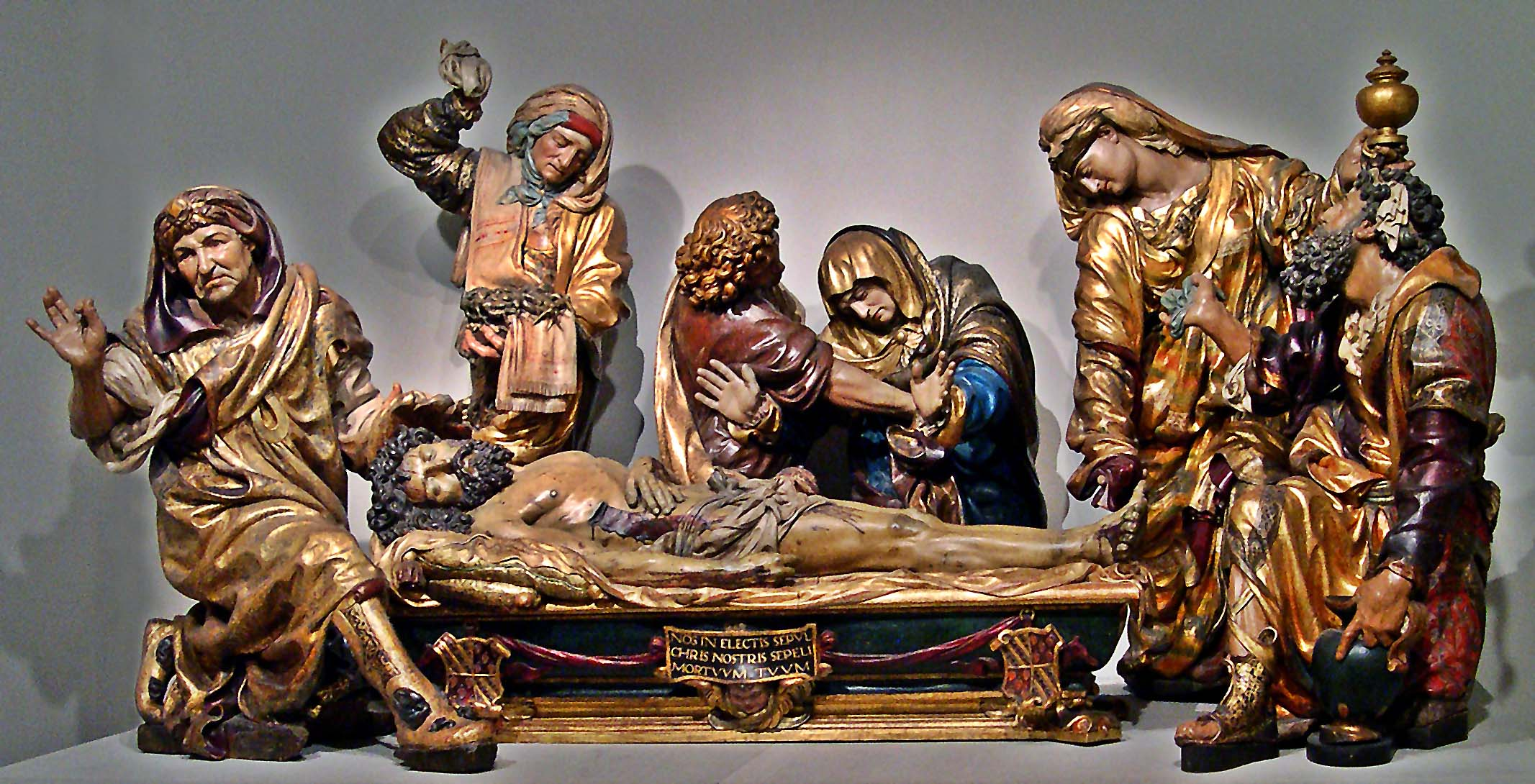
Entombment. Valladolid
