= Santa María La Antigua =

Church in Valladolid, Spain

Iglesia de Nuestra Señora de la Antigua Church of Our Lady of the Antique
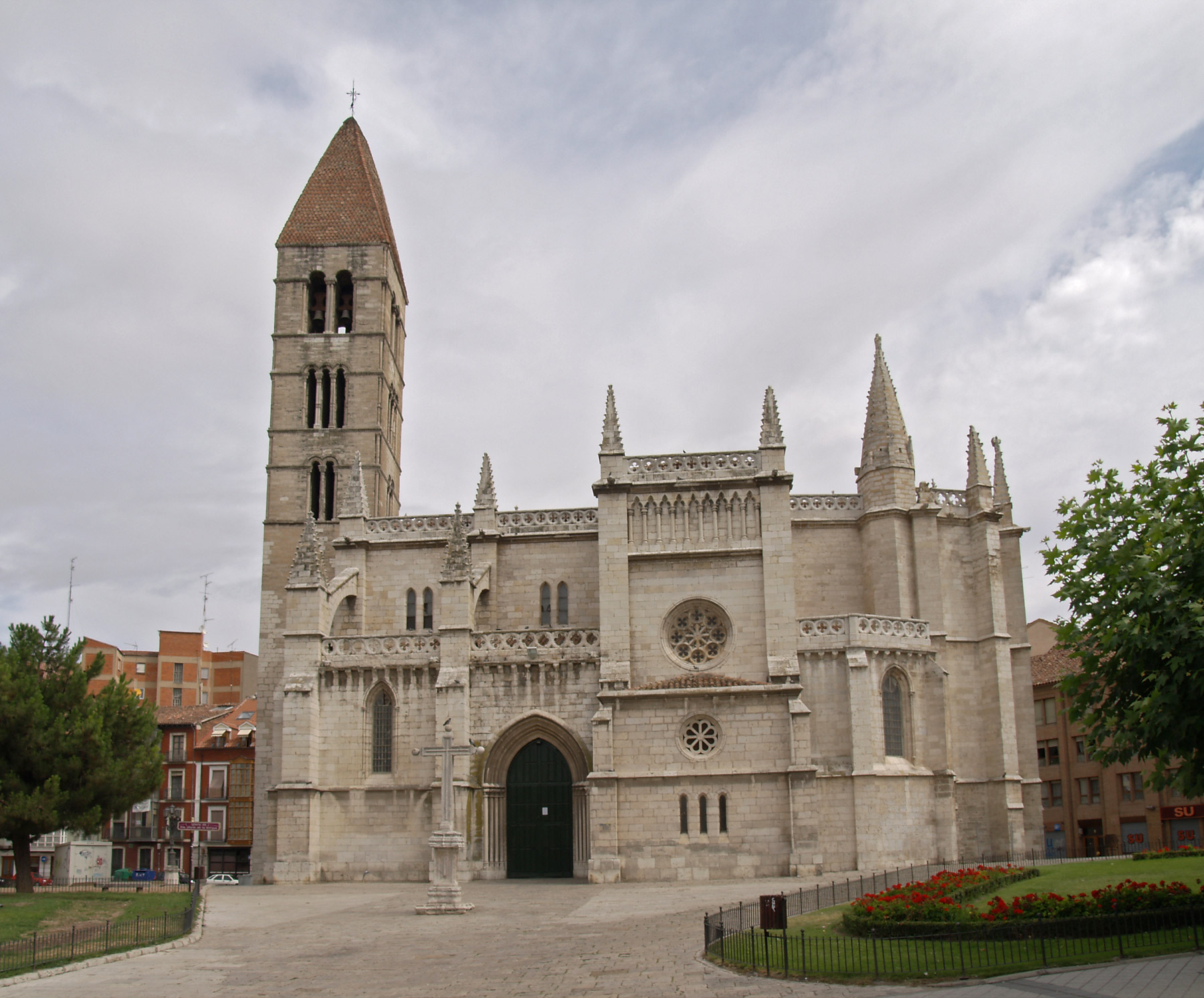
- View of the church.

Religion
- Affiliation: Roman Catholic
- Diocese: Valladolid
- Status: Active

Location
- Location: Valladolid, Province of Valladolid, Castile and León, Spain
- Interactive map of Iglesia de Nuestra Señora de la Antigua; Church of Our Lady of the Antique
- Coordinates: 41.6570°N 4.7245°W

Architecture
- Style: Isabelline Gothic (Gothic), Renaissance
- Completed: 1088-1952
- Spanish Cultural Heritage
- Official name: Iglesia de Santa María La Antigua
- Type: Monument
- Designated: 08-05-1897
- Reference no.: RI-51-0000077

The Church of Saint Mary the Ancient (Spanish: Santa María La Antigua) is a 12th-century church in Valladolid, central Spain. It was declared Bien de Interés Cultural in 1897.

== History ==
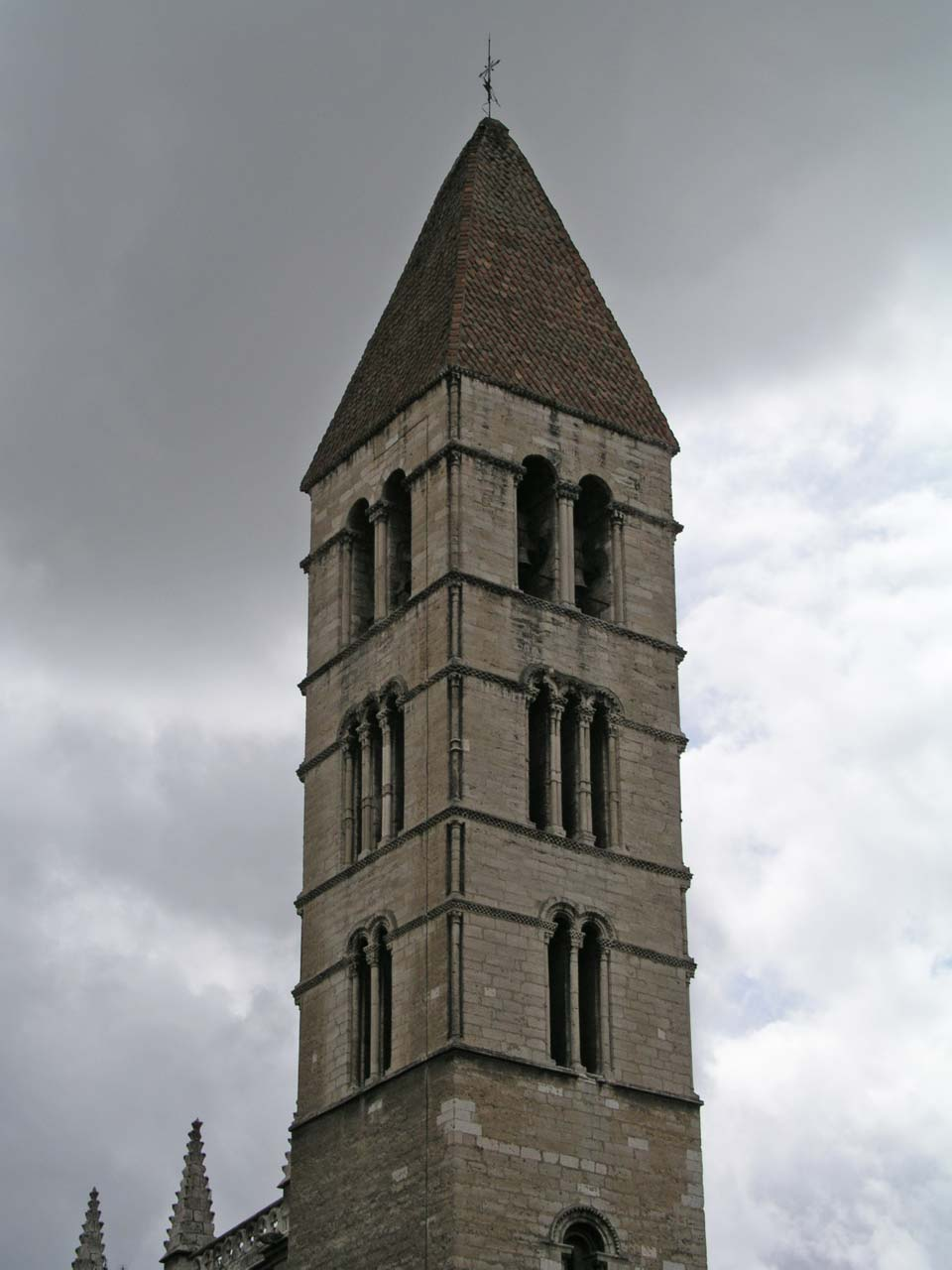
The bell tower.

Underneath the current building, remains of foundations have been found of a Roman hypocaustum. The church was likely founded in 1095 by Count Pedro Ansúrez, although there are no remains of this original structure. The oldest parts of the current temple dates back to the late 12th century: the gallery on the northern side of the building and the tower, both were built in Romanesque style. The tower, one of the symbols of Valladolid, has four floors, the upper three featuring windows, and a pyramidal top.

In the 14th century, most of the existing structure was demolished, leaving the tower and portico the only remaining Romanesque features. The later Gothic style followed that of Burgos Cathedral. Santa María La Antigua has three aisles, with three polygonal apses and a transept. The nave and the aisles are rib-vaulted.

Due to poor design and construction and the increasing size of the parish population, the building underwent successive additions and reparations: in the mid-16th century, architect Rodrigo Gil de Hontañón restored the collapsing building, adding buttresses and several windows.

Also from this period date the high altar retablo, by Juan de Juni (1550-1562; now in the Valladolid Cathedral). Several Baroque altarpieces were executed for the church's interior during the 17th and 18th centuries, hiding the original Gothic appearance.

In the early 20th century the building was extensively restored and rebuilt to show its original Romanesque-Gothic appearance, following the doctrines of the French architect Eugène Emmanuel Viollet-le-Duc.

== Gallery ==
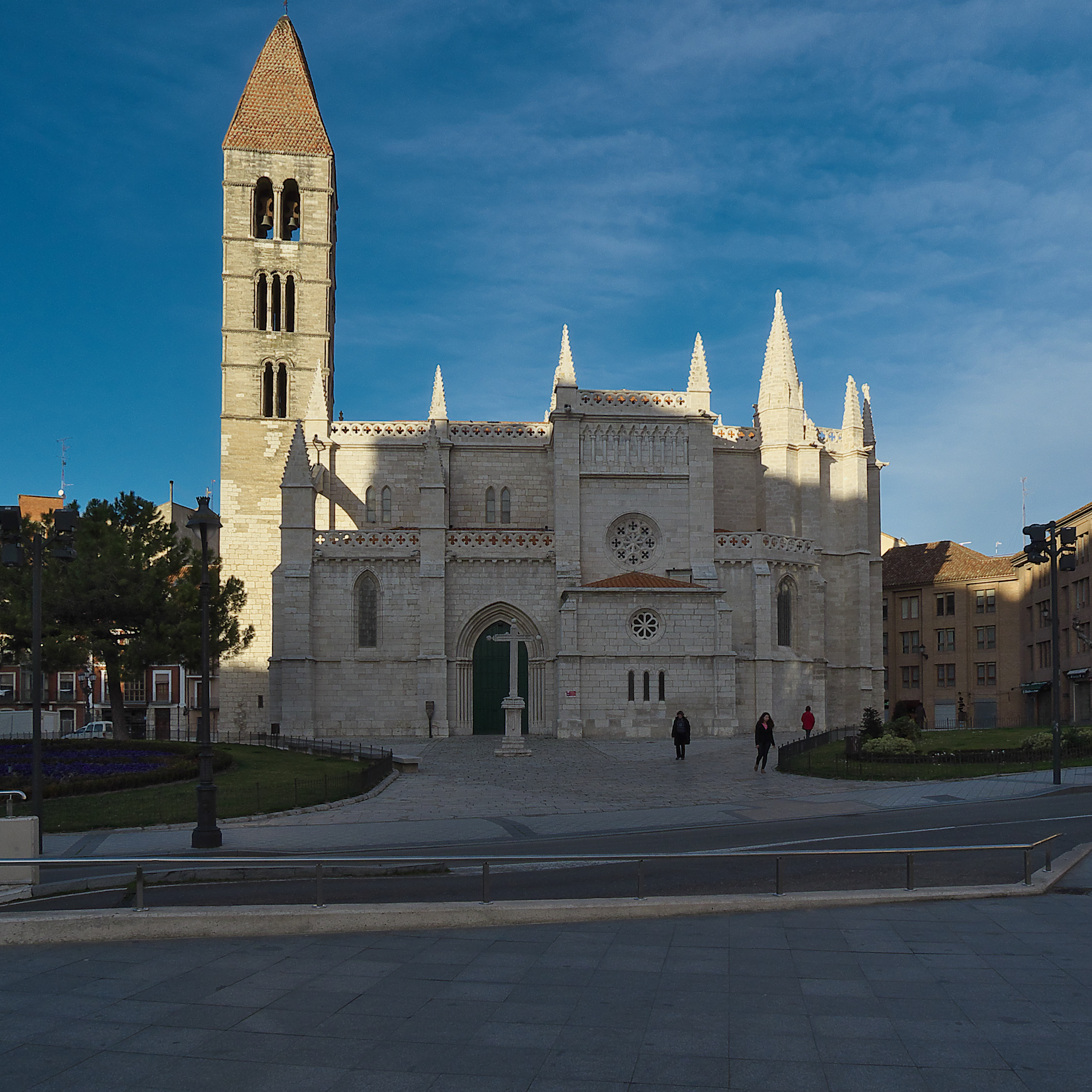
in the present

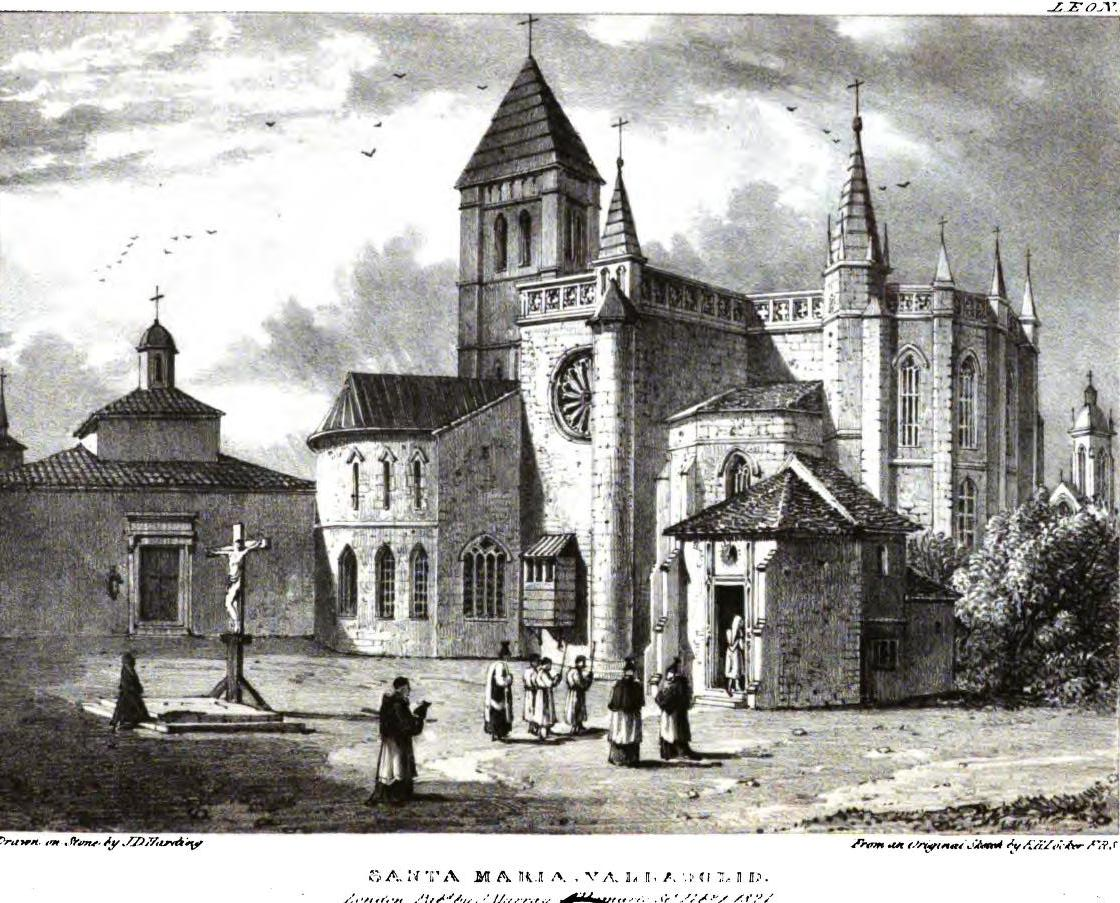
Santa María Antigua in 1823 by Edward Hawke Locker

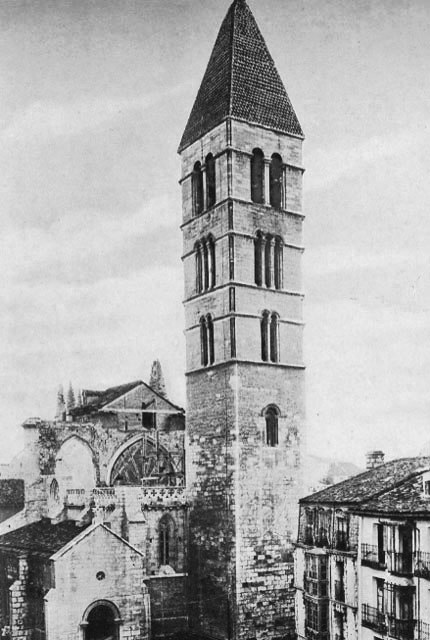
early 20th century

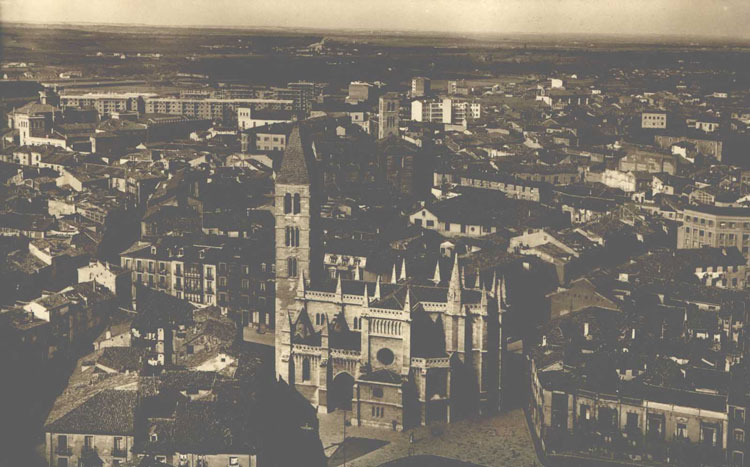
at 1950s

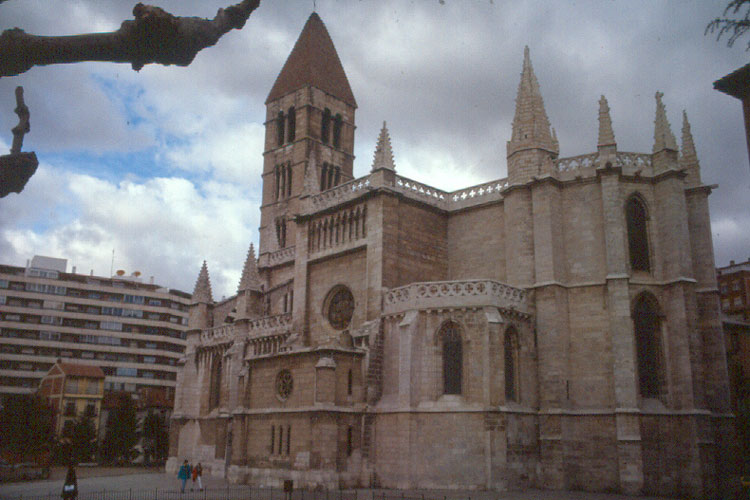
at 1980s

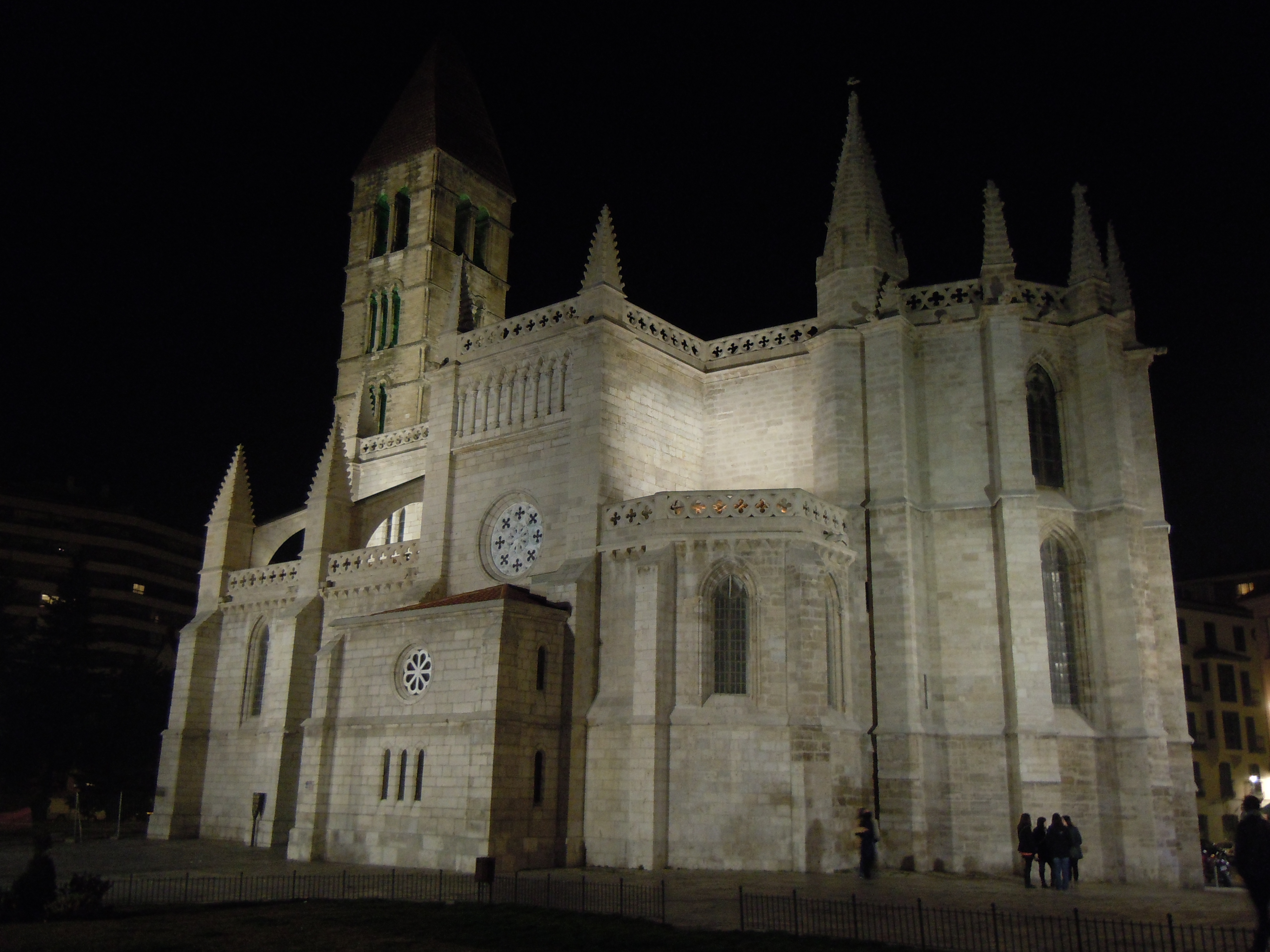
at night

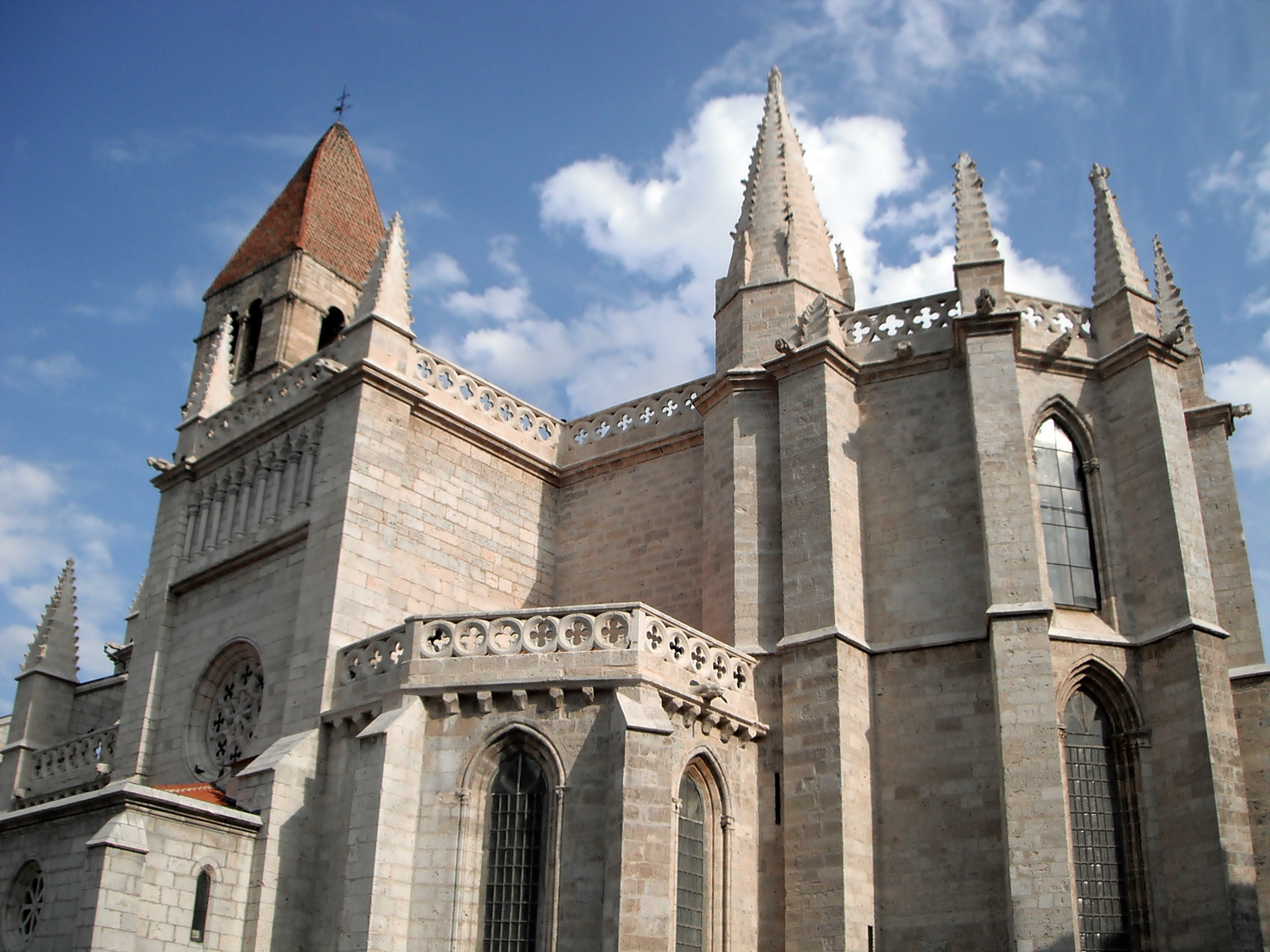
view

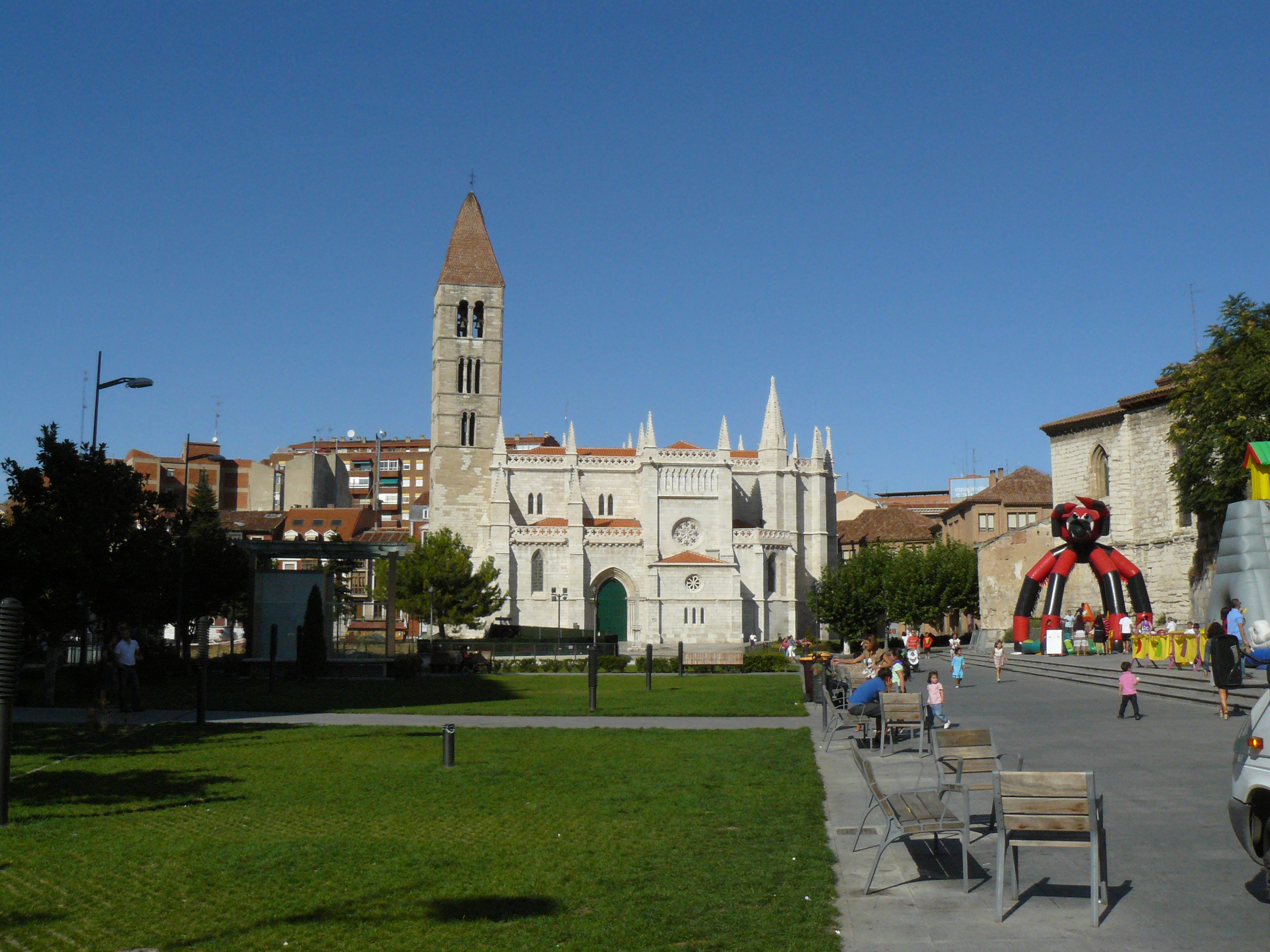
Portugalete Square

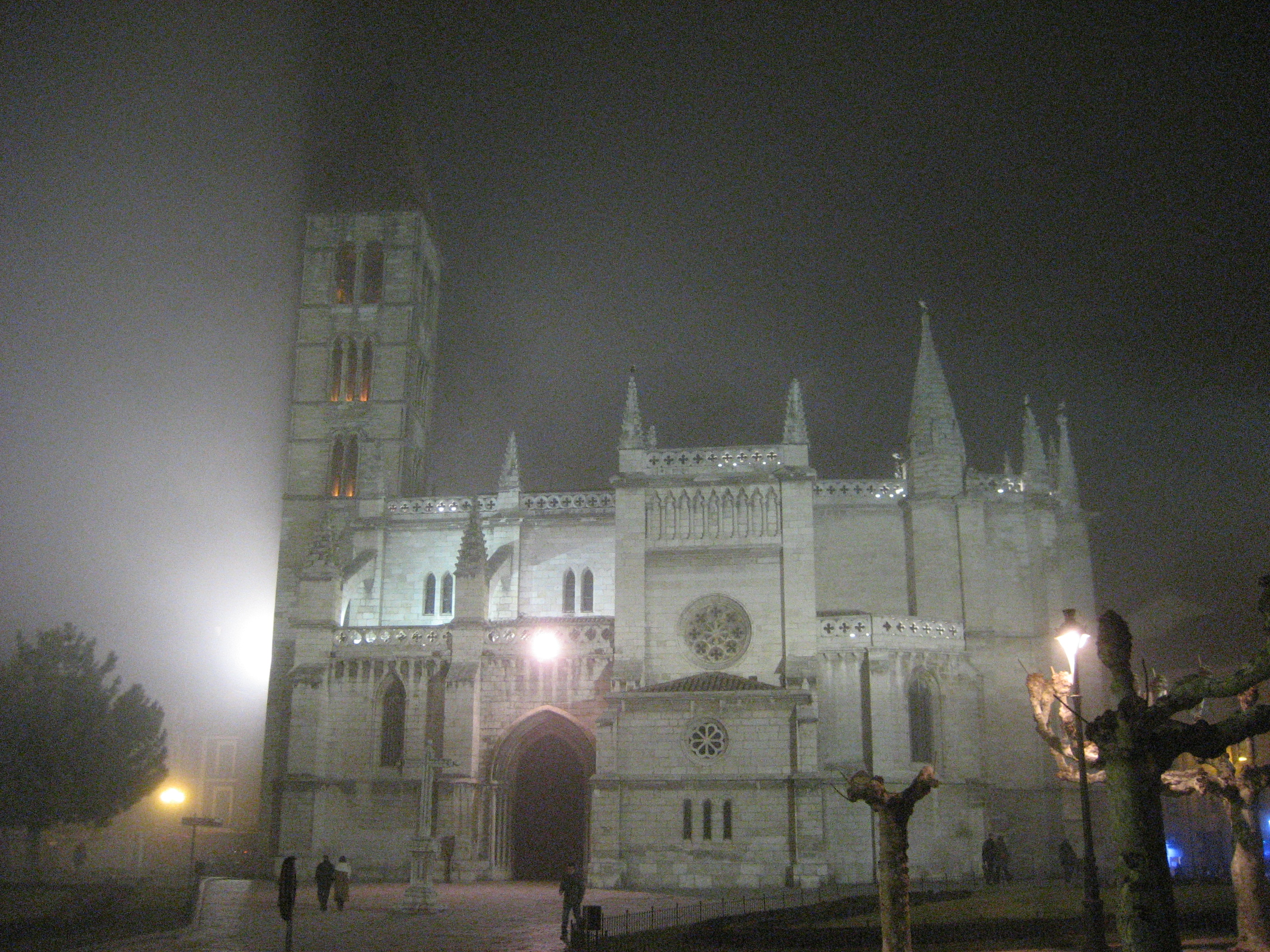
Front view of La Antigua Church in a misty winter night

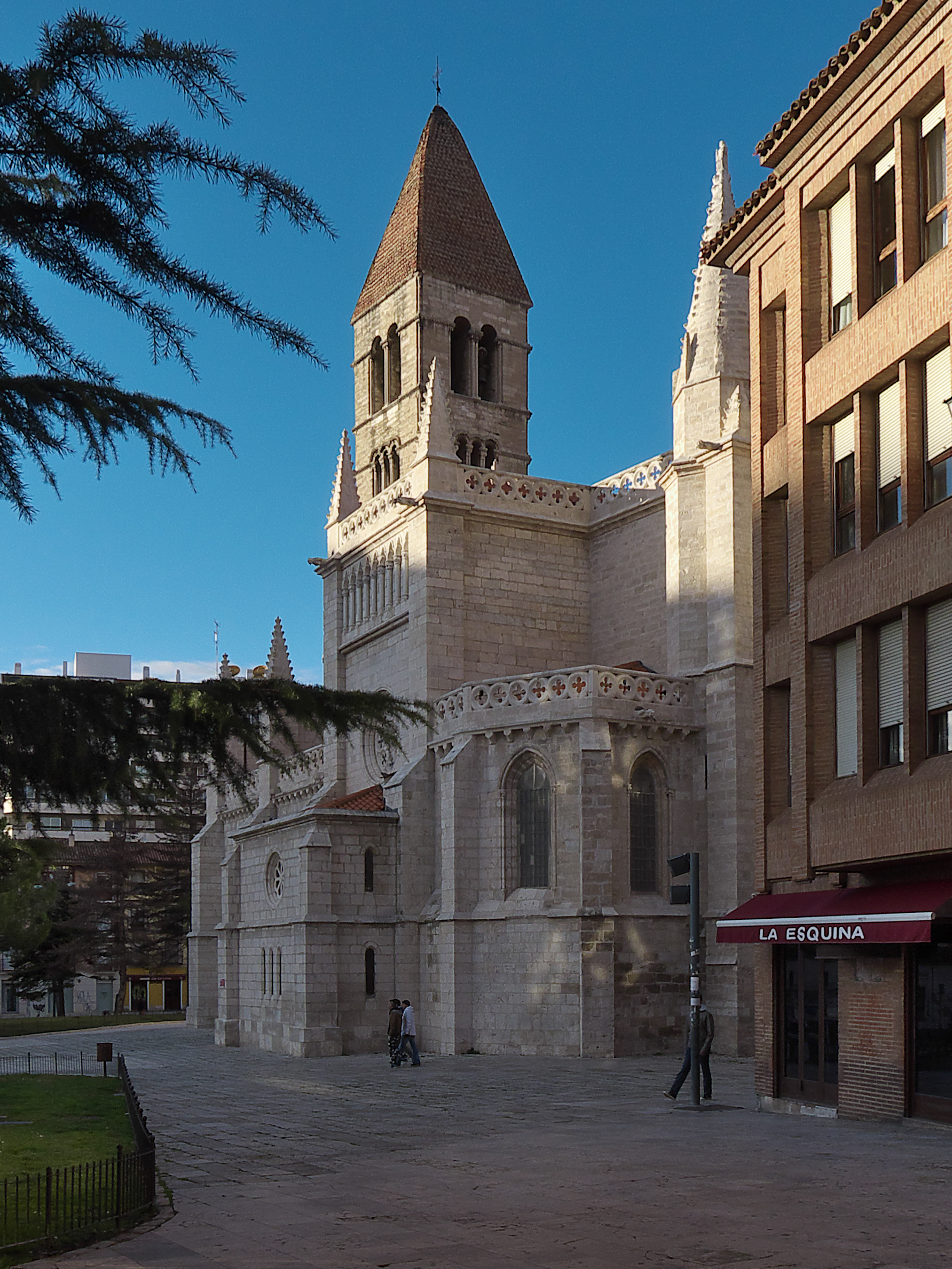
Side view of 2014

== See also ==
- List of Bien de Interés Cultural in the Province of Valladolid
