= Valladolid Cathedral =

Church in Valladolid, Spain

Cathedral of Our Lady of the Holy Assumption
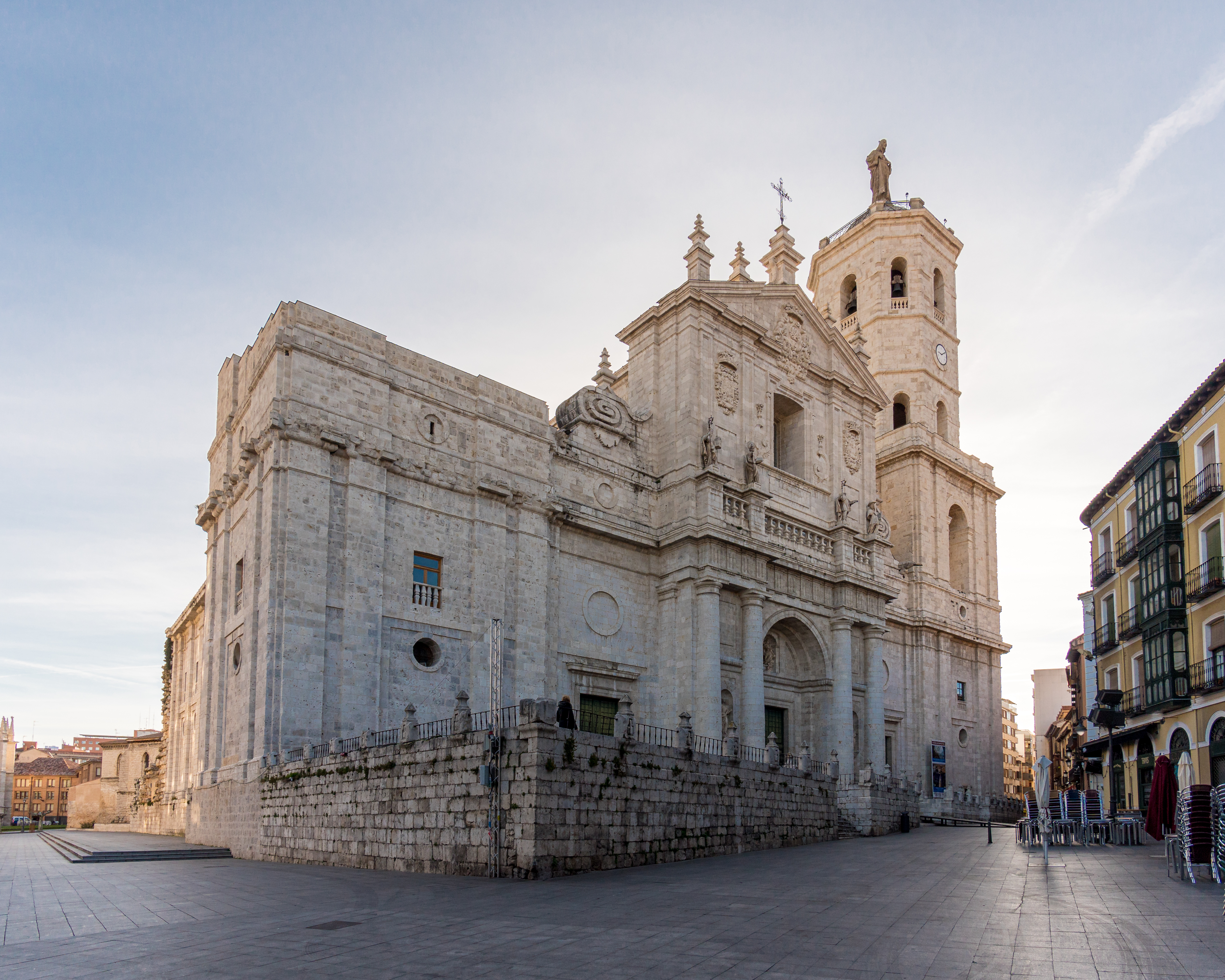
- Main view of the Cathedral

- Location within Spain

Religion
- Affiliation: Catholic Church
- Diocese: Valladolid
- Rite: Roman Rite
- Year consecrated: 1668
- Status: Active

Location
- Location: Valladolid, Province of Valladolid, Castile and León, Spain
- Coordinates: 41.652222°N 4.723611°W

Architecture
- Architect: Juan de Herrera
- Type: church
- Style: Herrerian, Renaissance
- Groundbreaking: 1589
- Direction of façade: Southeast
- Spanish Cultural Heritage
- Official name: Catedral de Nuestra Señora de la Asunción de Valladolid
- Designated: 3 June 1931
- Reference no.: RI-51-0000980

Website
- www.catedral-valladolid.com

The Cathedral of Our Lady of the Holy Assumption (Spanish: Catedral de Nuestra Señora de la Asunción), better known as Valladolid Cathedral, is a Catholic church in Valladolid, Spain. The main layout was designed by Juan de Herrera in a Renaissance-style.

The original design for this cathedral would have created a church which would have been the largest cathedral in Europe. Initially planned as the cathedral for the capital city of Spain, ultimately only 40-45% of the intended project was completed, due to lack of resources after the court moved towards Madrid, and the expenses caused by the difficult foundations of the building, which was located in an area with a large gap in the field.

== History ==
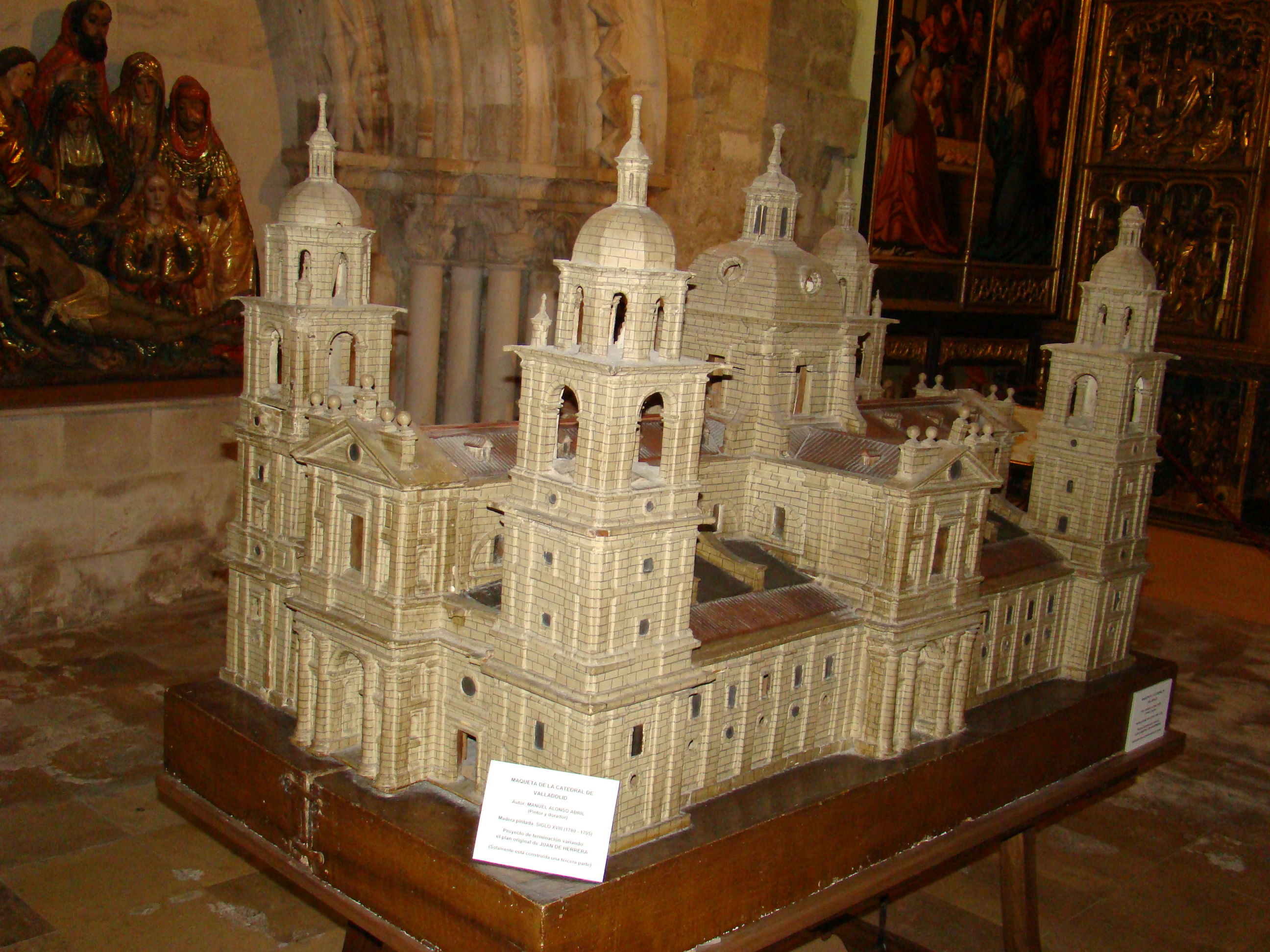
Model of the cathedral of Valladolid. Completion project varying Juan de Herrera's original plan. Painted wood, (1780-1795) by Manuel Alonso Abril.

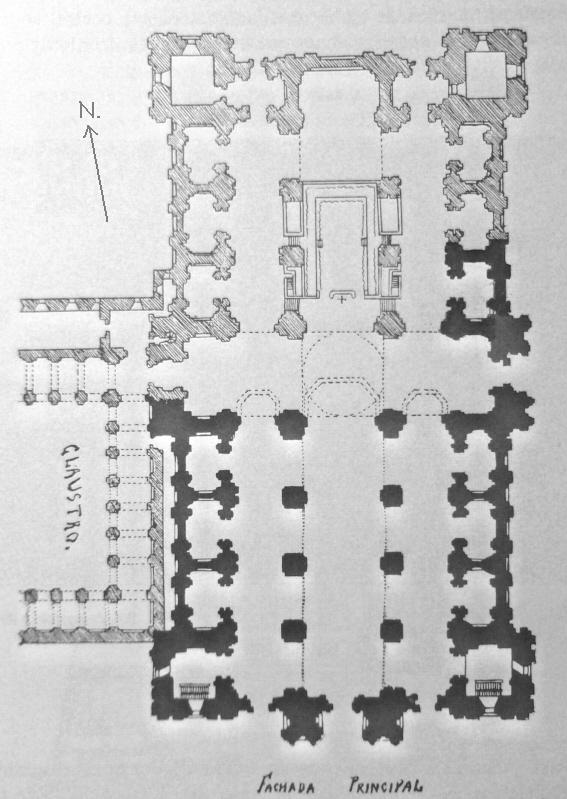
Present church outlined in black; hatchmarks delineate entire plan, and demonstrate the planned three naves and apses

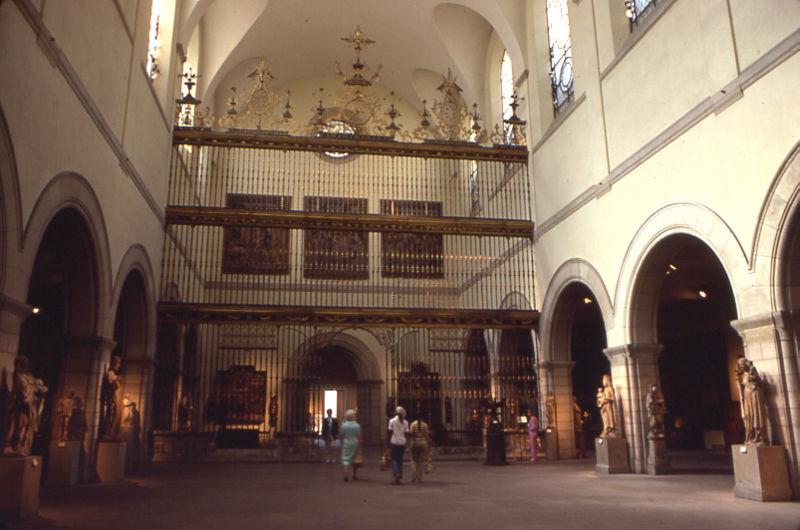
Gate of the cathedral, sold in 1956, currently exhibited in New York's Metropolitan Museum of Art

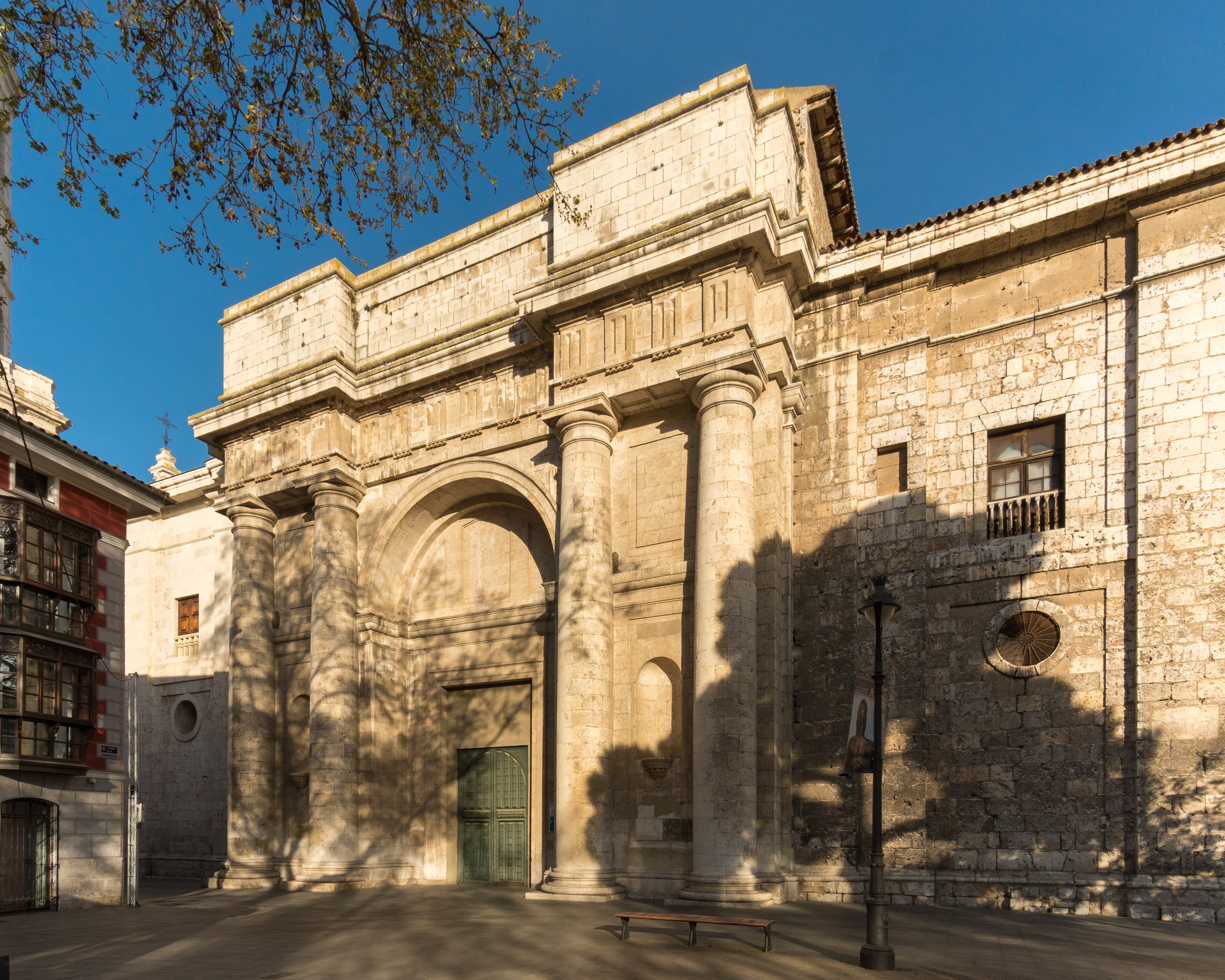
Transept end with the triumphal arch theme

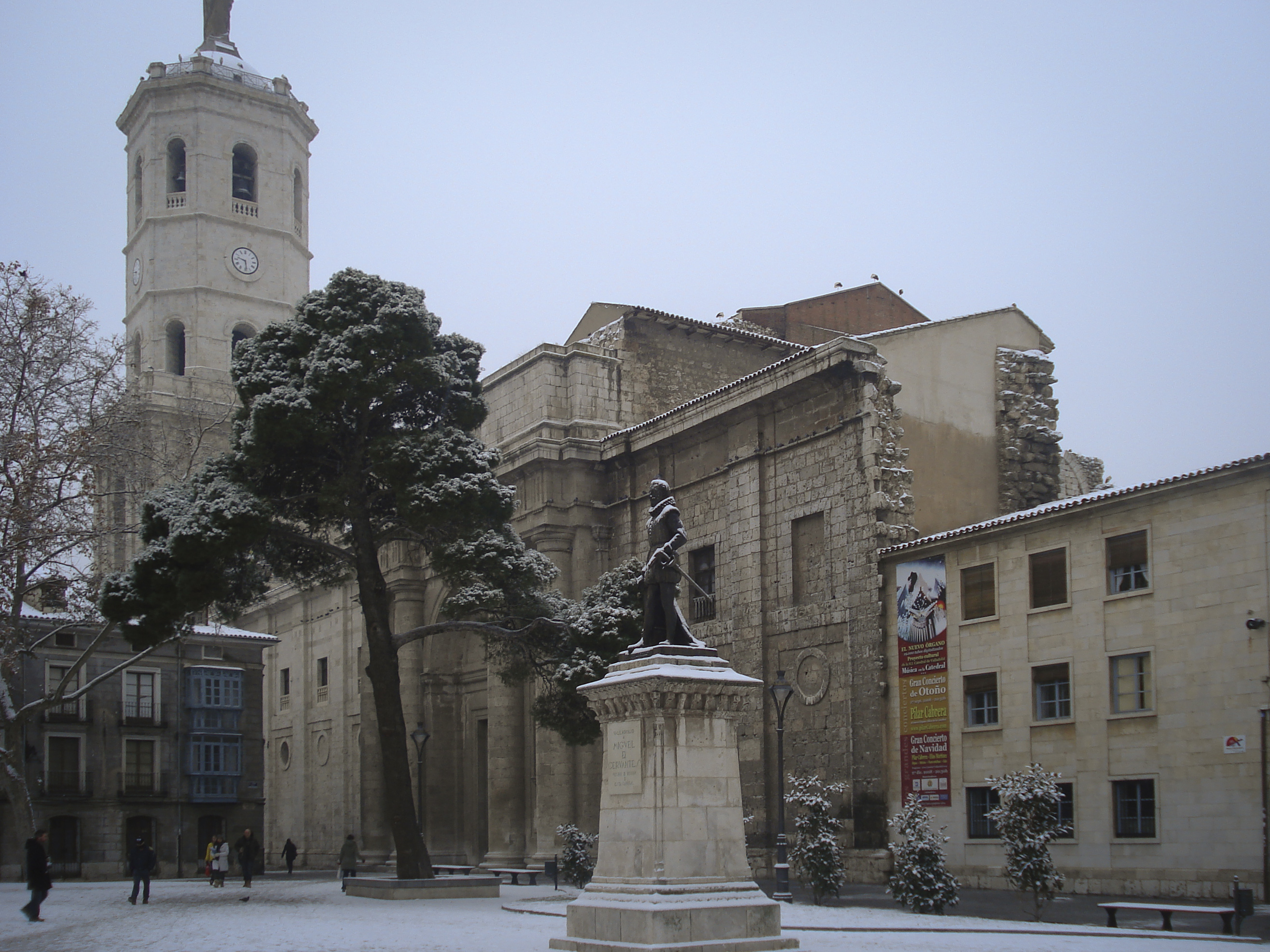
The unfinished cathedral and the Plaza de la Universidad, near University of Valladolid

The structure has its origins in a late Gothic collegiate church, which began in the late 15th century. Before temporarily becoming capital of a united Spain, Valladolid was not a bishopric, and thus it lacked a cathedral. However, with the newly established episcopal see in the 16th century, the Town Council decided to build a larger, modern cathedral in Renaissance-style, befitting the city's new status.

The cathedral that was planned would have been immense. When construction started, Valladolid was the de facto capital of Spain, home to King Philip II and his court. However, for strategic and geopolitical reasons, by the 1560s the capital was moved to Madrid and construction funds were severely trimmed. The cathedral was not finished according to Herrera's design, and it was further modified during the 17th and 18th centuries, for example with the addition of a work by Churriguera to the top of the principal façade.

== Description ==
The building, declared of Cultural Interest in 1931, is dedicated to Nuestra Señora de la Asunción. Although designed by Juan de Herrera, its construction was directed mainly by his disciples in the first half of the 17th century. Diego de Praves was the main contributor, and he was succeeded by his son. The design plan was a rectangle with two towers in the corners of the main façade, and another two finishing in pyramids, in the chancel.

The plan was a vast church with three aisles, with a transept in the centre, with two great doors in its ends. The main chapel and the choir were intended to be in the same place, facing the prayers (following the aims of the Council of Trent), so processions could pass round the back. Also, some chapels on the two sides of the building, placed between buttresses, were planned. Only a half of the church was built. Nowadays, the building stops at the transept. Only one tower now stands and it does not follow Herrera's plans.

The lower part of the main façade takes the form of a triumphal arch in the Doric order. Due to an error in construction the portal arch is rather pointed.

In the 18th century Alberto Churriguera erected the second part in imitation of the façade of the church of El Escorial. Capping the balustrade are statues of St. Ambrose, St. Augustine, St. Gregory and St. Jerome. Then the tower on the side of the vestry was erected which, after suffering damage from the Lisbon earthquake (1753), finally fell down in 1841; it was re-erected next to the vestry and is crowned with a statue of the Corazón de Jesús (Sacred Heart).

Today it contains a rich musical archive housing 6000 works, and a 16th-century altarpiece by Juan de Juni taken from the church of Santa María La Antigua, also in Valladolid, while the altarpiece by El Greco originally in the cathedral has been moved elsewhere.

There are four chapels on either side of the church. In the first there is a Neoclassical picture of Cain and Abel, and the second was gift of Juan Velerde. The third has two late 17th century large pictures, work of a follower of Lucas Jordan. The next is dedicated to San Fernando and the tomb of Count Ansúrez is close to it, whose statue dates from the 16th century.

The main chapel has the altarpiece made by Juan de Juni was transferred to its present position in 1922. The choir stalls were built by Francisco Velázquez and Melchor de Beya in 1617 and came from the convent of San Pablo, in Valladolid. On the other side of the church, on the third chapel there is a Baroque altarpiece of the 18th century and a group of statues and funerary reliefs of the Venero family, work of a disciple of Pompeo Leoni. The second chapel has a Baroque altarpiece, with a sculpture of San Pedro by Pedro de Ávila and a 16th-century screen.

The great pipe organ, over the main door, was built in 1904 by Aquilino Amezua and enlarged in 1933 by his former partner L. Galdós, using a classicist case from a previous organ built in 1794. It follows romantic taste and has three manuals and pedal, with 36 stops. There is also an Allen electronic-digital organ.

In the vestry there are several pictures: for example, an Assumption of the second quarter of the 17th century by Diego Valentín Díaz and a San Jerónimo y San Jenaro by Lucas Jordan.

== Gallery ==
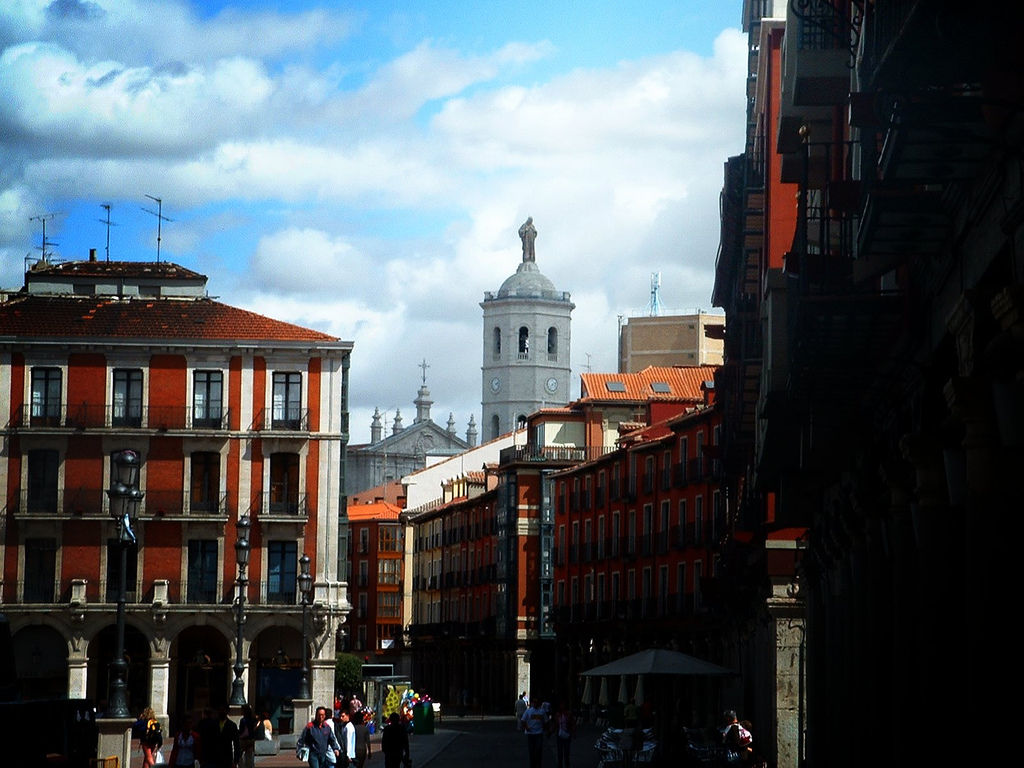
View from Plaza Mayor

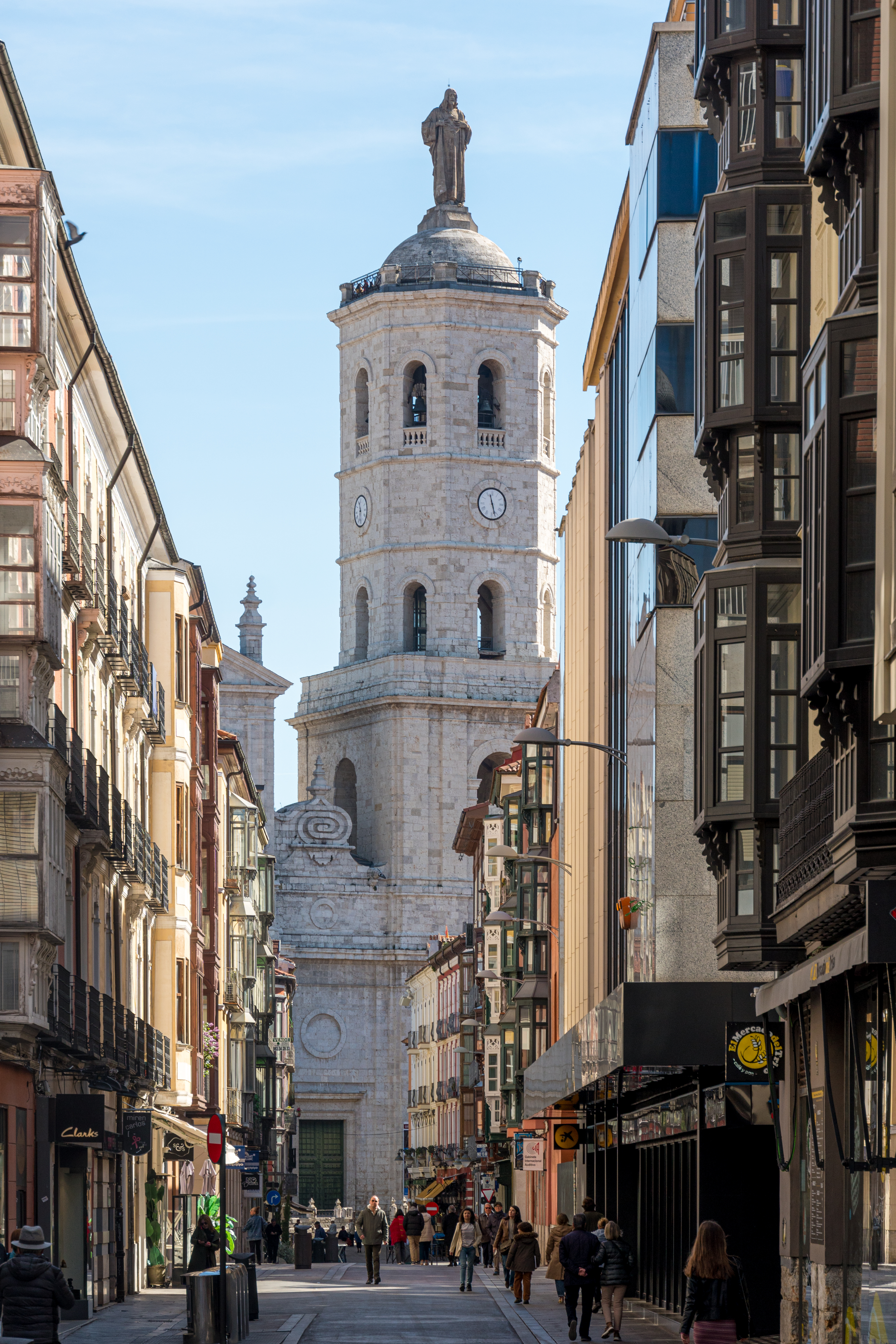
From Regalado Street

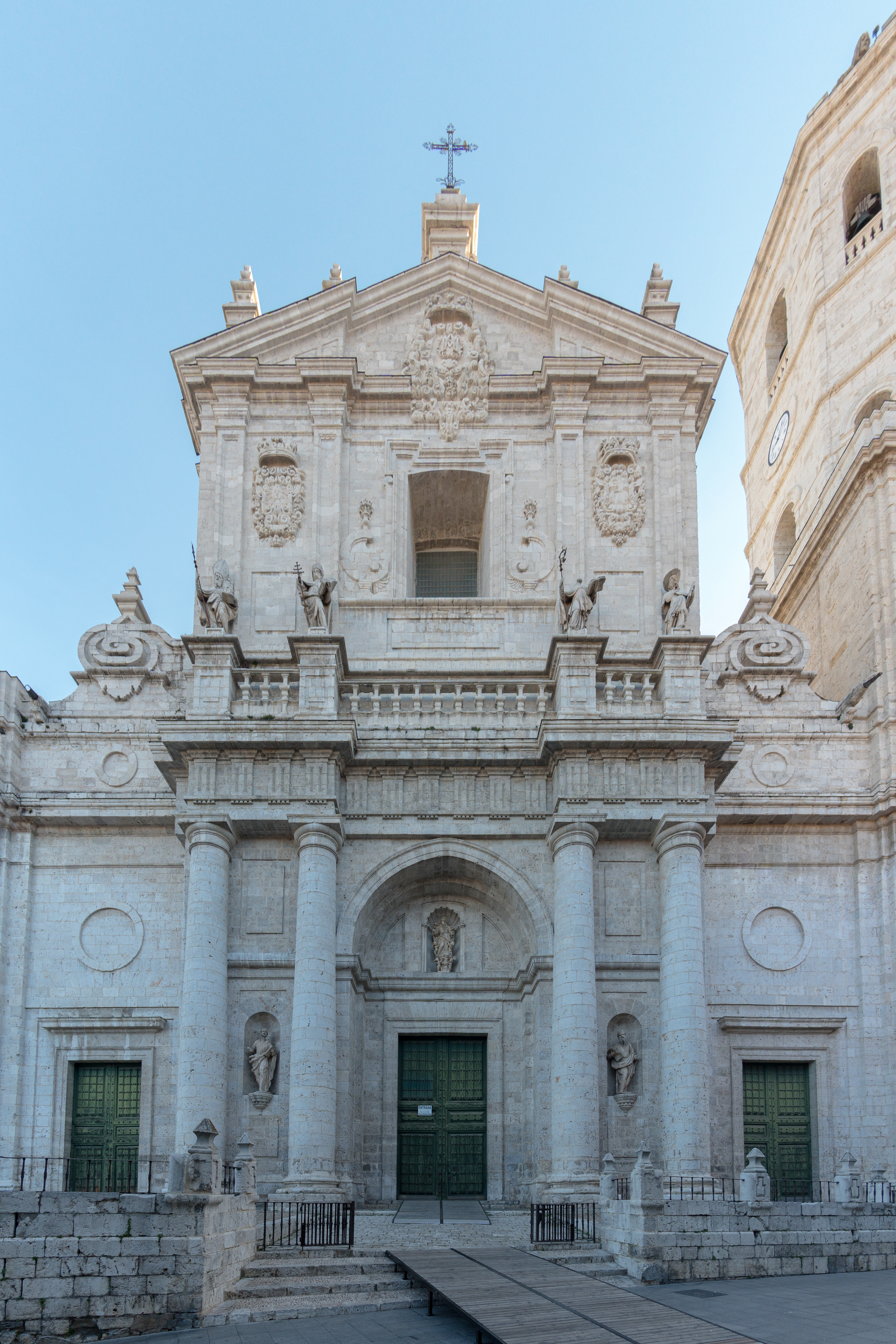
Main view

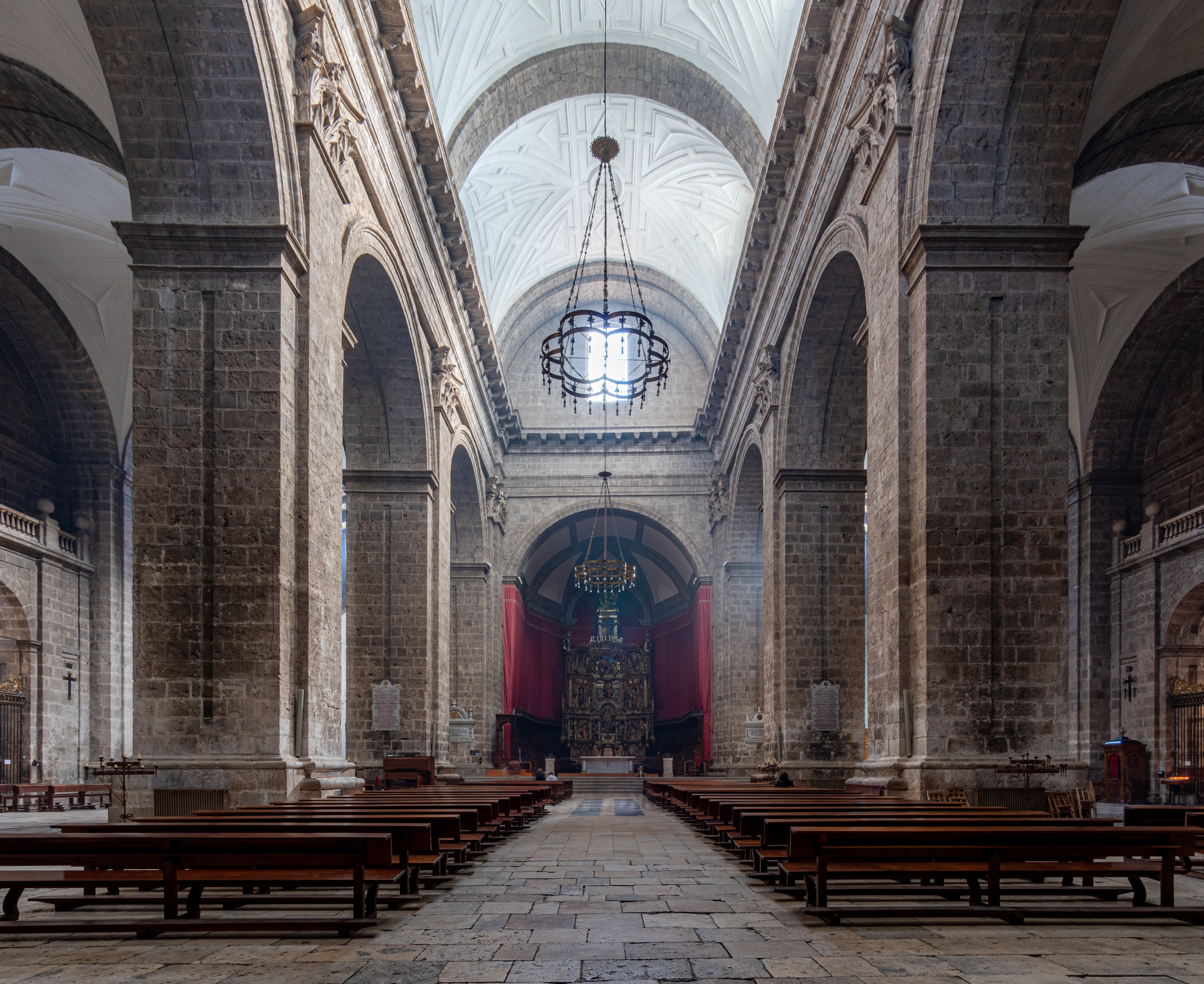
Interior

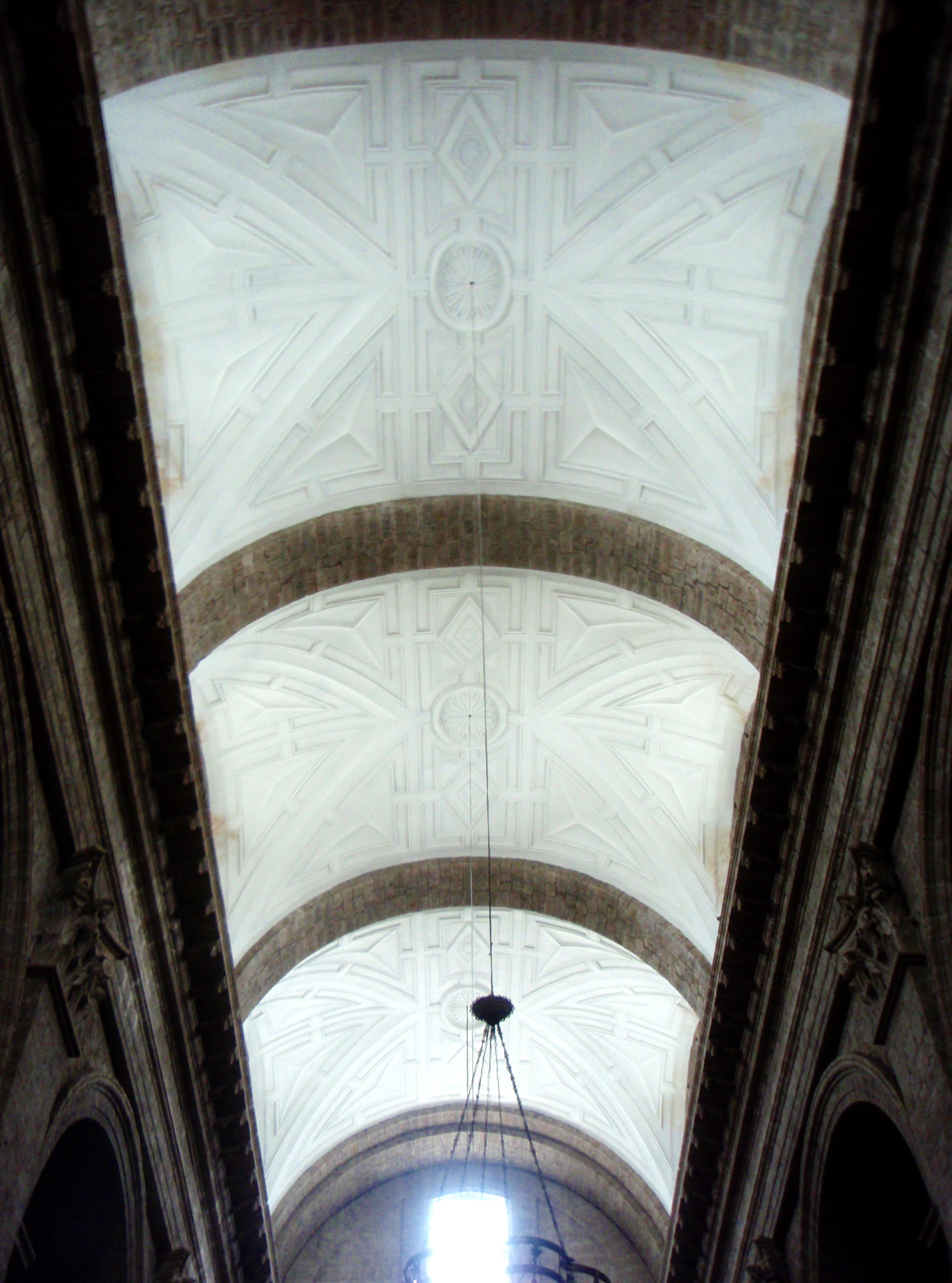
Roof

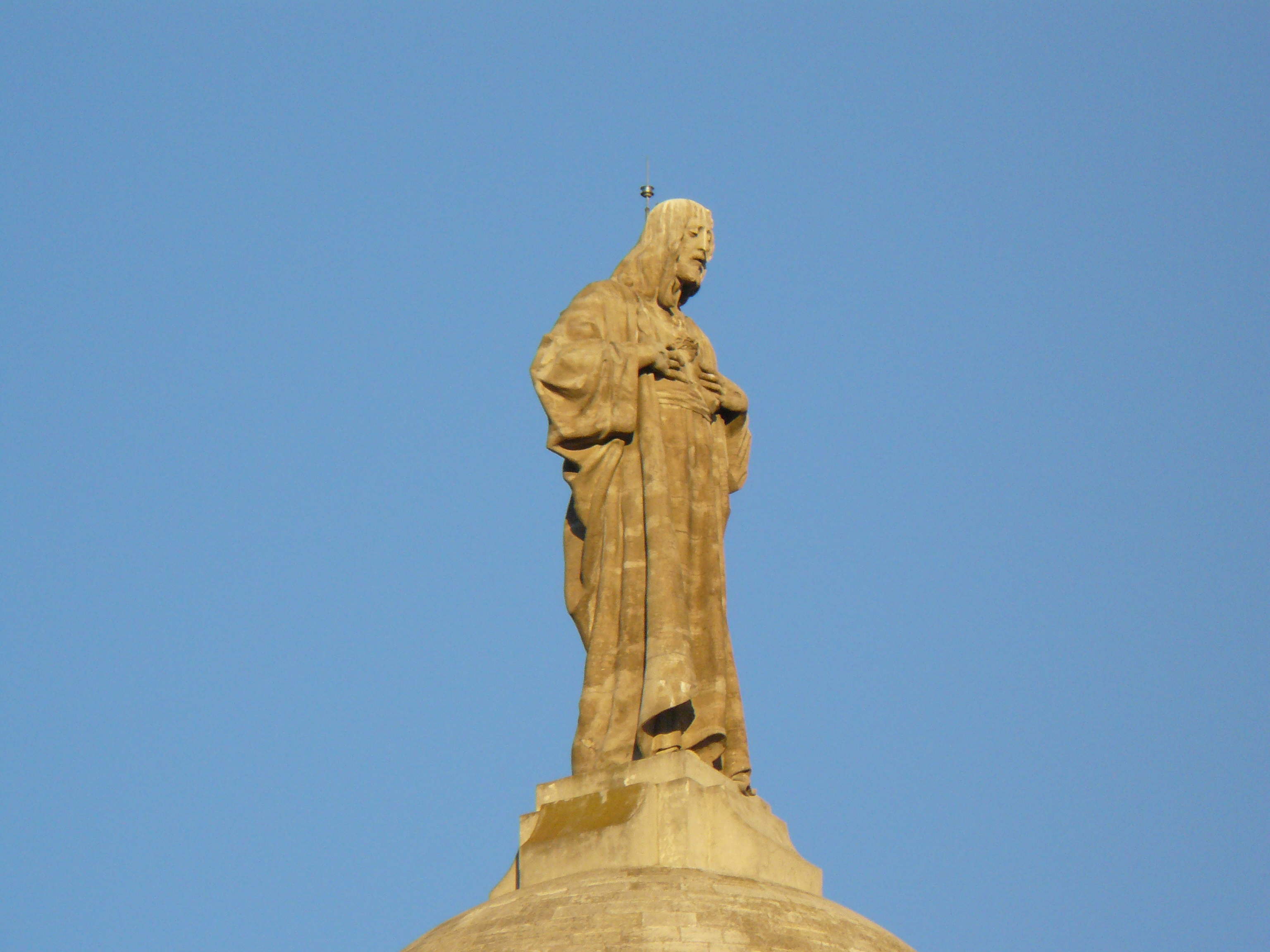
Statue of the Sacred Heart

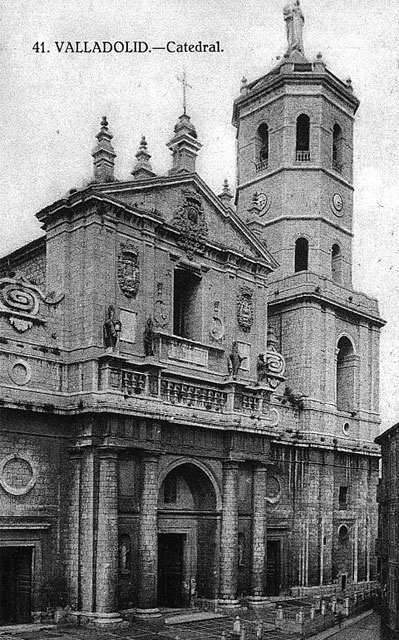
In 1920s

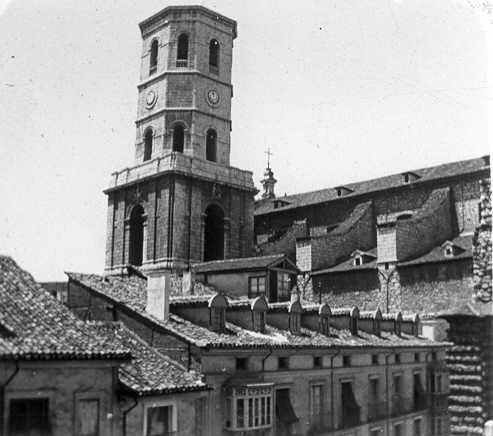

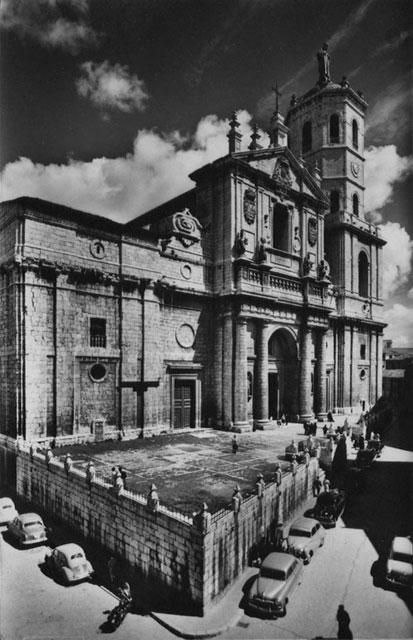
In 1960s

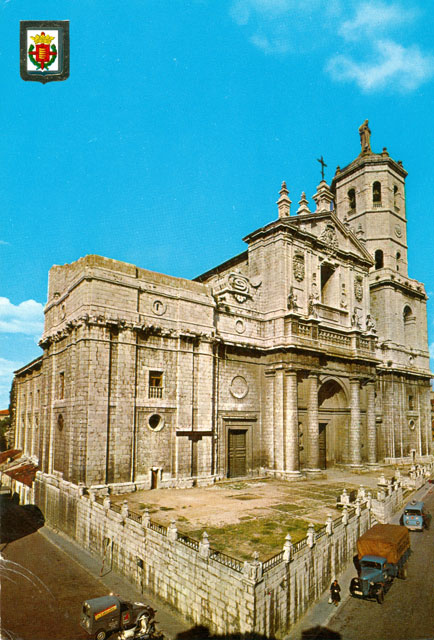
Also in 1960s

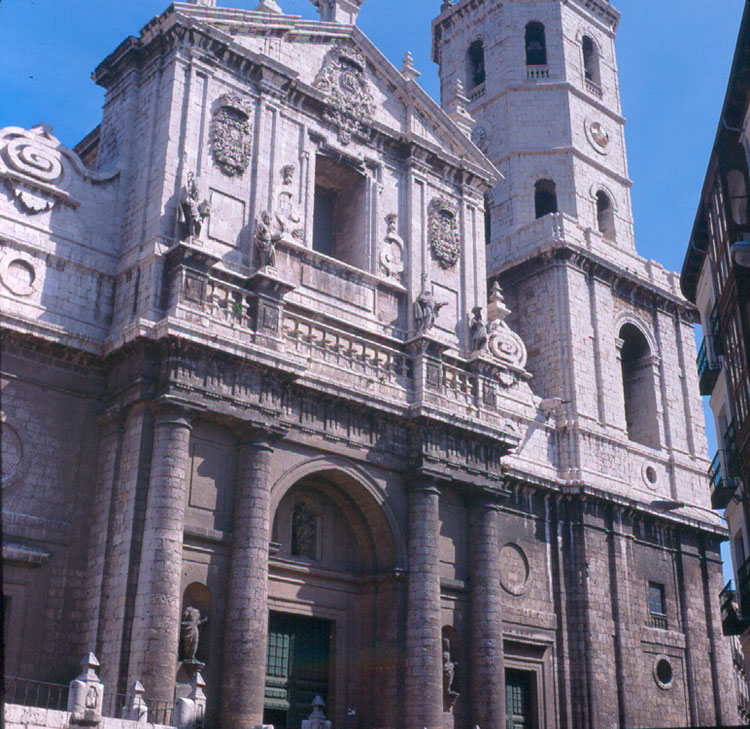
In 1990s

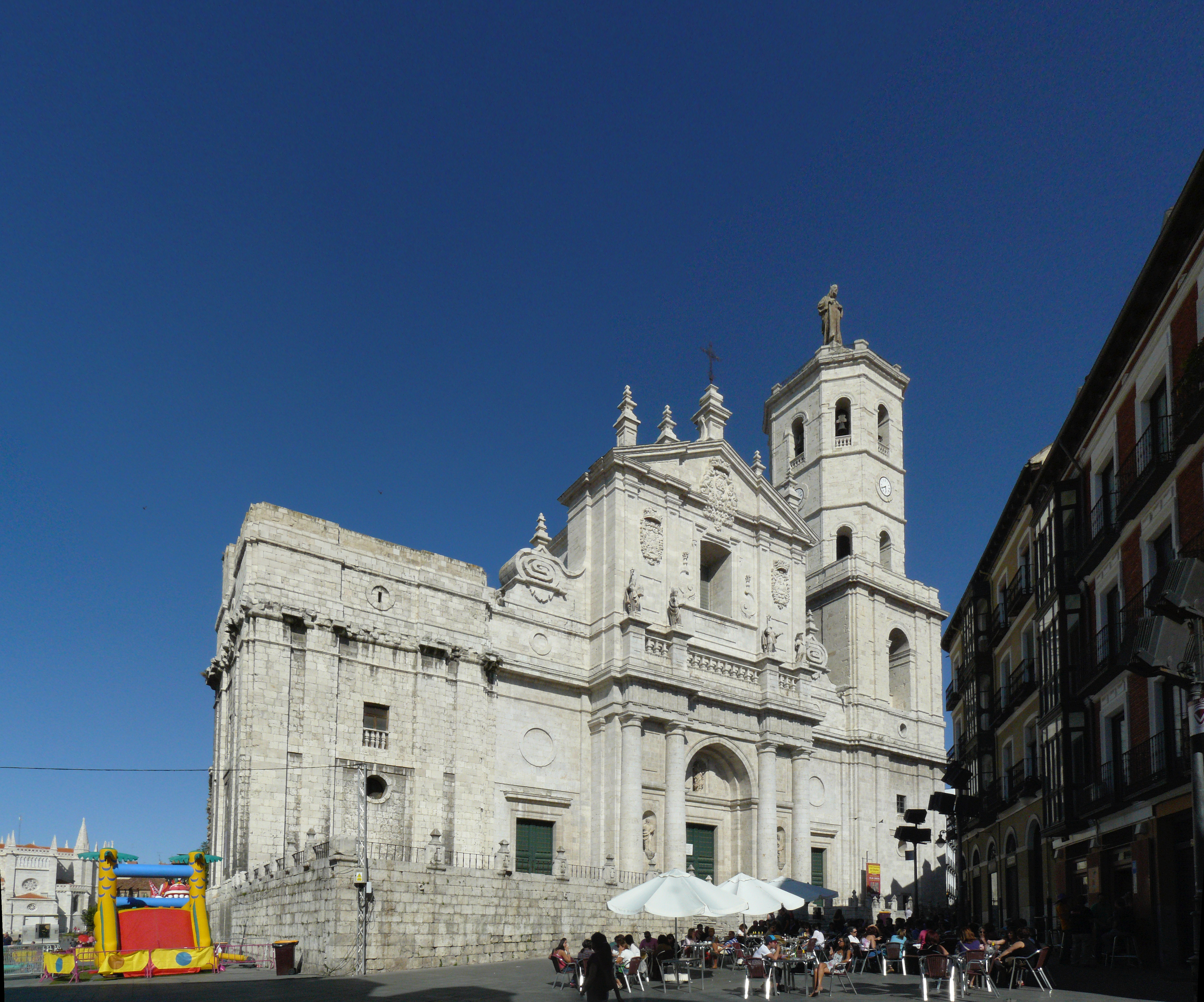
2012

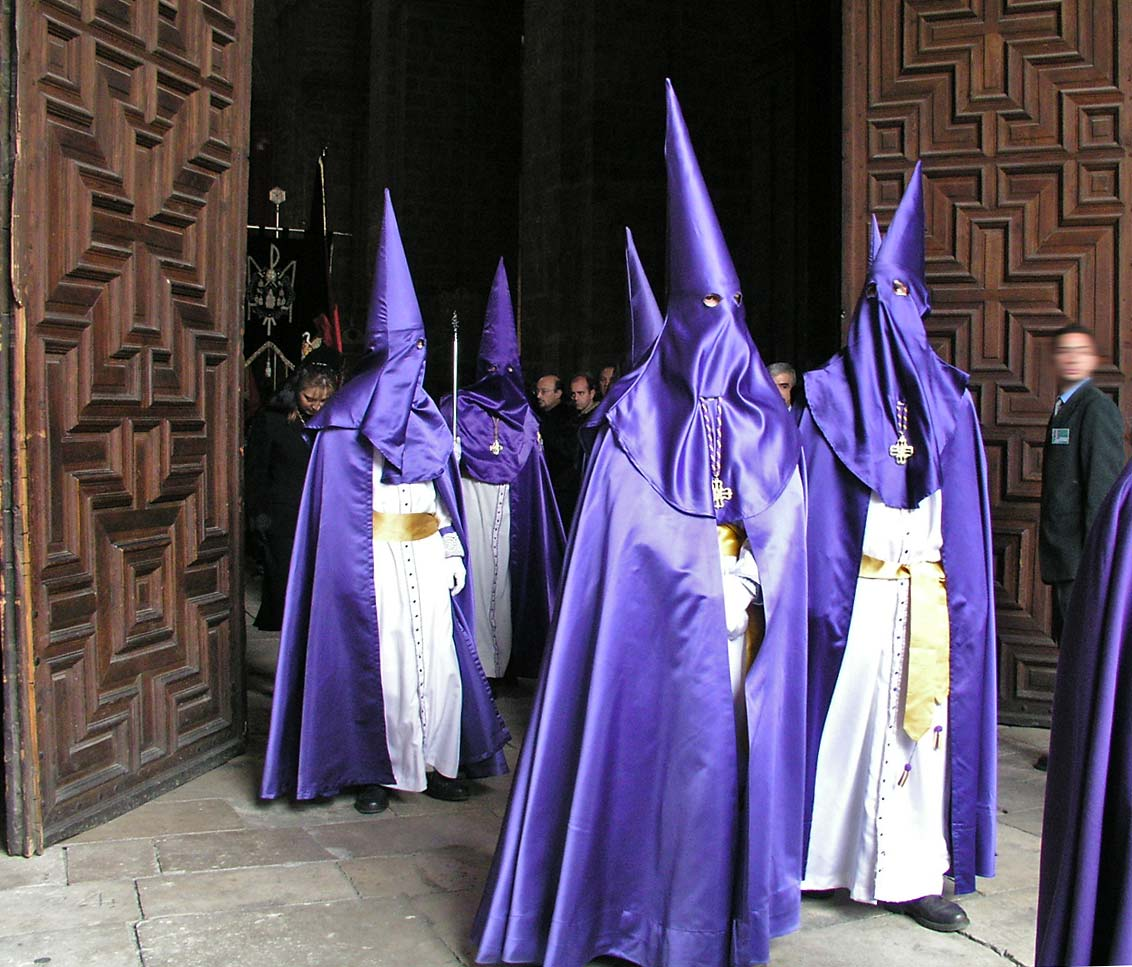
Members of brotherhoods during Holy Week in Valladolid

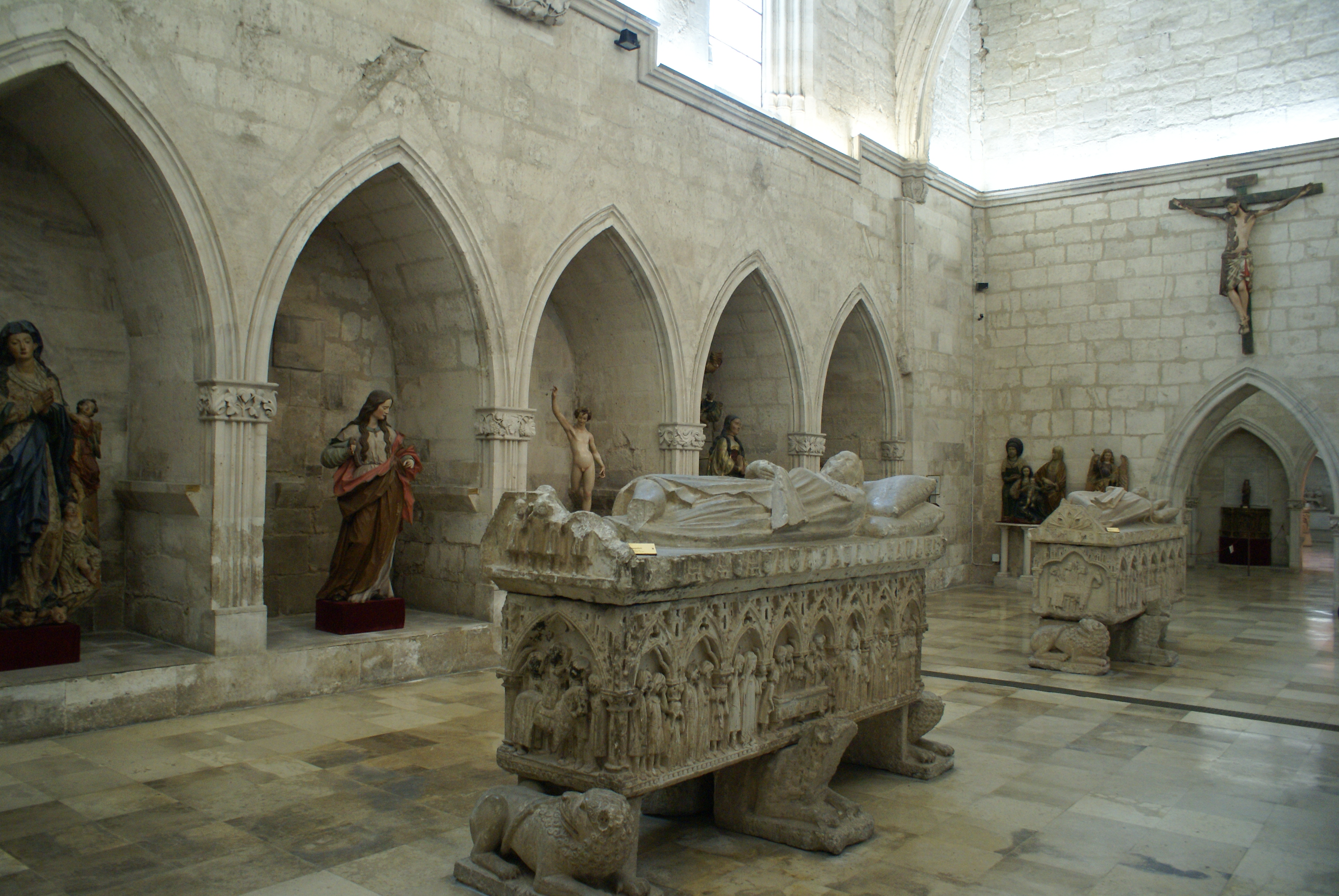
Inside the chapel, part of the Diocesan Museum and Cathedral of Valladolid
