= Bernward Monument =

- German: Bernwardsdenkmal
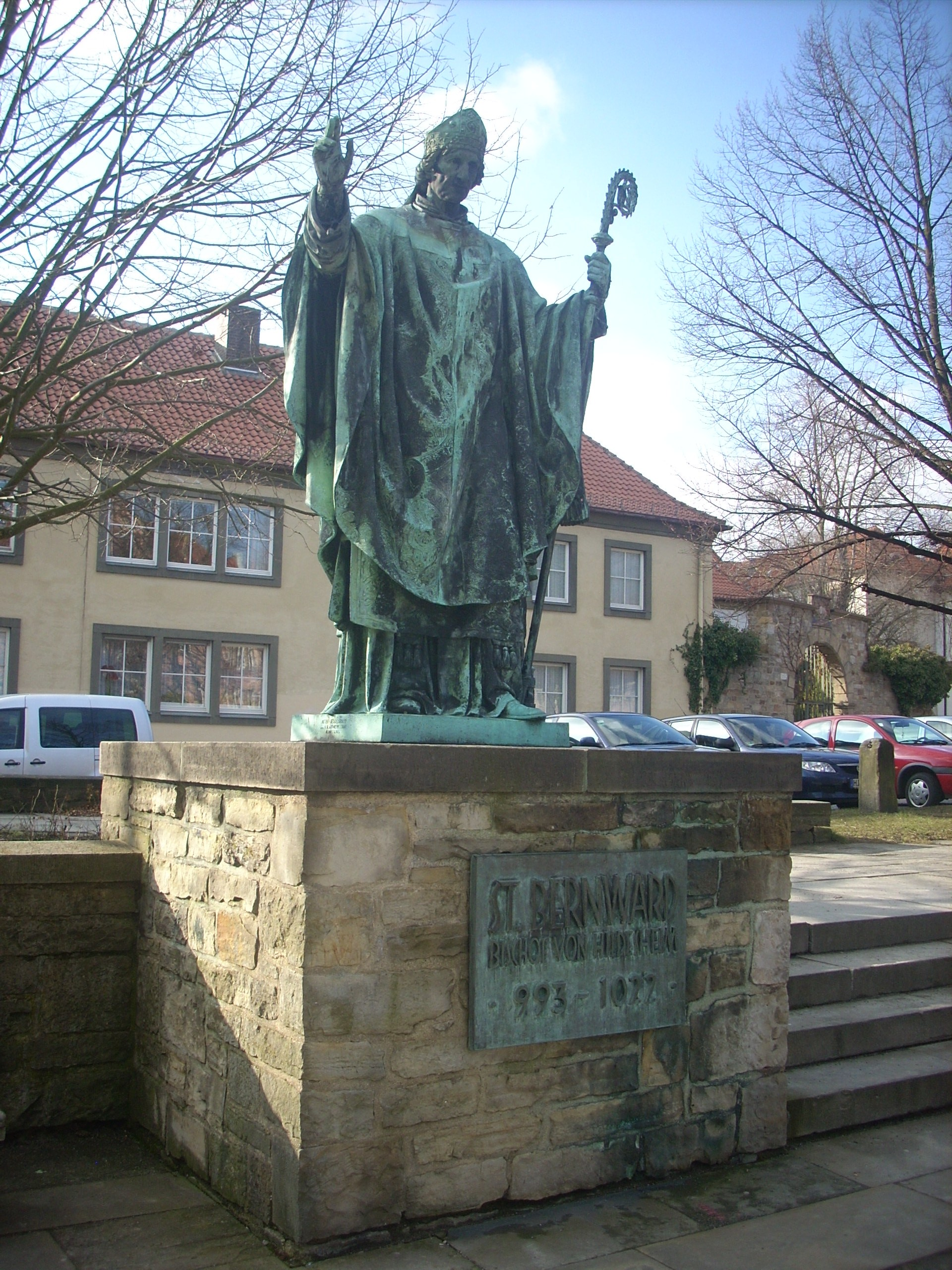
- The Bernward Monument (Location 1955–2011)
- Artist: Ferdinand Hartzer
- Year: 1893
- Medium: Bronze
- Subject: Bishop Bernward of Hildesheim
- Location: Hildesheim
- 52°8′56.764″N 9°56′46.802″E

The Bernward Monument (German: Bernwardsdenkmal) is a larger-than-life-sized bronze statue of Bishop Bernward of Hildesheim in the Domhof in Hildesheim. It was made by Ferdinand Hartzer in 1893 for the nine hundredth anniversary of St. Bernward's enthronement as Bishop of Hildesheim. On 7 September 2011, in the course of the renovations of Hildesheim Cathedral it was temporarily relocated to the garden of house 24, Domhof.

== The monument up to 2011 ==
The statue stood on a broad cubic base of roughly hewn stone blocks in the forecourt of the northwestern entrance to the cathedral. The statue was positioned so that it faced towards people approaching the cathedral from the east (i.e. from town), welcoming them before they entered the cathedral itself. Behind the statue, the ground-level is raised to the height of the base. Steps next to the monument allow the visitor to climb up to roughly the same level as the bishop.

The bronze statue, covered by a patina and weathered by wind and rain, depicts the saint in episcopal garb, with alb, stole, maniples, mitre and crosier. With these, the artist attempted to be historically accurate, roughly imitating the depictions of Bernward's chasuble preserved in the cathedral museum. However, the mitre and crosier, with the coronation of the Virgin depicted in the crook, are based on examples from a century or two after Bernward's death.

The Bishop stands upright, bending down slightly to look at the viewer. His right hand is raised in benediction, his left hand holds his coriser at about the same height. The chasuble drapes down from this point. The forward position of his left foot and the forward tilt of the crosier imbues the statue with forward momentum. This is emphasised from behind by his billowing cloak and hair. His narrow, serious, no longer youthful face seems to look over his people with in concern and care. At the point where the crosier touches the ground there is a model of St. Michael's Church, which Bernward founded and in which he was buried. It here serves as a symbol of the saint. The depiction of the church corresponds to its modern shape (which is basically the same as the original building), not to its appearance in the nineteenth century.

== Creation ==
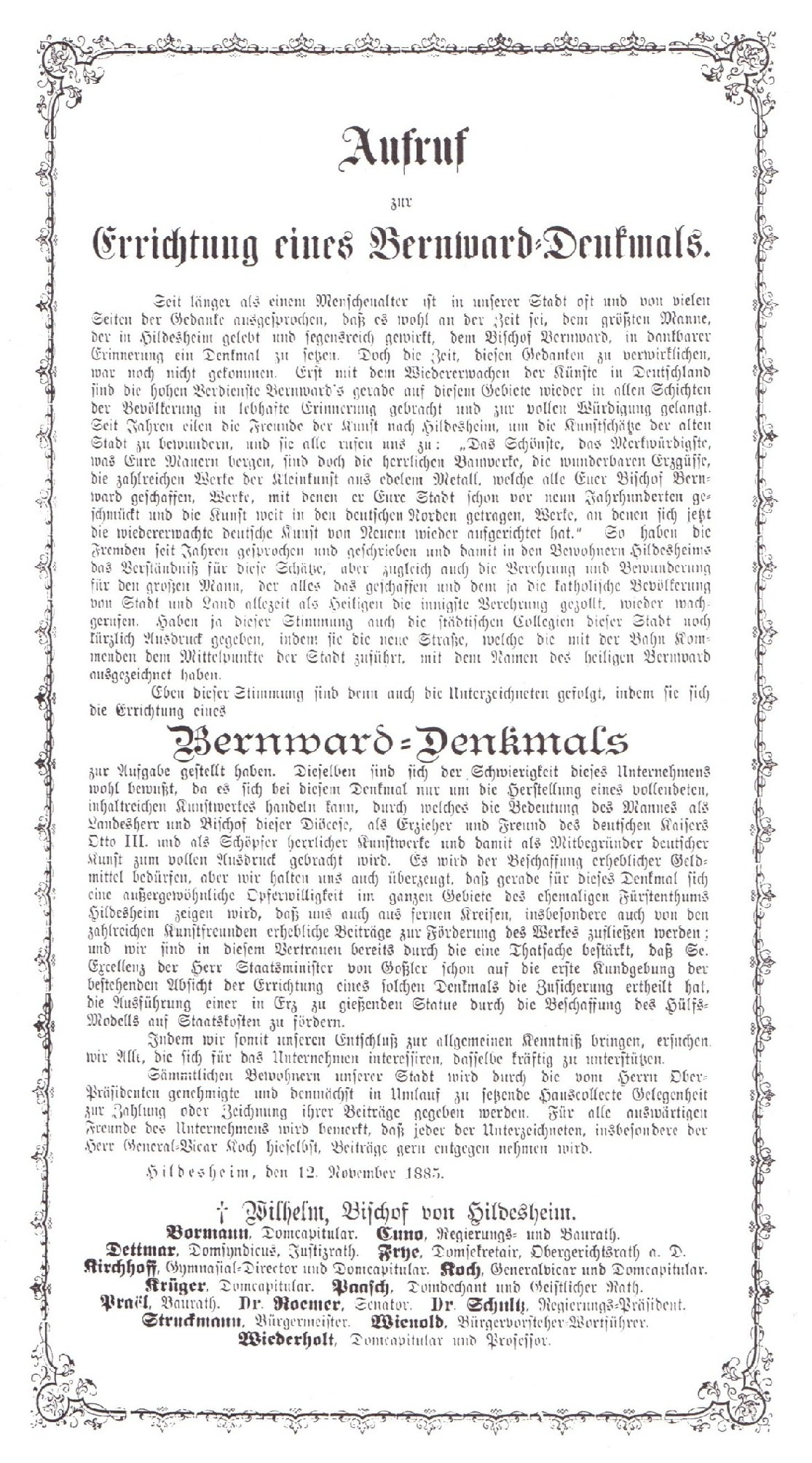
Bischop Sommerwerck's appeal, 1885

Even more than his predecessors, Daniel Wilhelm Sommerwerck, Bishop of Hildesheim 1871-1905 modelled himself on Bernward and put the saint ever more prominently before the eyes of his diocese. With Kulturkampf and the consolidation of the catholic church in the new German empire ongoing, Bernward's political deeds, especially his role as tutor and advisor to Emperor Otto III and Emperor Henry II gained great symbolic value. Already in the 1870s, therefore, there were plans for a monument. But it was only in 1885, in a pastoral letter on the subject of Bernward that Bishop Sommerwerck made an open appeal, seeking support for the planned monument. The appeal had a surprisingly enthusiastic reception. Even the Prussian government indicated its willingness to cooperate from the outset.

Out of eight submissions, that of C.F. Hartzer was selected. The substructure which he had envisioned was not accepted, however, and Hartzer immediately produced a new design, with the help of the architect Christoph Hehl, who was a close friend of his.

On 28 September 1893, the day before Michaelmas, Bishop Sommerwerck revealed the new monument to a great audience of diocesan clerics, government officials, and the people of Hildesheim in a festive ceremony, calling the saint:

| German | English |
|---|---|
| Vorbild der treuesten, opferfreudigsten Liebe zu unserem heißgeliebten Vaterland, zu Kaiser und Reich, zu der von Gott gesetzten Autorität und Ordnung | a model of the life of loyalty and self-sacrifice for our beloved fatherland, for Kaiser and Reich, for the authority and order established by God |

== Original location ==
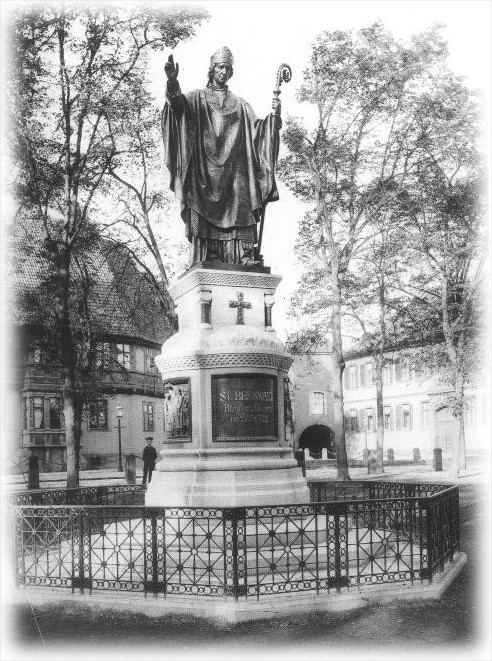
The Bernward monument in its original location

Originally the Bernward monument stood further north, roughly halfway between the cathedral and the bishop's house and looked down from the top of a podium which was more than three metres high towards the Großen Domhof to the north. This was the same location in which the Bernward Column stood until it was moved inside the cathedral for conservation reasons in 1893.

The pedestal, made from light grey granite had neoromanesque architectural decorations and was divided into several different levels of decreasing size. On the rounded central level there were four bronze reliefs: the front one bearing Bernward's name and dates, the other three showing key scenes from his life, which showed him as a teacher, a church leader, and an artist - indicating the contemporary meaning of the monument. Immediately below the statue itself was a copy of the Cross of Bernward, which explains why this symbol is absent from the statue itself.

The bronze reliefs were taken and melted down for war purposes in 1943. The statue itself was put in storage and escaped the destruction of Hildesheim. After the war, the cathedral chapter decided that the tall podium was no longer appropriate and it was removed in 1966.

== The reliefs ==
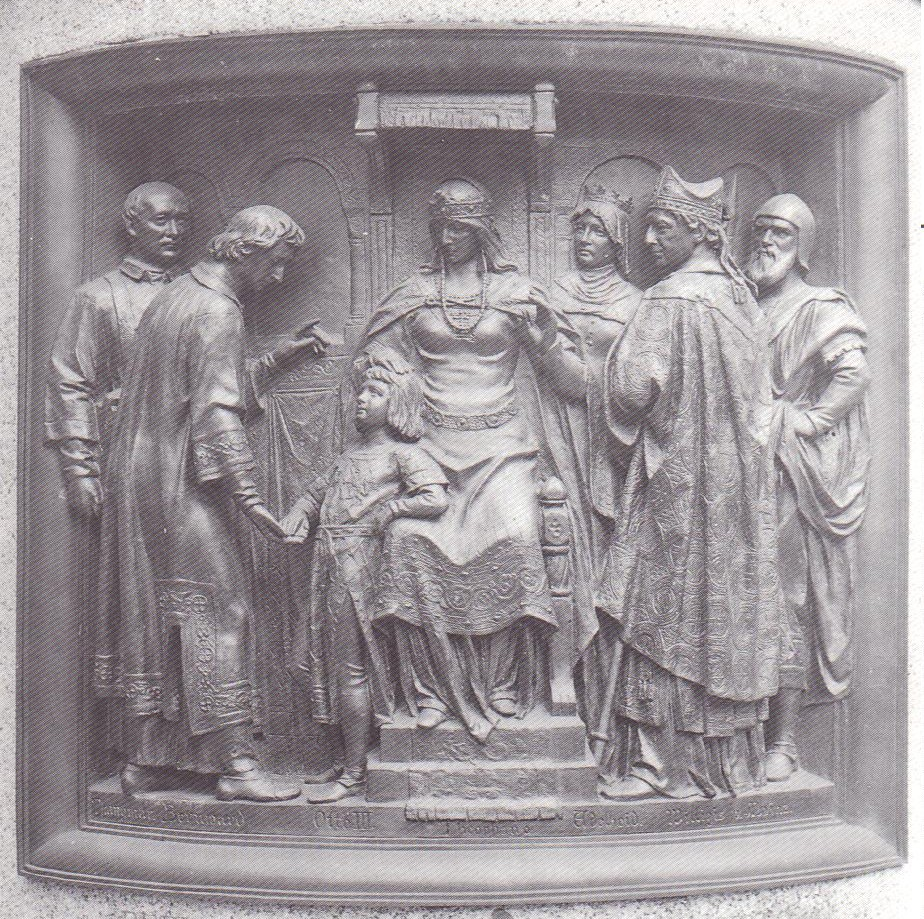
Bernward undertakes the education of Otto III. (in the presence of Theophanu)

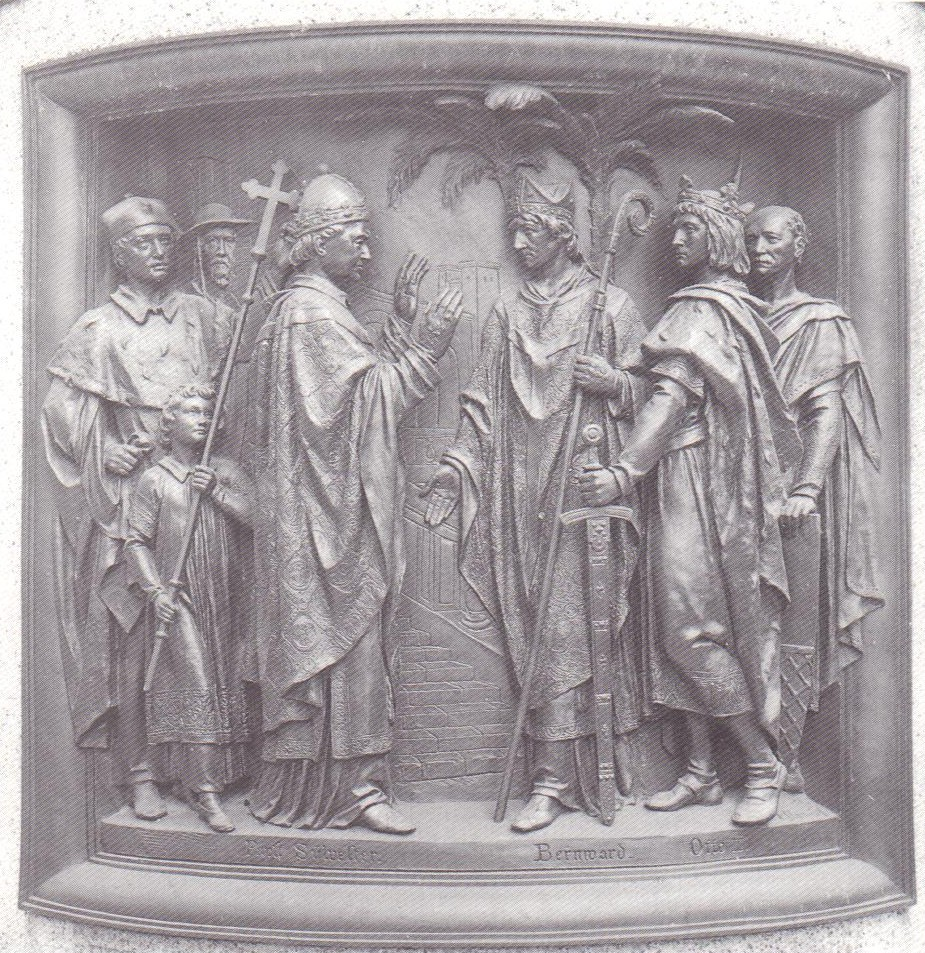
Bernward welcomed to Rome by Sylvester II (Otto III at his side)

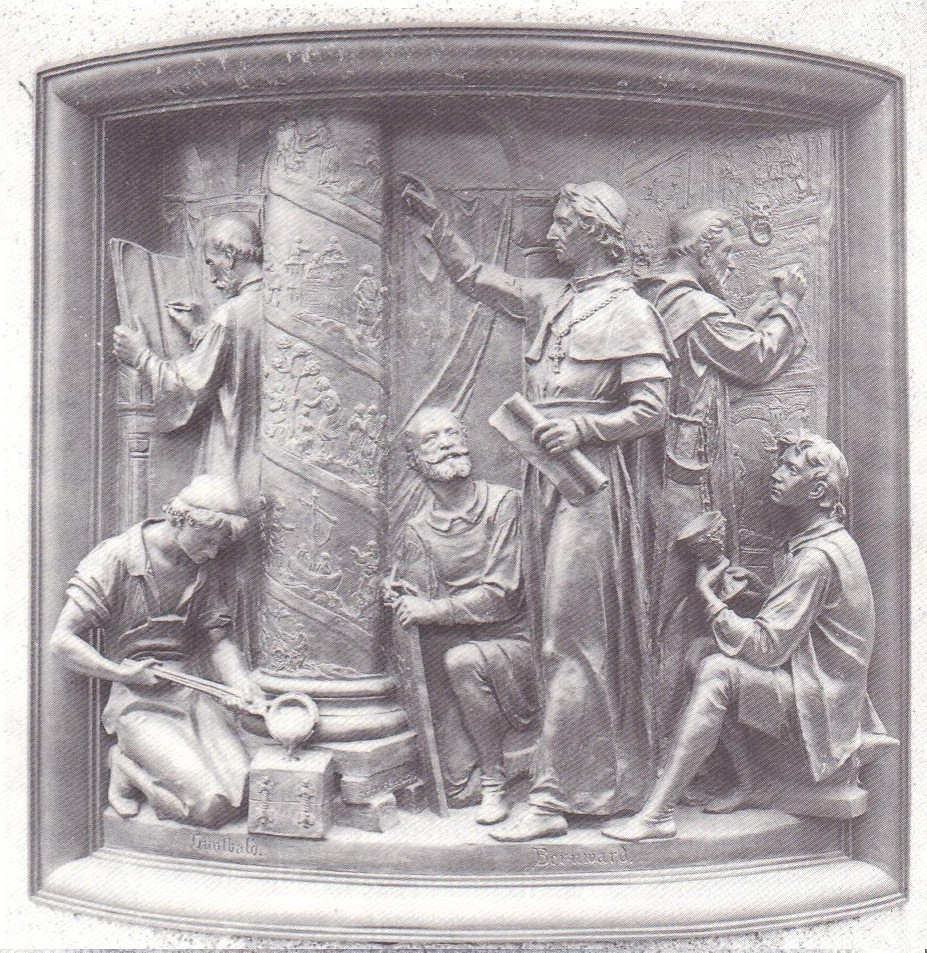
Bernward in his workshop (in the centre, the Bernward Column under construction)

== Bibliography ==
- Monika & Karl Arndt. "Das Bernward-Denkmal in Hildesheim," in Bernward von Hildesheim und das Zeitalter der Ottonen, Vol. I, Hildesheim 1993, pp. 449–457
- Manfred Overesch. "Das Bernward-Denkmal von 1893 als politische Antwort der katholischen Kirche auf den Kulturkampf Bismarcks," Die Diözese Hildesheim, 61st annual, Hildesheim 1993, pp. 103–105
- Thomas Scharf-Wrede. Zur Bedeutung und Verehrung des hl. Bernward im Bistum Hildesheim im 19. und 20. Jahrhundert, Hildesheim, pp. 107–116
