= Rich Bernward Gospels =

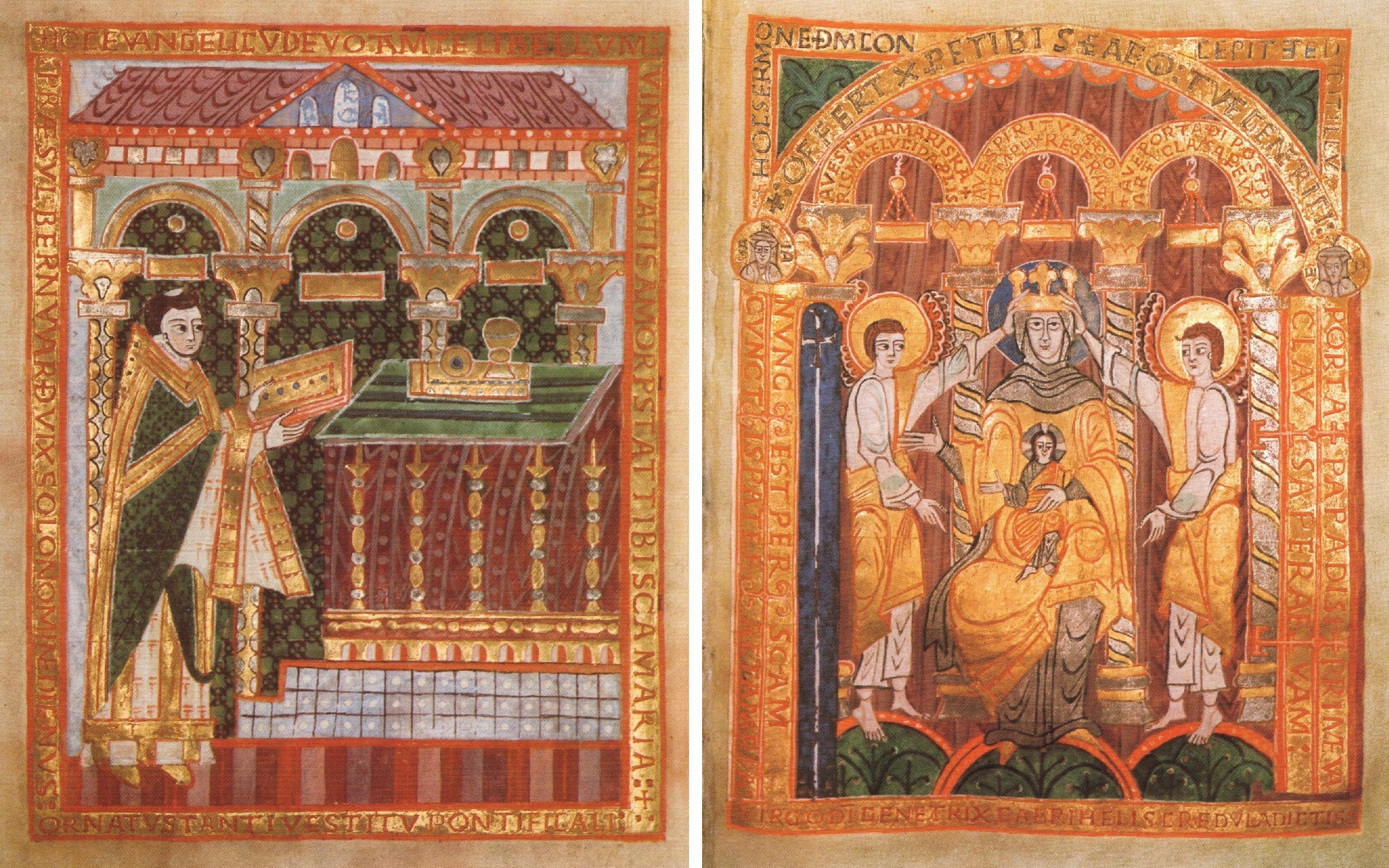
Bernward Gospels, dedication page

The Rich Bernward Gospels (German: Kostbares Bernwardevangeliar) are a richly decorated evangeliary in the Hildesheim Cathedral Museum. It was a donation of Bernward, Bishop of Hildesheim, to his foundation St. Michael's, specifically for the altar to Mary in the crypt below the west choir, which was consecrated in 1015 and which he had designated as his tomb.

== Contents and decoration ==
The gospels consist of 232 parchment leaves of 28 x 20 cm and a cover made from two oak blocks, which is decorated with images, silver mountings and gems. It contains the Vulgate text of the four gospels with various prefaces and a pericope.

The gospels particularly deserve the sobriquet "Rich" (kostbar) on account of their binding, which was already intricate when Bernward had it produced and received further decoration at the time of his canonisation in the twelfth century. In the centre of the front cover there is a Byzantine ivory icon with a relief depicting Christ between Mary and John the Baptist, who are interceding on behalf of the souls of the world (see deesis). The humble prayers around this image mention Bernward by name, as do those on the back cover, which depicts Mary holding the baby Jesus.

Among the illumination inside the book, the two-page dedication image stands out. Within an architectural space with many arches there is an altar decked out for the eucharist at left. Bernward stands next to it in his liturgical vestments, offering the gospels to the Mother of God. She sits at the right hand side, facing the viewer, and is being crowned as Nikopoia by angels, while she holds her son, depicted as a small adult, in her lap. The caption describes the actions with pious and humble words and mentions Bernward by name.

Each gospel contains three or four illuminated images. The last of these in each gospel shows the symbol of the evangelist, while the others dwell on the themes of the salvation history which were assigned to the evangelists by church scholars (Gregory the Great, Alcuin etc.): the incarnation (Matthew), resurrection (Mark), death as redeeming sacrifice (Luke) and ascension (John). In addition, the initials are richly decorated.

== Bibliography ==
- Michael Brandt / Ulrich Kuder. "Sog. Kostbares Evangeliar," in Bernward von Hildesheim und das Zeitalter der Ottonen, Vol. 2, Hildesheim 1993, pp. 570–578
- Bernhard Bruns. "Das Epiphaniebild im Kostbaren Evangeliar des hl. Bernward," Die Diözese Hildesheim in Vergangenheit und Gegenwart 61 (1993) 11–19.
- Bernhard Bruns. "Das Widmungsbild im Kostbaren Evangeliar des hl. Bernward," Die Diözese Hildesheim in Vergangenheit und Gegenwart 65 (1997) 29–55.
