= Ratmann Sacramentary =

1159 illuminated liturgical manuscript

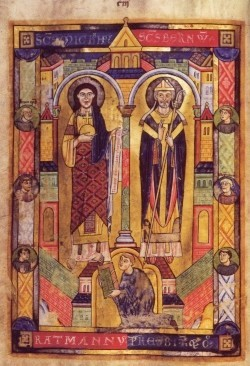
Ratmann Sakramentary, donor miniature: Ratmann offers the sacramentary up to the Archangel Michael and Bernward of Hildesheim

The Ratmann Sacramentary is an illuminated liturgical manuscript, which was produced in 1159 by a monk-priest named Ratmann and given to the cloister of St. Michael's in Hildesheim for the high altar.

Ratmann is probably the same as the Ratmann who appears in a deed of 1178 as the abbot of the cloister. The sacramentary is richly decorated, including a miniature, which shows Bishop Bernward of Hildesheim, the founder of the cloister, receiving the sacramentary from Ratmann, alongside the Archangel Michael (the patron of the cloister). Bernward was not canonised until well after the production of the sacramentary, but a provincial synod in Erfurt had permitted local veneration of him in 1150.

Around 1400 someone erased the original text and rewrote it. The high romanesque miniatures and illuminated initials from the twelfth century were retained, however. Such a reinscription of a manuscript, maintaining the contents and its liturgical function is extremely unusual. The manuscript is now kept in the Hildesheim Cathedral Museum.

The Stammheim Missal is a sister manuscript.

== Bibliography ==
- Anne Karen Menke. The Ratmann sacramentary and the Stammheim missal. Two romanesque manuscripts from St. Michael's at Hildesheim. Dissertation, Yale University 1987
- (in German) Ulrich Knapp (Ed.). Buch und Bild im Mittelalter. Gerstenberg, Hildesheim 1999, ISBN 3-8067-8583-X, pp. 74–78.
- (in German) Marlis Stähli. Die Handschriften im Domschatz zu Hildesheim : Beschreibungen. Harrassowitz, Wiesbaden 1984, ISBN 3-447-02471-2, pp. 117–123; 124–145 .(Illustrations) (Online) .
- (in Polish) Patricia Engel. Strategia podejmowania decyzji konserwatorskich w procesie identyfikacji i konserwacji historycznych śladów uauwania pisma (tekstu) w rękopisach (I–XV wiek) – Na przykładzie konserwacji – restauracji „Ratmann Sakramentary“ z kolekcji Skarbów Hildesheim. Dissertation, Warsaw 2007 (unpublished).
