= Cross of Bernward =

Two Ottonian crosses in Hildesheim, Germany

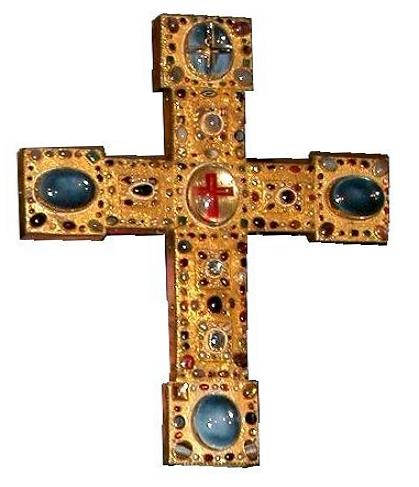
The Great Cross of Bernward

The term Cross of Bernward (German: Bernwardskreuz) principally refers to two Ottonian crosses in the cathedral museum in Hildesheim:

The Great Cross of Bernward is a 48 cm (19 in) high processional Latin cross. The arms of the cross end in protruding rectangles. It was cast in gold and decorated richly with gemstones, pearls and crystals.
The Cross is named after Bernward, Bishop of Hildesheim (993–1022). Legend has it that he received relics of the True Cross from Otto III as a gift and therefore had an expensive reliquary made in the cathedral workshop. At most however this reliquary can only be a predecessor or early form of the current Cross of Bernward, which in its current form probably dates to 1130/40. In iconography the cross is one of Bernward's holy attributes. The Cross served as an ostensorium for pieces of the True Cross, which are the most precious of all the relics venerated at Hildesheim; they are displayed in the shape of a cross underneath the large rock crystal at the centre of the cross. It was originally placed on the cross altar at the eastern end of the nave of St. Michael. Behind it stood the Bernward Column, in front of a bronze-studded column whose base of Greek marble is now in St. Magdalen's.
Since the fourteenth century, the cross is known to have been the official symbol of the cloister of St. Michael. After the abolition of the cloister it was transferred to St. Magdalen's and then to the Cathedral treasury in the twentieth century.

Smaller, but of no less significance (especially in the history of medieval plastic arts) is the Little or Silver Cross of Bernward, which was probably made in a Bernwardian workshop. It is "in formal and technical terms, the culmination of all earlier cast crucifixes." Inscriptions on its reverse leave no doubt that the crucifix—stylistically related to the Berwardian Ringelheim Cross and the Gero Cross in Cologne—served as a reliquary.

== Bibliography ==
- Bernhard Gallistl. Der Dom zu Hildesheim und sein Weltkulturerbe, Bernwardstür und Christussäule, Hildesheim, 2000.
- Bernhard Gallistl. "Bischof Bernwards Stiftung St. Michael in Hildesheim: Liturgie und Legende", concilium medii aevi 14 (2011): 239–287 (Digital version)
- Ernst Günther Grimme. Goldschmiedekunst im Mittelalter. Köln 1972.
- Victor H. Elbern. Dom und Domschatz in Hildesheim. Königstein, 1979.
- Martina Pippal. "Vortragekreuz, sog. Bernwardkreuz", in Bernward von Hildesheim und das Zeitalter der Ottonen Vol. 2. Hildesheim, 1993.
- Brockhaus' Konversationslexikon, Autorenkollektiv. F. A. Brockhaus in Leipzig, Berlin und Wien, 14th edition, 1894–1896.
