= The Risen Christ in Glory =

c. 1530 painting by Rosso Fiorentino

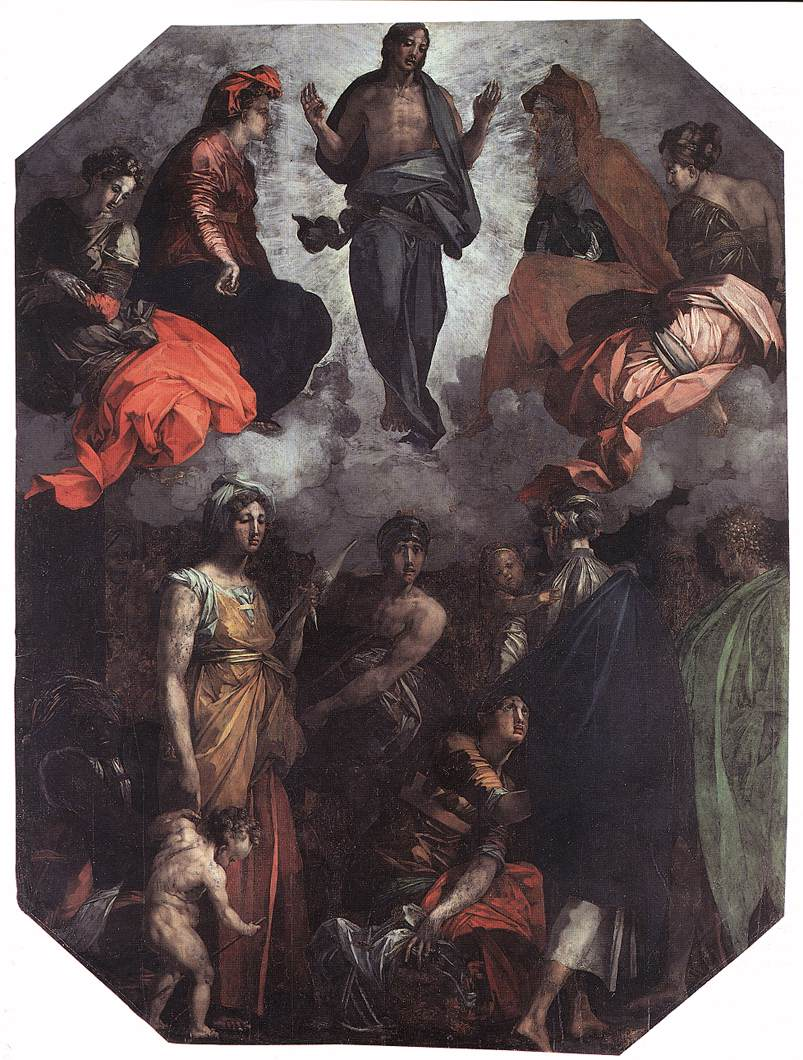
- Artist: Rosso Fiorentino
- Year: c. 1528-1530
- Medium: oil on panel
- Dimensions: 348 by 258 centimetres (137 in × 102 in)
- Location: Diocesan Museum, Città di Castello

The Risen Christ in Glory is an oil on panel painting by Rosso Fiorentino, created c. 1528-1530. OIt is held in the Diocesan Museum in the Città di Castello. It shows the risen Christ with (from left to right) Mary Magdalene, the Virgin Mary, Saint Anne and Mary of Egypt.

== History ==
Rosso signed the contract for the work on 1 July 1528 in Città di Castello. It had been commissioned by the local Company of the Corpus Domini. The contract stipulated the subject as the risen Christ in glory with four saints, all above "many and diverse figures which signify, represent the people, with as many angels as he [the painter] can accommodate".
