= Hildesheim Cathedral Museum =

Treasury and diocesan museum of Hildesheim

Coordinates: 52°08′57″N 9°56′51″E

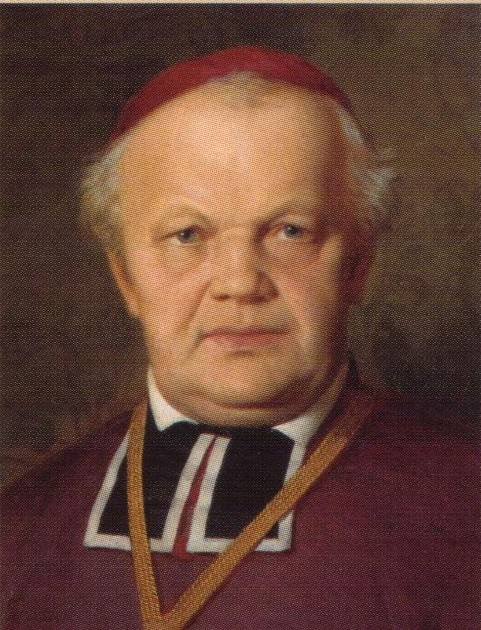
Bishop Eduard Jakob Wedekin donated his extensive art collection to the museum.

Hildesheim Cathedral Museum

The Hildesheim Cathedral Museum (German: Dommuseum Hildesheim) is the treasury and diocesan museum of Hildesheim, which illustrates over a thousand years of art and church history in Lower Saxony. It is located in historic rooms off the southern transept of the Hildesheim Cathedral. During the cathedral renovations of 2010, the nearby church of St Antonius and part of the cathedral cloisters were converted into display rooms for the museum.

The Hildesheim cathedral treasury is a collection of liturgical vessels, vestments, reliquaries, books and artworks of the highest quality, which has developed over the centuries. The Hildesheim Reliquary of Mary dates back to the beginning of the diocese and is connected to the cathedral's foundation story. Especially valuable pieces, including the gem-studded Cross of Bernward, the Bernward gospels, and the Ringelheim cross, were created during the prosperity of the diocese under Bishop Bernward († 1022), while the Ratmann Sacramentary was created in 1159 in connection with the beginning of his veneration as a saint. A bust reliquary and an arm reliquary of St Bernward date from the thirteenth century. From the baroque period comes magnificent monstrances and other gold and silver artworks. Many of these treasures are used to this day on important occasions in the cathedral calendar.

The Gobelins Artemisia came into the possession of the cathedral in 1727. It is being restored until 2015 and will have its own room in the reopened museum.

The efforts of Bishop Eduard Jakob Wedekin (1796–1870) converted the cathedral museum into a diocesan museum, containing religious artworks of the whole diocese and beyond. In particular he brought Gothic works from the parishes and his private collection into the cathedral treasury and organised their proper storage and display.

== Gallery ==
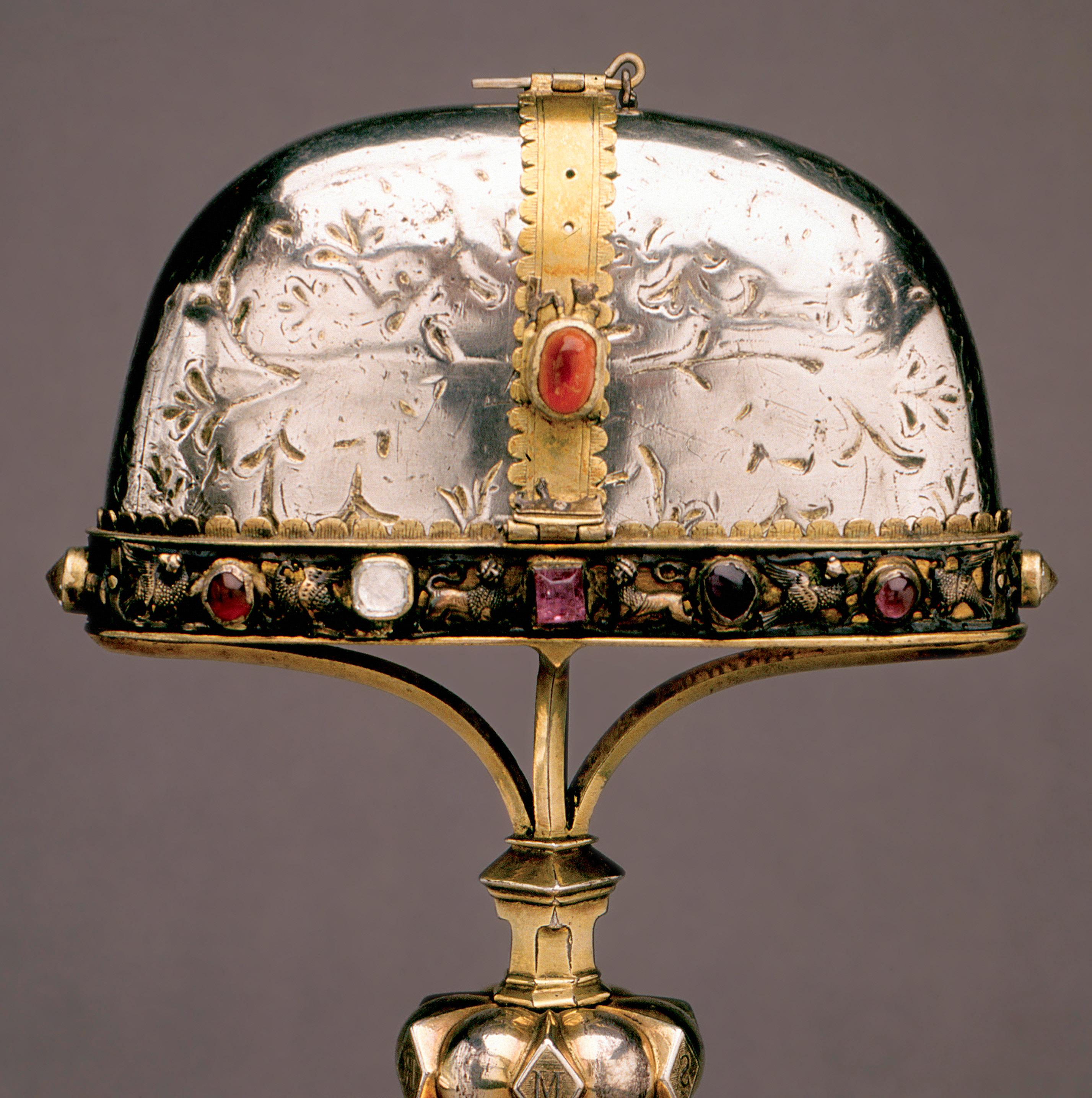
The Reliquary of Mary has a special position in the diocese's history dure to its age and significance.

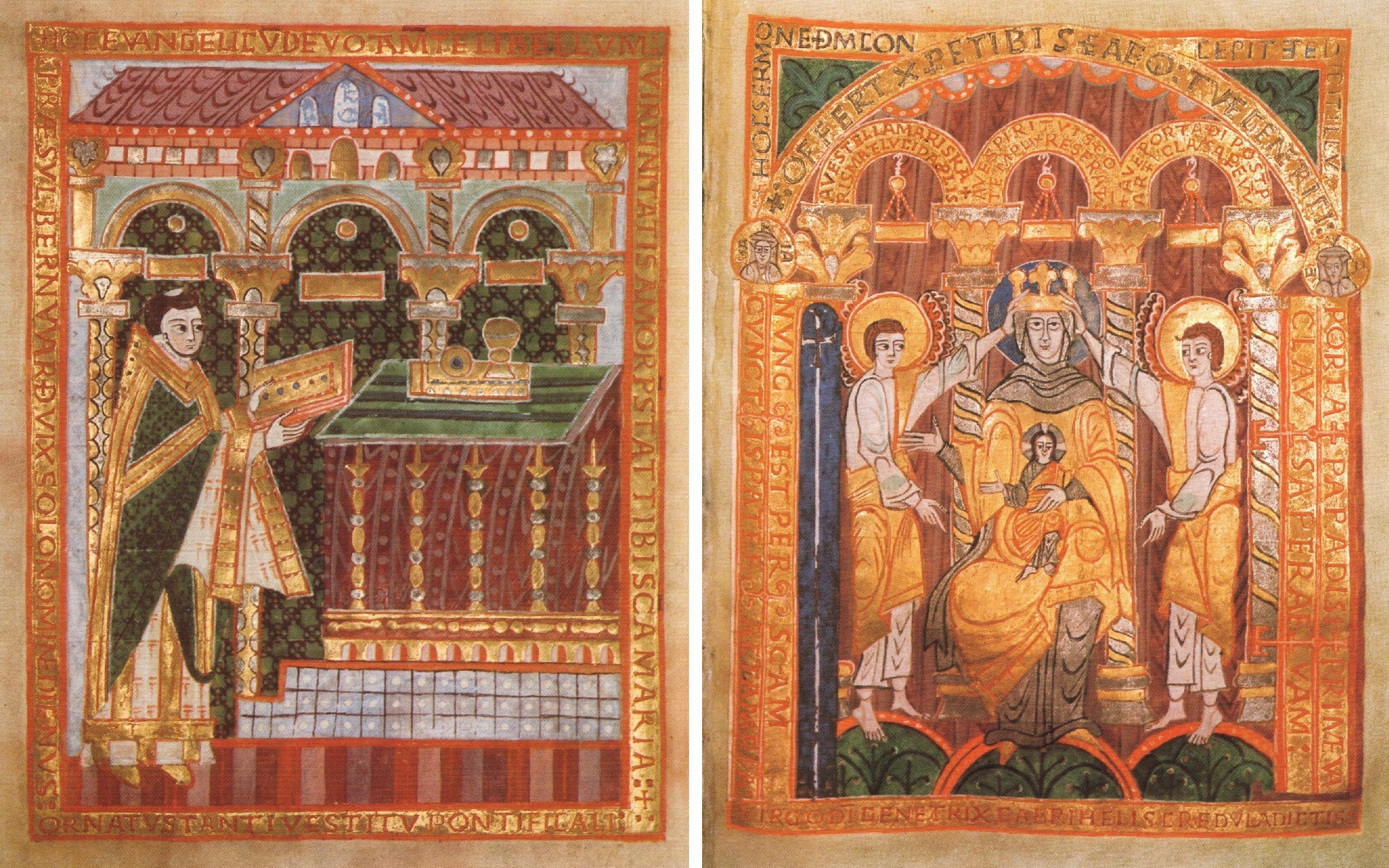
The Bernward Gospels (dedication page) belongs to the great products of Bernward's art.

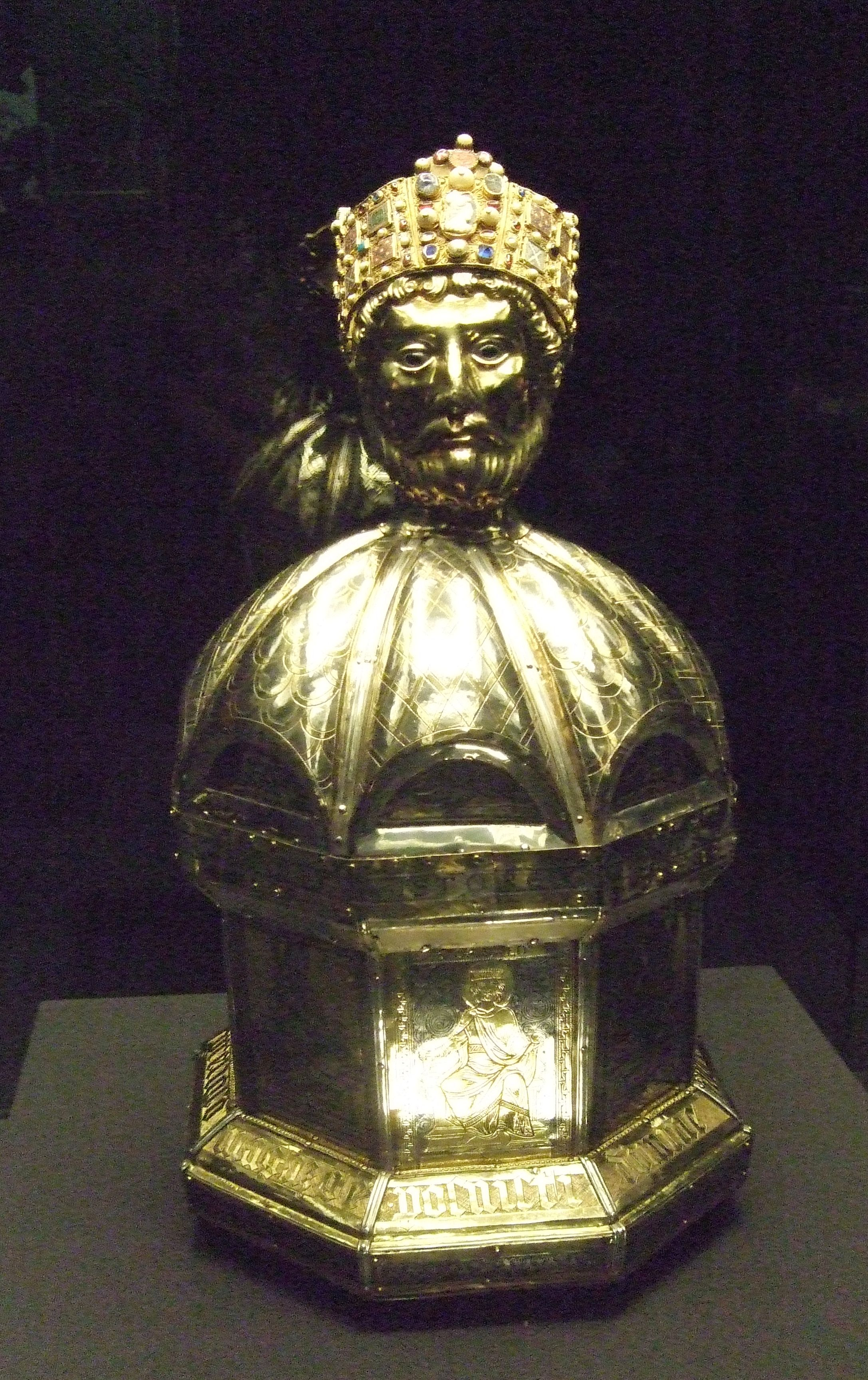
Reliquary of St. Oswald, Hildesheim around 1185–1189, Hildesheim Cathedral Museum, DS23

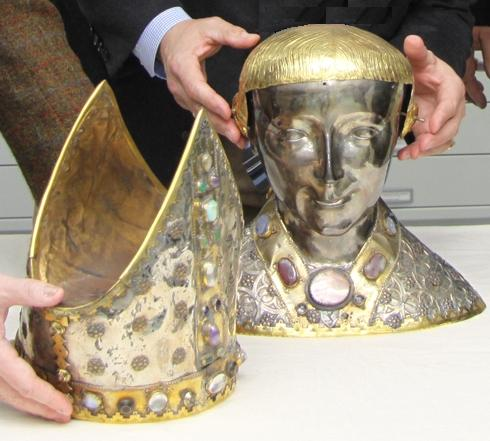
Reliquary of St. Jacob of Nisibis, Hildesheim after 1367 (Battle of Dinklar) (de:Schlacht von Dinklar)

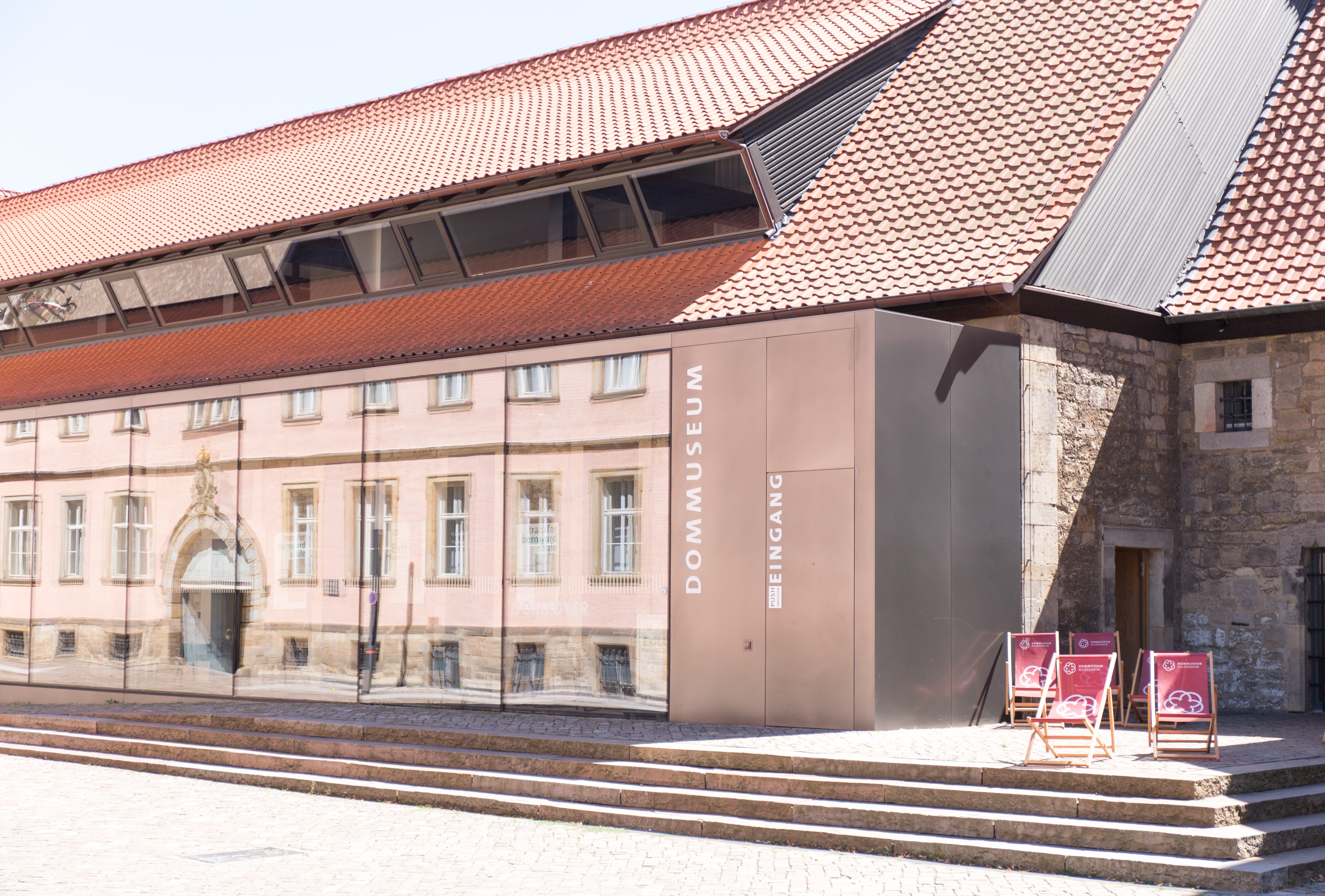
Entrance to the Cathedral Museum in Hildesheim

== Bibliography ==
- Marlis Stähli. Die Handschriften im Domschatz zu Hildesheim. Beschreibungen. Harrassowitz, Wiesbaden 1984, ISBN 3-447-02471-2, online
- Victor H. Elbern. Dom und Domschatz in Hildesheim. 2nd revised edition, Königstein i. T. 1991.
- Abglanz des Himmels. Romanik in Hildesheim (Ausstellungskatalog Hildesheim), ediuted by Michael Brandt, Hildesheim/Regensburg 2001.
