= Hildesheim Reliquary of Mary =

Reliquary in Hilesheim, Germany

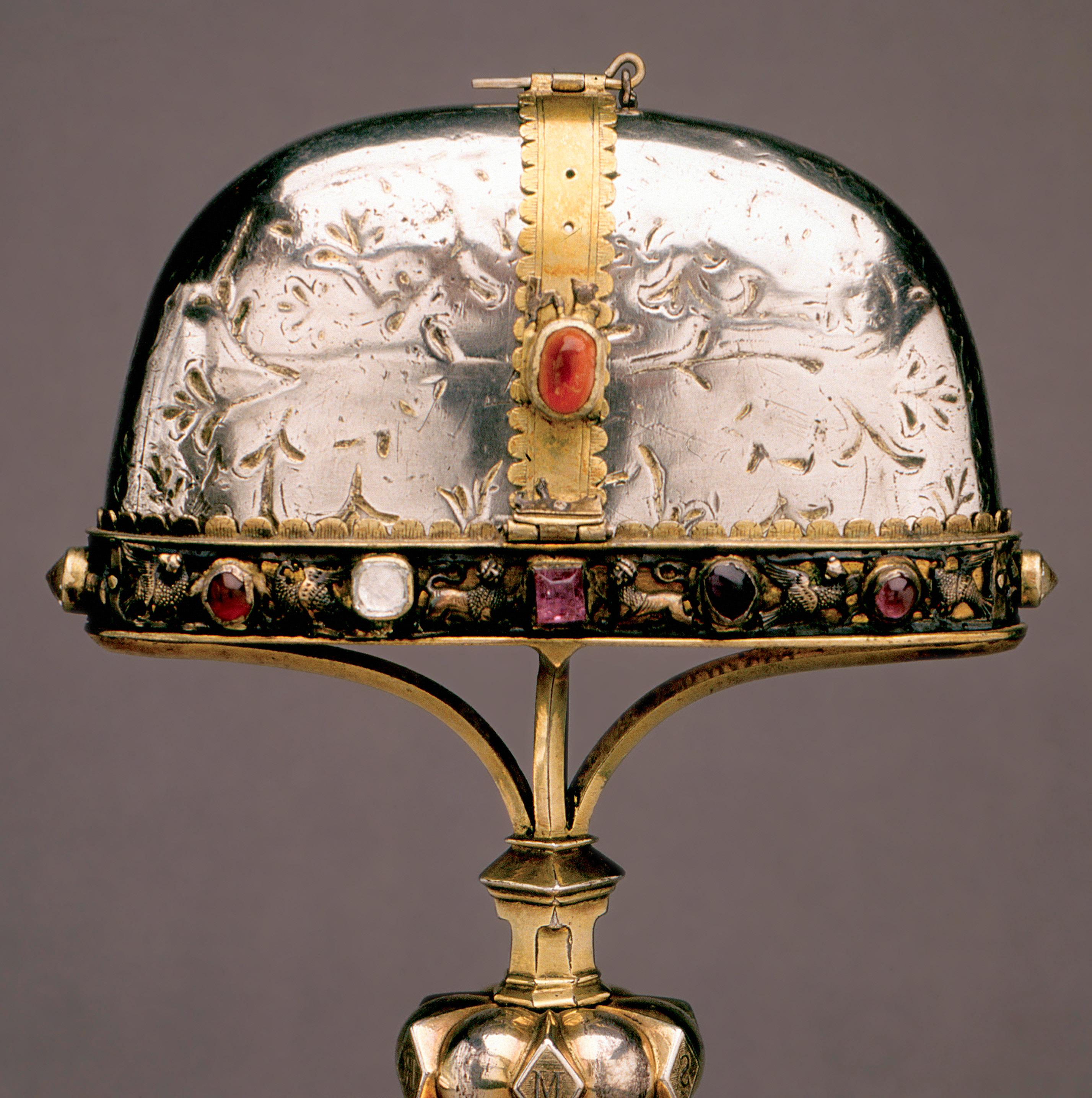
Reliquary of Mary

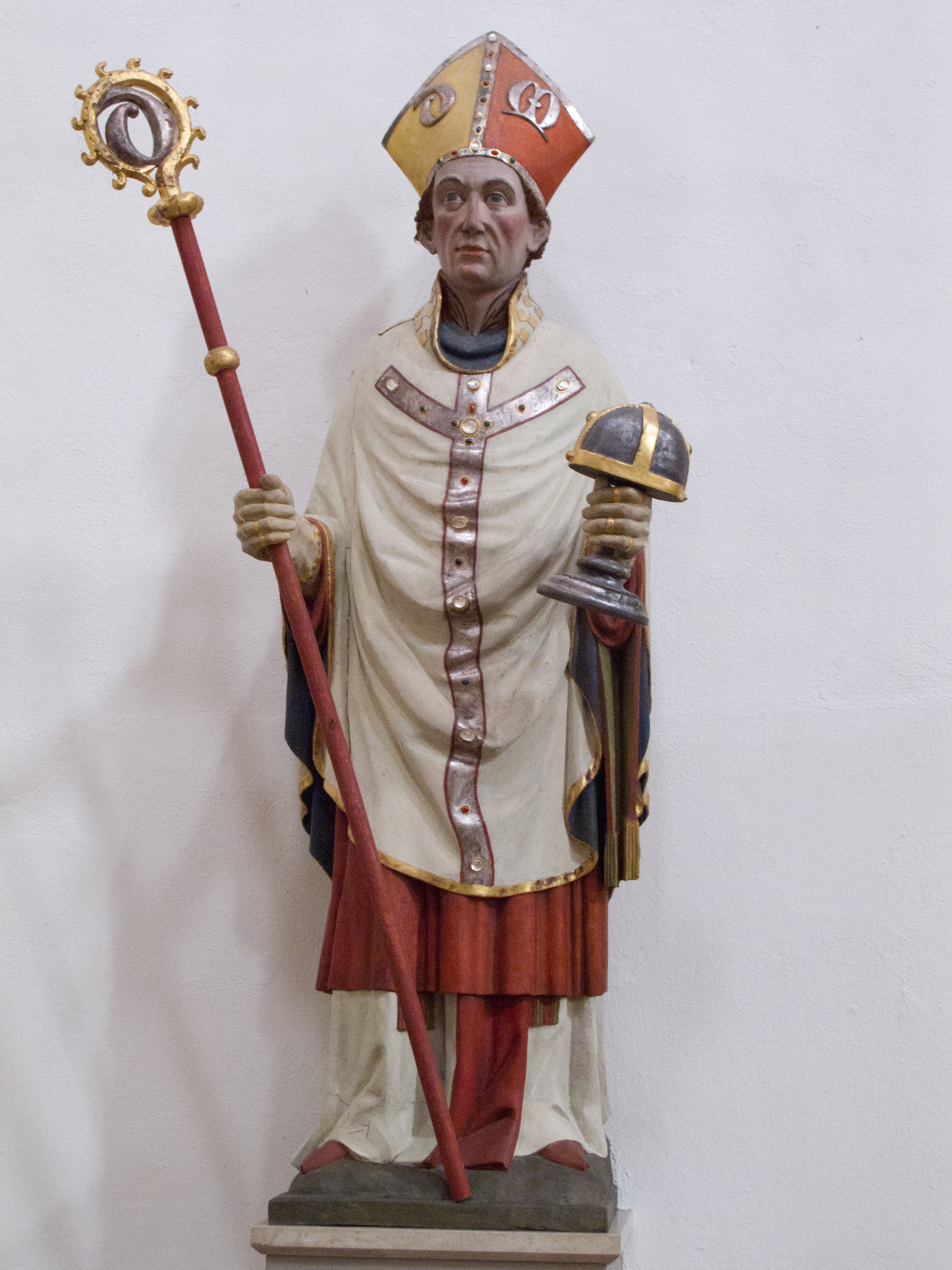
Bishop Godehard with the reliquary in a statue from around 1450 in the basilica of St. Godehard

The Hildesheim Reliquary of Mary (German: Heiligtum Unserer Lieben Frau; Lipsanothek) is a historic and artistically unique reliquary in the Dommuseum in Hildesheim. It dates back to the early period of the diocese and is associated with the legend of the founding of the Cathedral.

== History ==
Tradition and legend claims that in 815 Emperor Louis the Pious had a reliquary that he and his hunting party lost in the woods and upon finding it were unable to free from a rosebush. The Emperor took this as a sign that the Cathedral and diocese were meant to be established at that location (Hildesheim) and dedicated to Mary. Thus, to this day, the reliquary embodies the historical identity and continuity of the diocese. At the ordination of enthronement of a new bishop of Hildesheim, it is presented to them as a special symbol of their solemn reception of the diocese from their predecessor or the Diocesan administrator.

The silver relic-box is the oldest part of the item. It is contained in a removable golden frame and in the Middle Ages it was probably worn by the Bishop around his neck in processions or dangerous situations (e.g. the Battle of Dinkler). The peculiar, semispherical form of the box has no predecessor. The surface is decorated with an engraved Tree of Life, with gilding in the leaves. This decoration has parallels in the early ninth century. The box might therefore derive from the Carolingian court workshop of this earlier time. It is found even in the cathedral's oldest treasury records.

What relic the box held is not known. Probably the original base-plate (which is lost) would have provided the information. Today an inscription runs over the top of the reliquary, which continues on the fourteenth century baseplate: [C]OR[PO]RA S(AN)C(T)ORV[M IN PACE] SEPULT[A] SV[NT] "The bodies of the saints are buried [in peace]", Ecc. 44.14). This phrase from the liturgy does not suit Mary well, whose body was not buried, according to Catholic doctrine, but taken up to Heaven, and had left only "contact relics". An original inscription would probably not subsume Mary into "the saints" either. palaeographic factors support the suggestion that the inscription is contemporary with the new base-plate and originally belonged to another reliquary.

The golden bands with gemstones and the reliquary's stand are more recent than the box itself, dating from the 1220s.

== Bibliography ==
- Michael Brandt, "Heiligtum Unserer Lieben Frau," in Bernward von Hildesheim und das Zeitalter der Ottonen, Vol. 2, Hildesheim 1993, pp. 445–448
