= Bernward Column =

Coordinates: 52.1489°N 9.9472°E

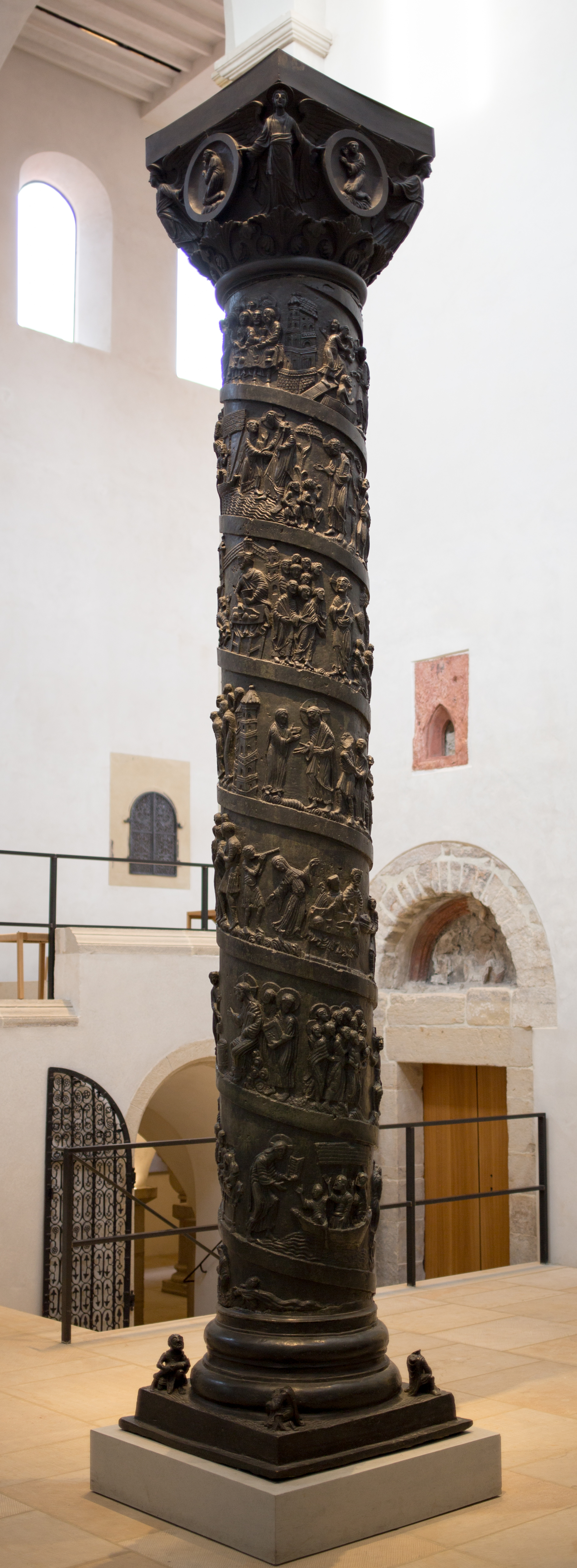
- The Bernward Column in Hildesheim Cathedral (since 1893)
- Year: c. 1020
- Type: victory column
- Medium: bronze
- Dimensions: 3.79 m (149 in); 0.58 m diameter (23 in)
- Location: Hildesheim

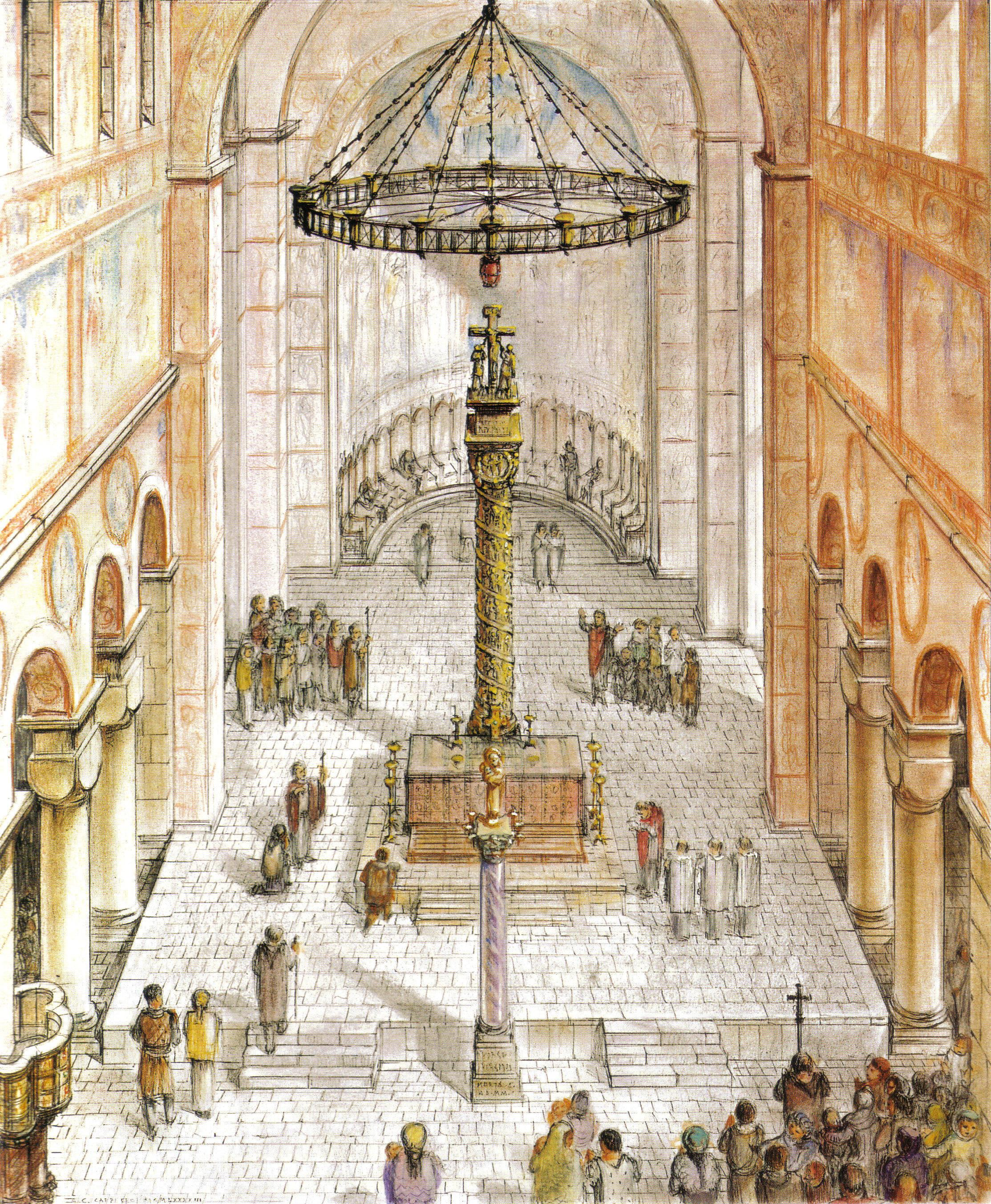
The Bernward Column in St. Michael's (before 1810). Reconstruction by Carpiceci/Gallistl

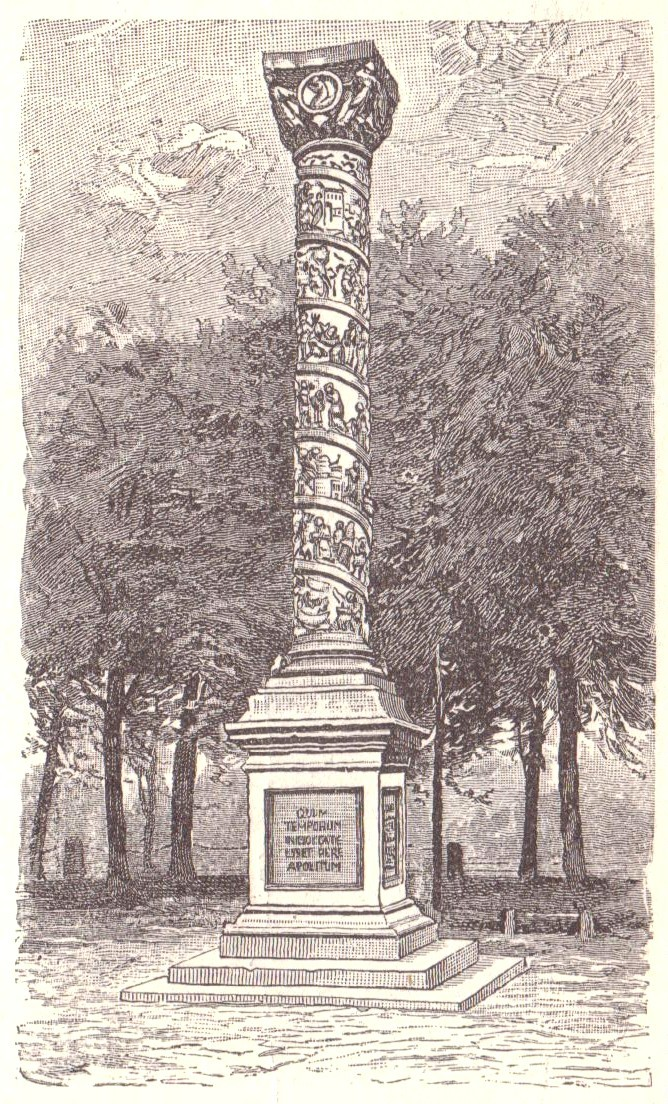
The Bernward Column in the Domhof (1810–1893)

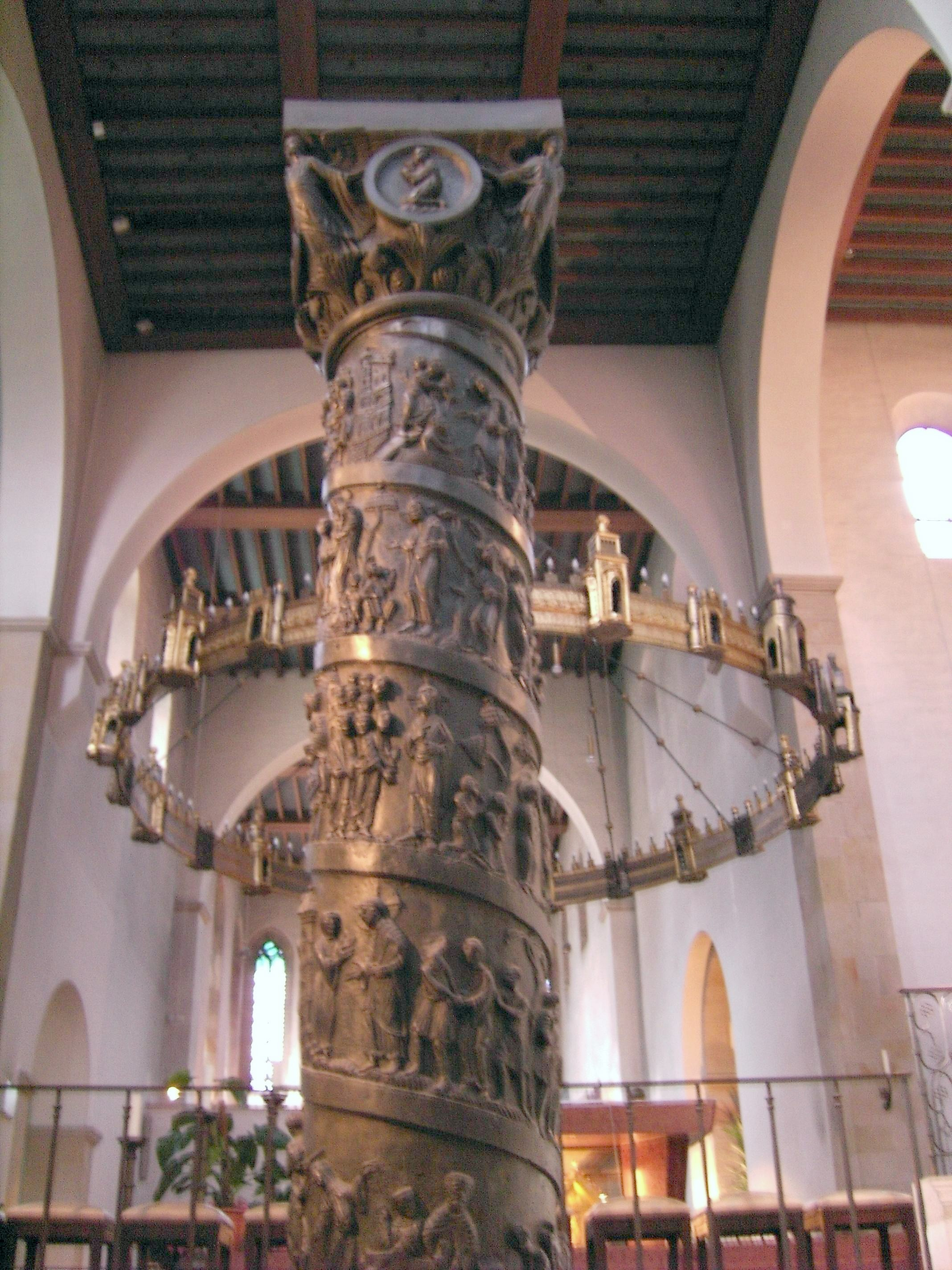
The column in the cathedral, with the Hezilo chandelier in the background

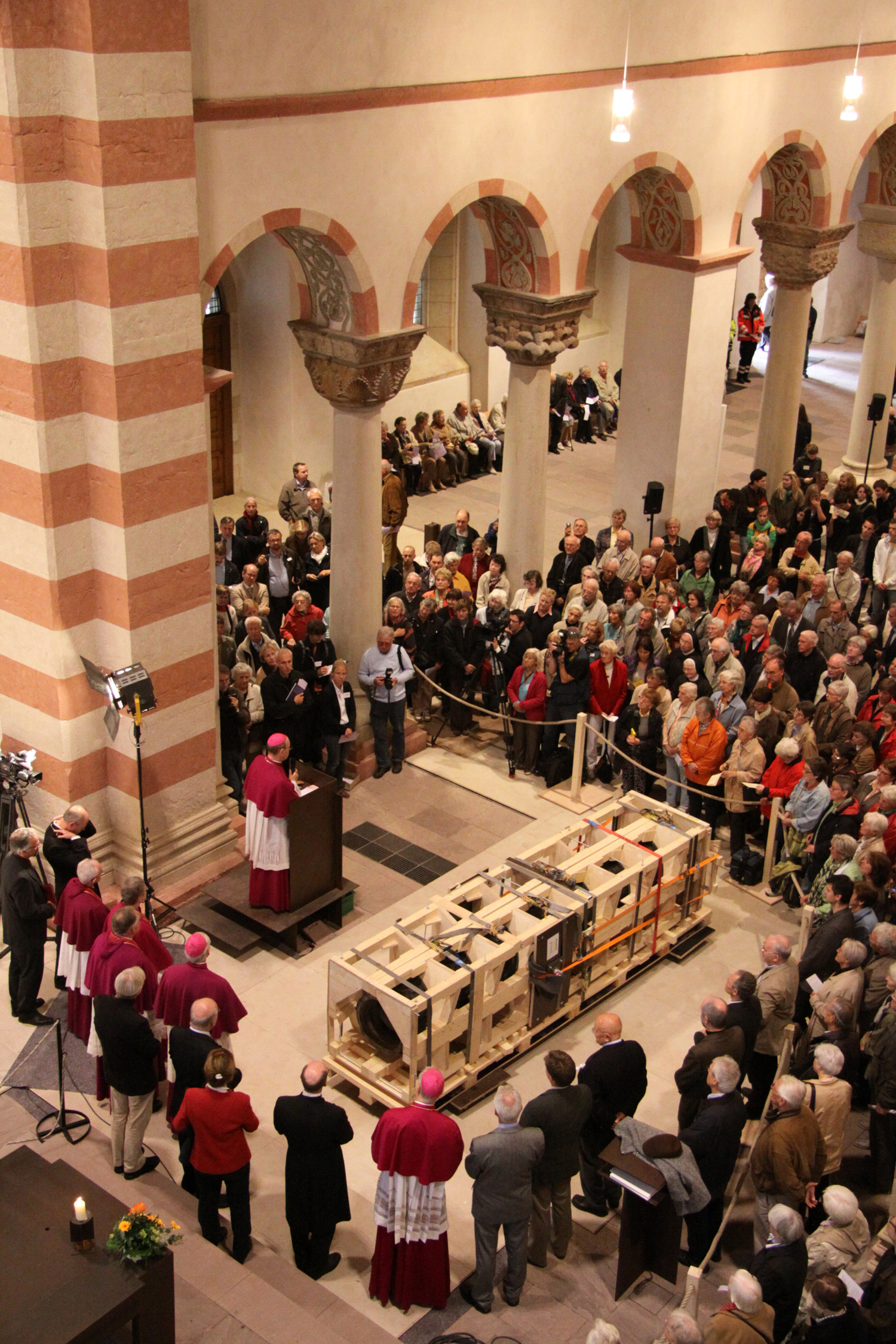
Welcoming the Berward Column to St. Michael's, 30 September 2009

The Bernward Column (German: Bernwardssäule) also known as the Christ Column (German: Christussäule) is a bronze column, made c. 1020 for St. Michael's Church in Hildesheim, Germany, and regarded as a masterpiece of Ottonian art. It was commissioned by Bernward, the thirteenth bishop of Hildesheim in 1020, and made at the same time. It depicts images from the life of Jesus, arranged in a helix similar to Trajan's Column: it was originally topped with a cross or crucifix. During the 19th century, it was moved to a courtyard and later to Hildesheim Cathedral. During the restoration of the cathedral from 2010 to 2014, it was moved back to its original location in St. Michael's, but was returned to the Cathedral in August 2014.

== Original location and history ==
The Bernward Column was made for St. Michael's Church, Hildesheim, the foundation and final resting place of Bishop Bernward. It initially stood in the east choir, behind the altar, with a triumphal cross. This location under the triumphal arch was proposed by Gallistl using literary sources and confirmed in 2006 by excavations. In addition, in front of the altar stood a column of eastern Mediterranean marble covered in copper. According to later sources, it was a gift from Emperor Otto III to Bernward.

The altar was equated with the offering table in the forehall of the Temple of Solomon, which also stood between two columns (Boaz and Jachin). A large wheel chandelier, which was also meant to have been a gift from Otto III to Bernward, hung above the Bernward Column until 1662, with a porphyry jug in the centre that was claimed to derive from the Wedding at Cana. This arrangement of a column topped with a cross, an altar and a wheel chandelier was modelled on the Church of the Holy Sepulchre, which was also equated with the forehall of the Temple of Solomon. Furthermore, the distance of roughly 42 metres (138 ft) between the original location of the column and the grave of Bernward in the west crypt of St. Michael's matched the distance between the Rotunda of the Resurrection and Golgotha in the Church of the Holy Sepulchre, according to the reports of pilgrims.

In 1544, during the chaos of the Reformation in Hildesheim, the cross on top of the column was removed by iconoclasts. It was melted down and recast as a cannon, suggesting that it was of considerable size. After the demolition of the east choir of St. Michael's in 1650 and the resulting collapse of the east crossing, the column's capital, which "weighed about a hundred pounds", was also melted down and replaced by a wooden capital of identical shape and size, meant to hide the replacement. An engraving by Johann Ludwig Brandes (1730) indicates that it was decorated with figures. Since figural capitals of this kind are otherwise only attested from the twelfth century, it has been suggested that the capital that was melted down was not the Bernwardian original either, and that this original was replaced during the renovation of the cloister church in the second half of the twelfth century. The rest of the column was not melted down in the following years (despite its value as raw material) because of its ancient significance as a contact relic, since it was believed to have been made personally by St. Bernward.

In 1810, after the secularisation of the Catholic cloister (1803) and the abolition of the Protestant parish of St. Michael's (1810), the column was removed on the private initiative of diocese officials and installed in the north of the Domhof between the cathedral and the Bishop's house. In 1870 the Hildesheim sculptor Karl Küsthardt gave the column a new bronze capital, which was meant to imitate the wooden capital or an illustration of it and to indirectly preserve the appearance of the old bronze capital, which had supported an impost topped by a bronze crucifix. In 1893 it was moved into the cathedral.

On 30 September 2009 it was moved back to St. Michael's for the duration of the cathedral renovations, which lasted until August 2014.

== Description ==
The Bernward column, which is 3.79 metres (12.4 ft) high and 58 centimetres (23 in) in diameter, is a victory column that Bernward had cast from bronze in conscious imitation of the marble Trajan's Column and the Column of Marcus Aurelius in Rome. Just as those stone columns depict the military deeds of the Emperor in an upward spiralling frieze, so the Bernward column depicts the peaceful deeds of Christ, beginning with his baptism at the Jordan and ending with his triumphal entry into Jerusalem. The column was originally crowned with a triumphal cross.

The column is significant for the vitality of the figural relief, which is unusual for the time. The relief complements the Bernward Doors, which picture the Nativity, Passion, and resurrection of Jesus. Both artworks, like the rest of Bernward's artistic and architectural programme, reflect his efforts to put his seat in the position of a northern Rome in the context of the Ottonian dynasty's renewed Christian Roman Empire and also to emphasise Christ as a model of just and godly kingship for the rulers. For this reason, the execution of John the Baptist by the weak and unjust king Herod Antipas is given a great deal of space.

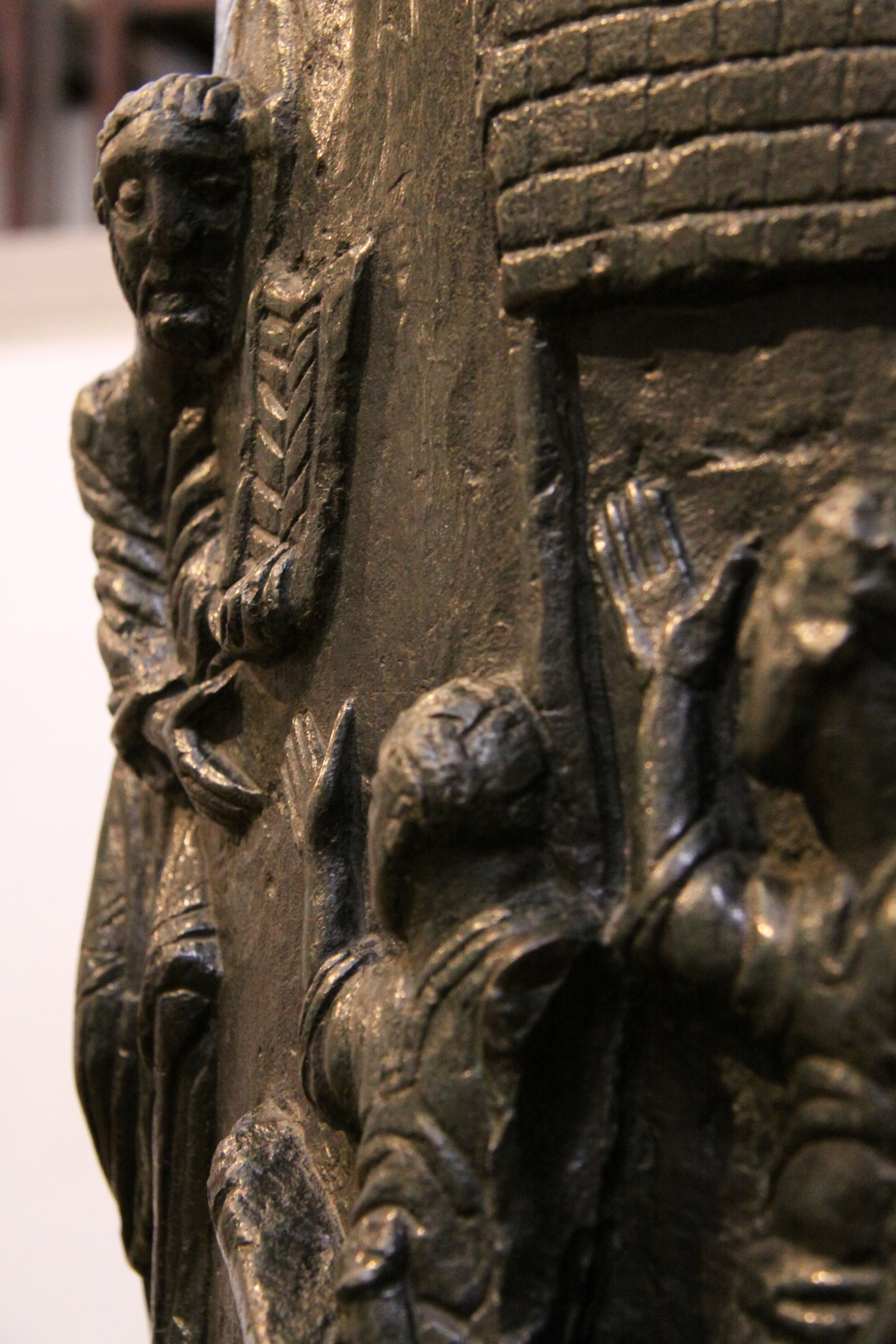
Summoning of the disciples James and John

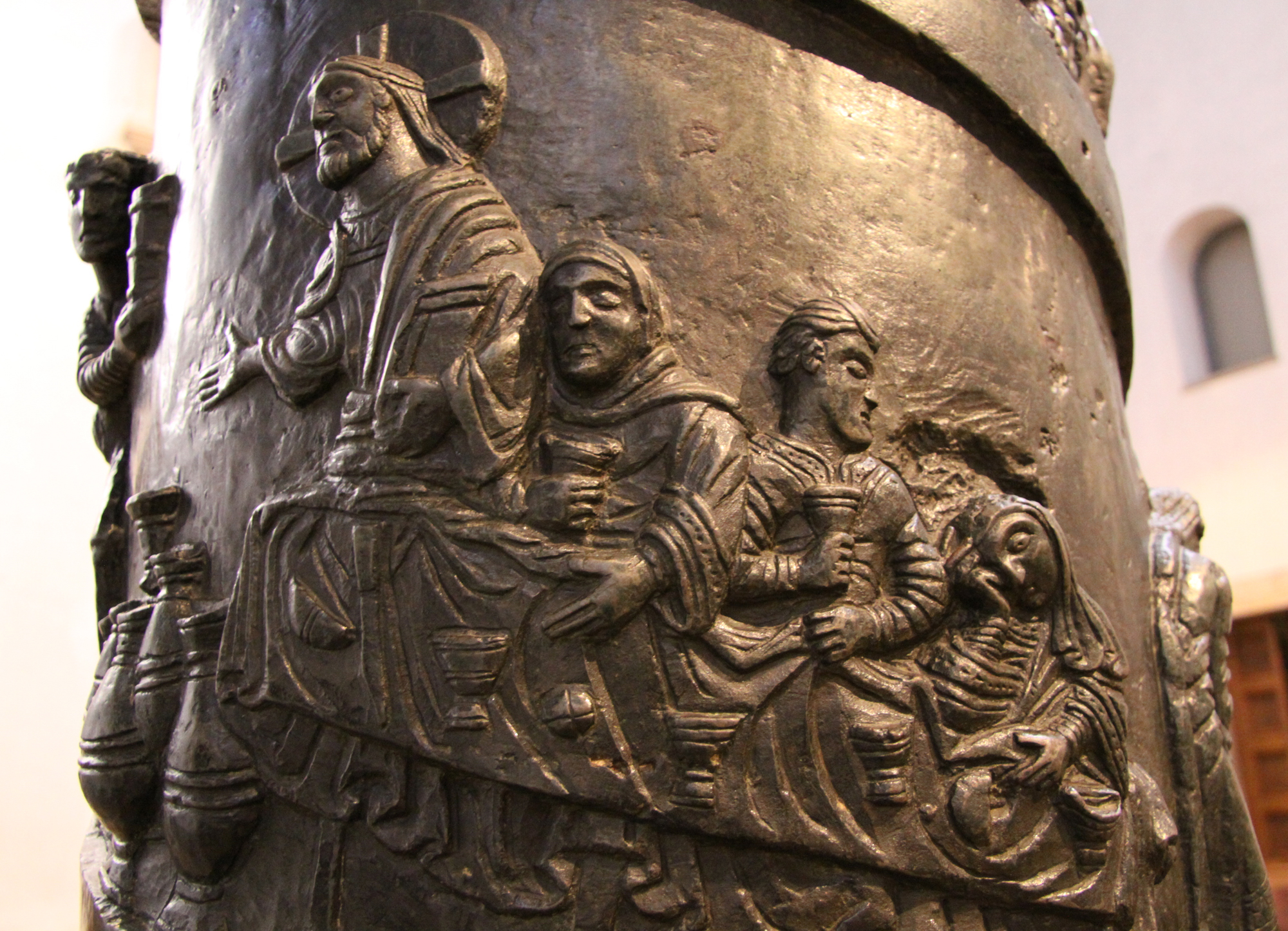
The wedding at Cana

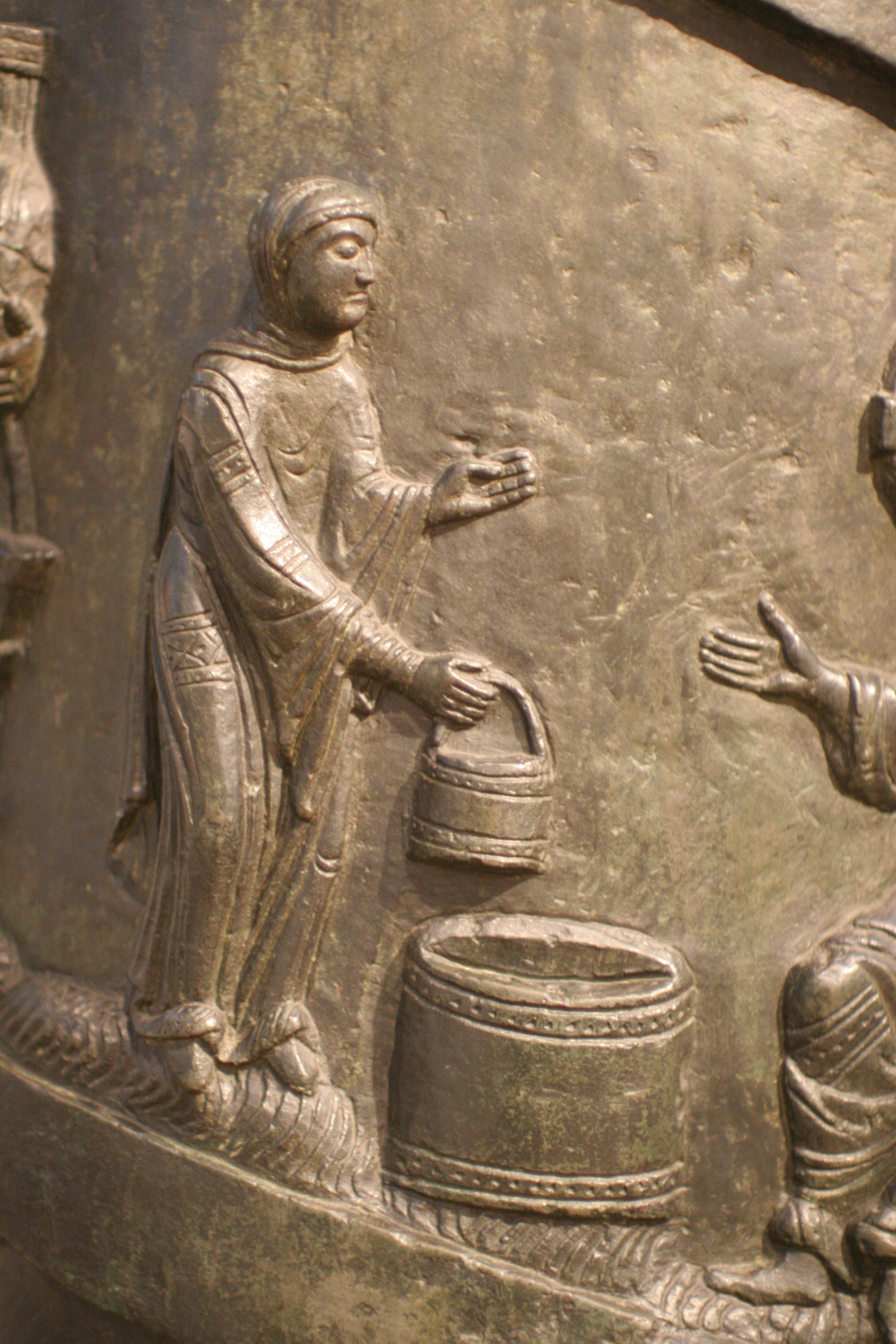
The Samaritan woman at the well

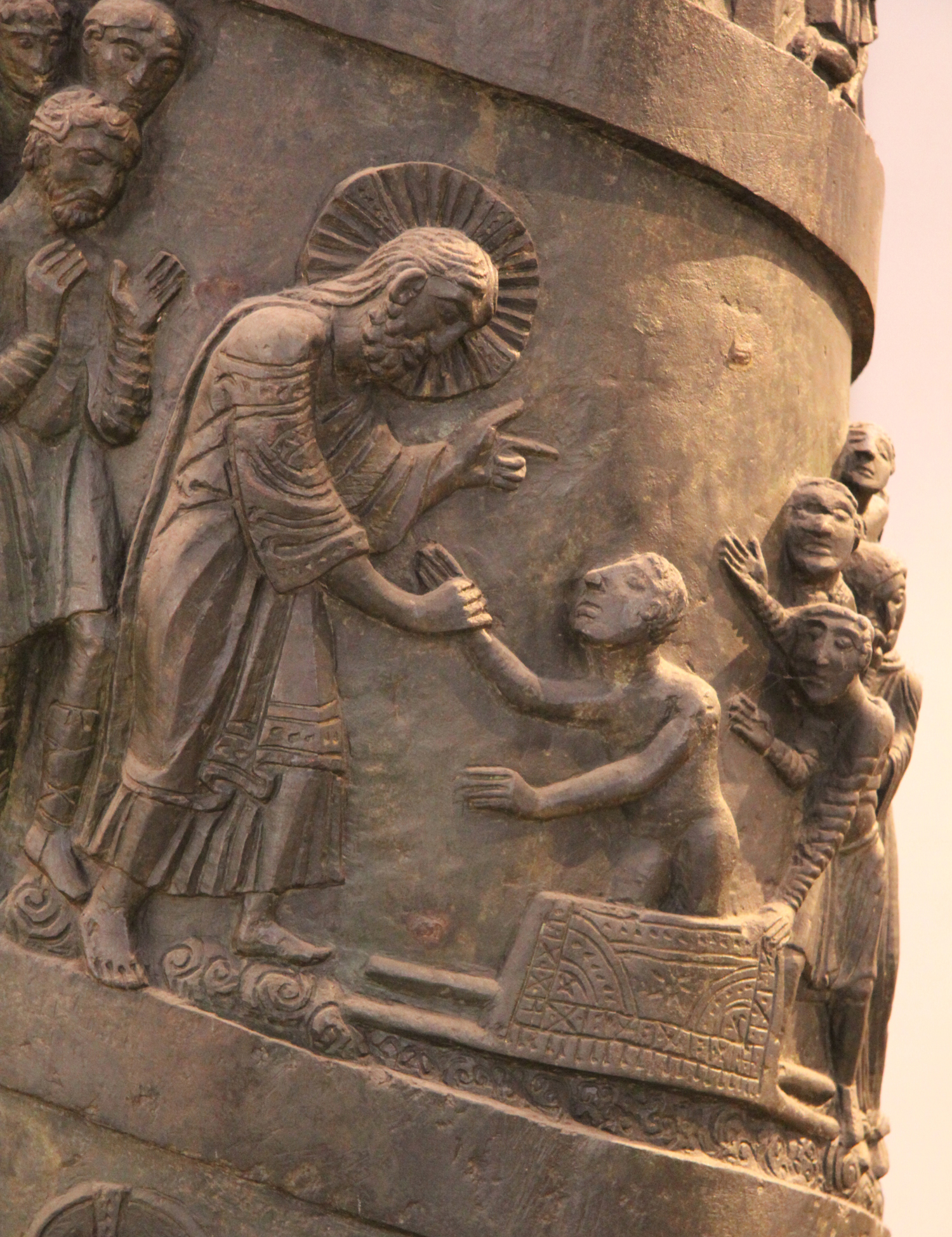
Raising of the son of the widow of Nain

The individual biblical scenes on the Bernward column:

From bottom to top.

- The Baptism of Jesus by John the Baptist in the Jordan (Mt 3, Mk 1, Lk 3)
- Temptation of Christ (Mt 4, Lk 4)
- The calling of Simon Peter and Andrew (Mt 4, Mk 1),
- The calling of the sones of Zebedee (James and John) (Mt 4, Mk 1)
- The Wedding at Cana John 2
- Jesus cleansing a leper (Mt 8, Mk 1, Lk 5)
- Uncertain:
  - Brandt: Confession of Peter (Mt 16, Mk 827–30, Lk 9)
  - Gallistl: Mission of the twelve (Mt 10, Mk 6, Lk 9)
  - Less likely: Commissioning of the Twelve Apostles (Mt 10, Mk 3, Lk 6)
- The Samaritan woman at the well John 4
- John the Baptist's admonition of Herod Antipas and Herodias (Mt 14, Mk 6, Lk 3)
- Arrest of John the Baptist (Mt 14, Mk 6, Lk 3)
- The dance of Salome and the Beheading of St. John the Baptist (Mt 14, Mk 6, Lk 9)
- Jesus healing the bleeding woman and the Raising of Jairus' daughter (Mt 9, Mk 5, Lk 8)
- Healing of the Blind man of Bethsaida Mk 8
- Jesus and the woman taken in adultery John 8
- Raising of the son of the widow of Nain Lk 7
- Temptation of Jesus on Mount Tabor (Mt 17, Mk 9, Lk 9)
- Uncertain:
  - Brandt: Little Commission Mt 10
  - Gallistl: Discourse on Defilement (Mt 15, Mk 7)
- Parable of the Rich man and Lazarus - Lazarus at the table of the rich man Lk 16
- Parable of the Rich man and Lazarus - The rich man in Hell and the poor man in the Bosom of Abraham Lk 16
- Jesus and Zacchaeus Lk 19
- Cursing the fig tree (Mt 21, Mk 11)
- Uncertain:
  - Brandt: Healing the two blind men in Galilee Mt 20
  - Gallistl: Healing the sick of Gennesaret (Mt 14, Mk 6, John 6)
- Jesus saves the sinking Peter Mt 14
- Uncertain:
  - Brandt: The Feeding of the 5,000 (Mt 14, Mk 6, Lk 9,John 6)
  - Gallistl: The Feeding of the 4,000 Mt 15
- Mary and Martha, the sisters of Lazarus, before Jesus John 11
- Raising of Lazarus John 11
- Anointing of Jesus (Mt 26, Mk 14, John 12)
- Jesus' Triumphal entry into Jerusalem (Mt 21, Mk 11, Lk 19, John 12)

== Liturgical significance ==
An important indicator of the liturgical significance of the Bernward column is its original location on the central axis of St. Michael's, near the altar, where Holy Communion was distributed and where the sacrament was kept. In the reliefs the importance of the gospels on Palm Sunday is emphasised, which might be connected with the Cluniac reforms. The references to the Lenten and penitential rites, which are also found in the imagery of the Bernward Doors, support this.

== Cast ==
Since 1874 there has been a plaster cast of the column in the Victoria and Albert Museum, in London, bought for £18 from one F. Künsthardt.

== Bibliography ==
- Heinz Josef Adamski, Hermann Wehmeyer: Die Christussaule im Dom zu Hildesheim, Hildesheim 1979
- Michael Brandt, Arne Eggebrecht (ed.): Bernward von Hildesheim und das Zeitalter der Ottonen, Katalog der Ausstellung 1993. vol. II, Bernward, Hildesheim 1993, ISBN 3-87065-736-7.
- Michael Brandt: Bernwards Säule - Schätze aus dem Dom zu Hildesheim. Verlag Schnell & Steiner GmbH, Regensburg 2009, ISBN 978-3-7954-2046-8.
- Bernhard Bruns: Die Bernwardsäule, Lebensbaum und Siegessäule. Hildesheim 1995
- Bernhard Gallistl: Der Dom zu Hildesheim und sein Weltkulturerbe, Bernwardstür und Christussäule. Hildesheim 2000 ISBN 3-89366-500-5.rev. by Isa Ragusa. Medaevistik 8, 1995, p. 336-337
- Bernhard Gallistl: Die Bernwardsäule und die Michaeliskirche zu Hildesheim. Mit Fotos von Johannes Scholz, Veröffentlichungen des Landschaftsverbandes Hildesheim e.V. Verlag Georg Olms. Hildesheim 1993. ISBN 3-487-09755-9.
- Roswitha Hespe: Die Bernwardsäule zu Hildesheim. Diss masch. Bonn 1949
- Joanna Olchawa: Zur Bernwardsäule in Hildesheim. MA-Arbeit. Institut für Kunstgeschichte. FU Berlin. 2008
