= Diocesan museum =

External videos
- 3D Virtual Tour of Diocesan Museum Tiepolo Fresco Galleries. Frescoes by painter Giambattista Tiepolo.

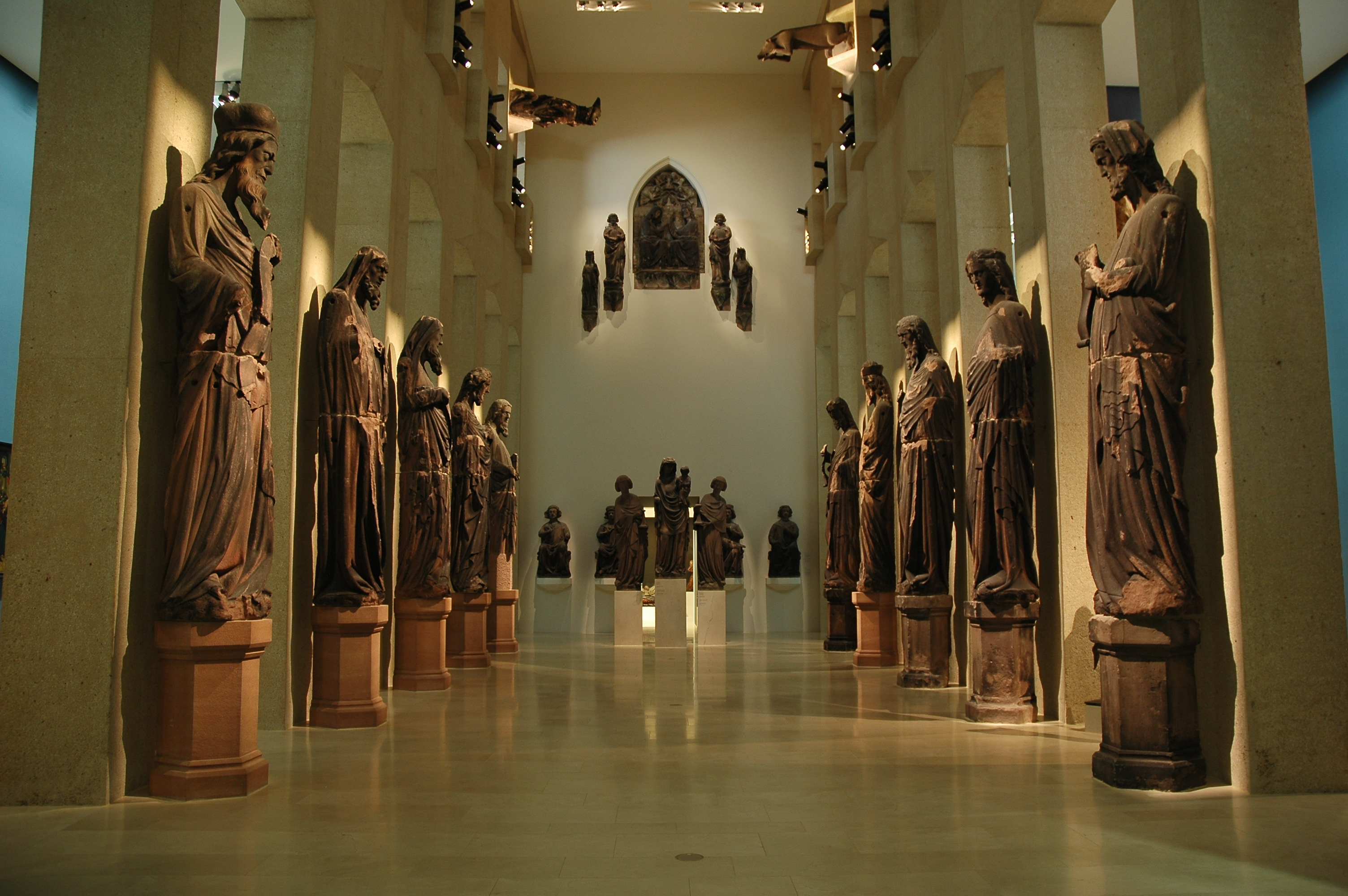
The Sculpture Hall of the Augustiner Museum, Freiburg.

A diocesan museum is a museum for an ecclesiastical diocese, a geographically based division of the Christian Church.

Austria:

- Diocesan Museum, Graz, Styria
- Gurk Treasury, Carinthia
- Diocesan Museum, Linz, Upper Austria
- Cathedral Museum Salzburg, Salzburg state (Diocesan and Cathedral Chapter collections)
- Diocesan Museum, St. Pölten, Lower Austria
- Cathedral and Diocesan Museum, Vienna
- Evangelical Diocesan Museum, Burgenland in the Evangelical Prayer House in the Mönchhof Village Museum
- Evangelical Diocesan Museum, Fresach in Fresach, Carinthia
- Evangelical Diocesan Museum, Styria in Murau

Germany:

- Augustiner Museum Freiburg, Diocesan Museum, for the Archbishopric of Freiburg
- Diocesan Museum, Bamberg
- Kolumba, Archepiscopal Diocesan Museum, Cologne
- Diocesan Museum, Eichstätt
- Domberg Museum, Freising
- Cathedral Museum, Fulda
- Cathedral Museum, Hildesheim
- Cathedral and Diocesan Museum, Mainz
- Diocesan Museum, Osnabrück
- Archepiscopal Diocesan Museum, and Cathedral Treasury, Paderborn
- Bishopric Museums, Regensburg
- Diocesan Museum, Rottenburg

Italy:

- Diocesan Museum, Brixen
- Diocesan Museum (Cortona)

Spain:

- Diocesan Museum of Sacred Art, Álava (es)
- Diocesan Museum, Albarracín (es)
- Diocesan Museum, Alcalá de Henares (es)
- Diocesan Museum, Barbastro
- Diocesan Museum, Barcelona (ca)
- Diocesan Museum of Sacred Art, Bilbao (es)
- Cathedral [and Diocesan] Museum, Burgo de Osma
- Co-cathedral and Diocesan Museum, Cáceres
- Diocesan Museum, Calahorra
- Diocesan Museum, Ciudad Real
- Diocesan and Cathedral Museum, Ciudad Rodrigo (es)
- Diocesan Museum, Córdoba (es)
- Diocesan Museum, Cuenca (es)
- Diocesan Museum, Ibiza
- Diocesan Museum, Huelva (es)
- Diocesan Museum, Huesca (es)
- Diocesan Museum, Jaca (es)
- Cathedral [and Diocesan] Museum, Jaén (es)
- Diocesan Museum, La Seu d'Urgell (ca)
- Diocesan Museum of Sacred Art, Las Palmas de Gran Canaria (es)
- Diocesan and Cathedral Museum, León (es)
- Diocesan and Comarcal Lleida Museum, Lleida
- Diocesan and Cathedral Museum, Lugo
- Diocesan Museum of Sacred Art, Moguer (es)
- Cathedral and Diocesan Museum, Mondoñedo (gl)
- Diocesan Museum of Sacred Art, Orihuela (es)
- Church Museum, Oviedo (es)
- Diocesan Museum, Palencia (es)
- Diocesan Museum, Palma de Mallorca (ca)
- Cathedral and Diocesan Museum, Pamplona
- Diocesan Museum, Salamanca (es)
- Diocesan Museum, San Sebastián
- Regina Coeli Diocesan Museum, Santillana del Mar (es)
- Cathedral Museum, Segorbe
- Diocesan Museum of Ancient Art, Sigüenza (es)
- Diocesan and Regional Museum, Solsona (ca)
- Diocesan Museum, Tarragona (ca)
- [Diocesan] Museum of Sacred Art, Teruel
- Diocesan Museum, Tui, Spain
- Diocesan and Cathedral Museum, Valencia (es)
- Diocesan and Cathedral Museum, Valladolid (es)
- Episcopal Museum, Vic (ca)
- Diocesan Museum, Zamora (es)
- Alma Mater Museum [Diocesan Museum], Zaragoza (es)

South Korea:

- Diocesan Museum, Seoul (ko)
- Diocesan Museum, Incheon

== See also ==
- Early Christian art and architecture
- Vatican Museums
