= St. Michael's Church, Hildesheim =

St. Michael's
- Church of St. Michael's
- Michaeliskirche or St. Michaelis
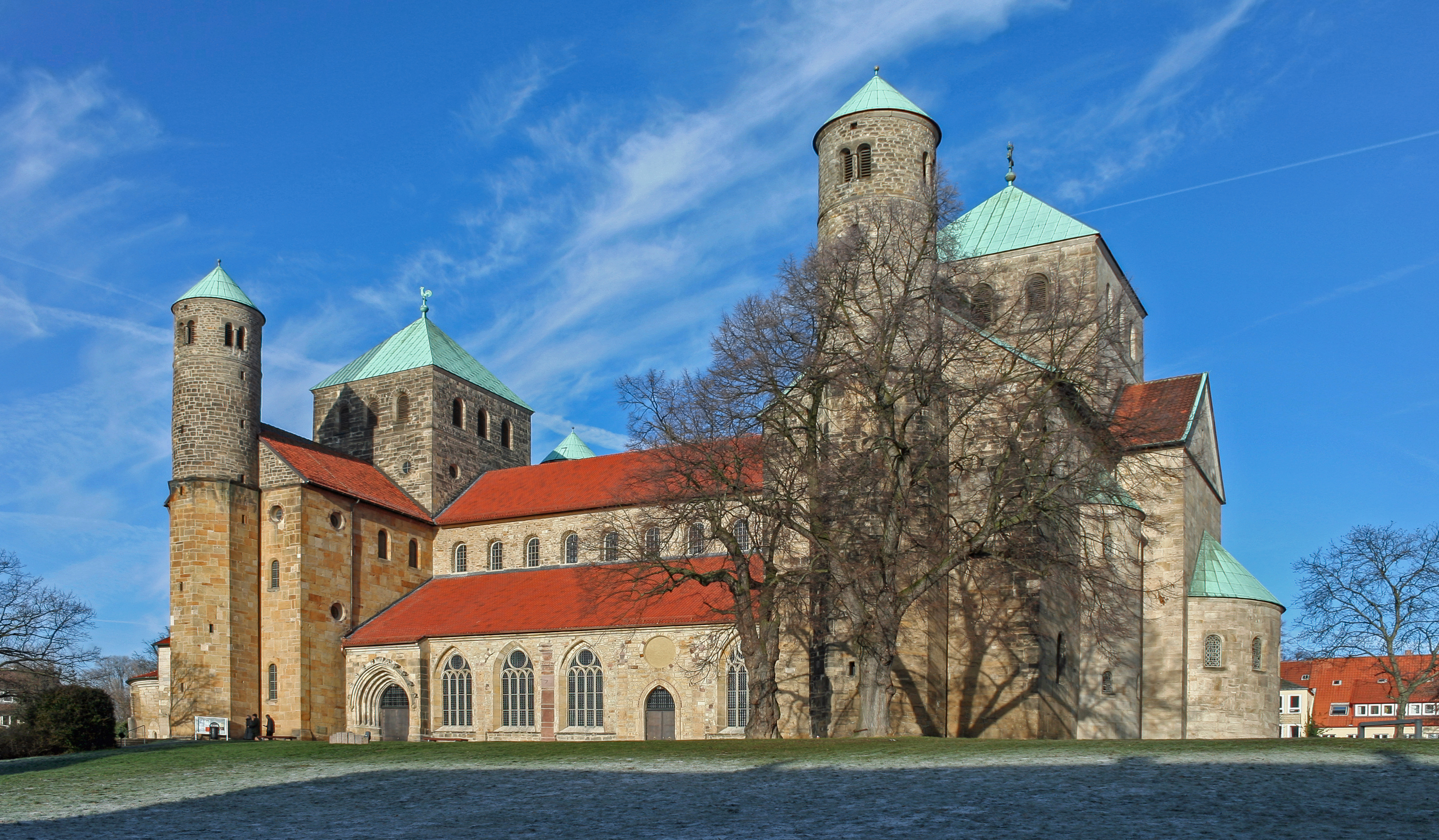
- St. Michaelis in 2009, view from southeast

- Location within Lower Saxony Location within Germany
- 52°09′10″N 09°56′37″E
- Location: Hildesheim
- Country: Germany
- Denomination: simultaneum (Lutheran and Catholic)
- Website: michaelis-hildesheim.wir-e.de/kirche

History
- Status: parish church
- Dedication: Michael the Archangel
- Consecrated: 1022

Architecture
- Functional status: active
- Architectural type: basilica with 2 quires and 2 transepts
- Style: Romanesque; Gothic (southern side windows)
- Groundbreaking: late 10th century
- Completed: late 12th century

Specifications
- Length: overall: 74.75 metres (245.2 ft) nave between crossings: 27.34 metres (89.7 ft) transepts: 40.01 metres (131.3 ft)
- Width: nave: 22.75 metres (74.6 ft) transepts: 11.38 metres (37.3 ft)

Administration
- Deanery: Hildesheim-Sarstedt (Kirchenkreis), Hildesheim (Dekanat)

UNESCO World Heritage Site
- Official name: St Michael's Lutheran Church
- Part of: St Mary's Cathedral and St Michael's Church at Hildesheim
- Criteria: Cultural: (i), (ii), (iii)
- Reference: 187bis-001
- Inscription: 1985 (9th Session)
- Extensions: 2008
- Area: 0.58 ha (1.4 acres)
- Buffer zone: 157.68 ha (389.6 acres)

The Church of St. Michael (German: Michaeliskirche) is an early-Romanesque church located in Hildesheim, Germany. It has been on the UNESCO World Cultural Heritage list since 1985 due to the before mentioned early-Romanesque architecture and art found within such as the Tree of Jesse and the now relocated Bernward Doors.

Following the Protestant reformation, St. Michael's became a shared church, with the majority of the structure being Lutheran and the crypt Roman Catholic.

== History ==
Bishop Bernward of Hildesheim (996–1022) commissioned this Benedictine monastery to be constructed on a hill linked with the archangel Michael just half a kilometer north of the city walls of his seat in Hildesheim. The structuring of the church began in 1010 and the unfinished monastery was dedicated to the Archangel Michael on archangel's feast day (29 September) in 1022 by Bernward, mere weeks before his death. Along with Bernward's significant influence on the building, layout, and physicality of the Abbey, he was personally trained in bronze casting as well as "painting and metalwork" which he honed during his time as a private tutor to Otto lll. This knowledge proved valuable within his critical position in the creation of the church, and we see much of his personal Romanesque style, which he garnered with Otto lll in Rome, within.

As Bernward died before the completion of the church, construction was continued under his successor, Bishop Godehard, who completed the work in 1031 and reconsecrated the church to Michael on 29 September of that same year. After the church's completion in 1033, Godehard transported Bernward's remains from their original resting place to the crypt of the Abbey.

The monastery comprises a church family and has two other sanctuaries dedicated to Martin and the Holy Cross lying in the cloister that extended northward from St. Michael's north flank. The monastery and church open southward toward the city of Hildesheim, its south flank comprising a facade of a sort. With this information, it seems likely that the monastery on the Hill of St. Michael was surrounded by a wall.

In 1186, after a reconstruction following a fire, Hildesheim's Bishop Adelog of Dorstedt – assisted by Tammo, Prince-Bishop of Verden – reconsecrated St. Michael's.

During the Reformation ca. 1542, with the support of governmental bodies overseeing Hildesheim, newly empowered Lutheran Protestants began to systematically overtake parts of the church and left very little to the previously administrative monastic body. Under this new ownership, much of the structural elements of the church were damaged, but with the help of modern technology, many of these places in the church affected by a lack of maintenance have been cared for, and much of the church has been rebuilt to emulate its former appearance.

St. Michael's Church also was heavily damaged by a British air raid on 22 March 1945. Reconstruction on the church began in 1950 and was completed in 1957.

== Architecture ==
St. Michael's Church is a double-choir basilica with two tripartite transepts at either end of the nave and a square tower at each crossing. Along with these large towers at the crossings, there are four other tall and narrow towers attached to the small sides of the two transepts.

The eastern choir featured three apses, and the west choir is emphasized by a single apse rising high over an elaborate cross-vaulted crypt with an ambulatory. Nikolaus Pevsner wrote that St. Michael's "is the earliest surviving example of a truly Romanesque exterior."

The ground plan of the building follows a geometrical conception, in which the square of the transept crossing in the ground plan constitutes the key measuring unit for the entire church. The square units are defined by the alternation of columns and piers. Pevsner described this as a "more thorough 'metrical system'" than found in any prior Romanesque architecture.

During his time as Otto's tutor, it is recorded that Bernward visited Rome and lived there for a time. During this time abroad, Bernward would have taken notice to the Early Christian Basilicas in Rome which were notorious for their unexciting interiors at this time. Through the many architectural feats and intricacies found in the church such as the Tree of Jesse and the Bernward doors, we see the Bishop completely rejecting this practice of monotony previously found in many popular, current works.

The ceiling of the church is decorated with a painting, 27.6 m long and 8.7 m wide, depicting the Tree of Jesse, the ancestral line of Jesus. This artwork, created around 1130, was created using over 1,300 oak planks and was heavily restored to its current form in 2010.

The famous Bernward Doors, which feature bronze reliefs of scenes from the Bible, were most likely commissioned after 1008, and were originally ordered for St. Michael's by Bernward but are now found at the nearby Cathedral of Hildesheim. These incredibly detailed doors depict 16 scenes in total and begin with scenes on the left with stories of Genesis and move into New Testament depictions on the right. The doors were crafted in this way to allow the viewer the opportunity to see the decline and Holy Redemption of humanity through Christ's resurrection. Along with this, many of the stories depicted in the doors were almost certainly drawn from works Bernward himself encountered on his various travels.

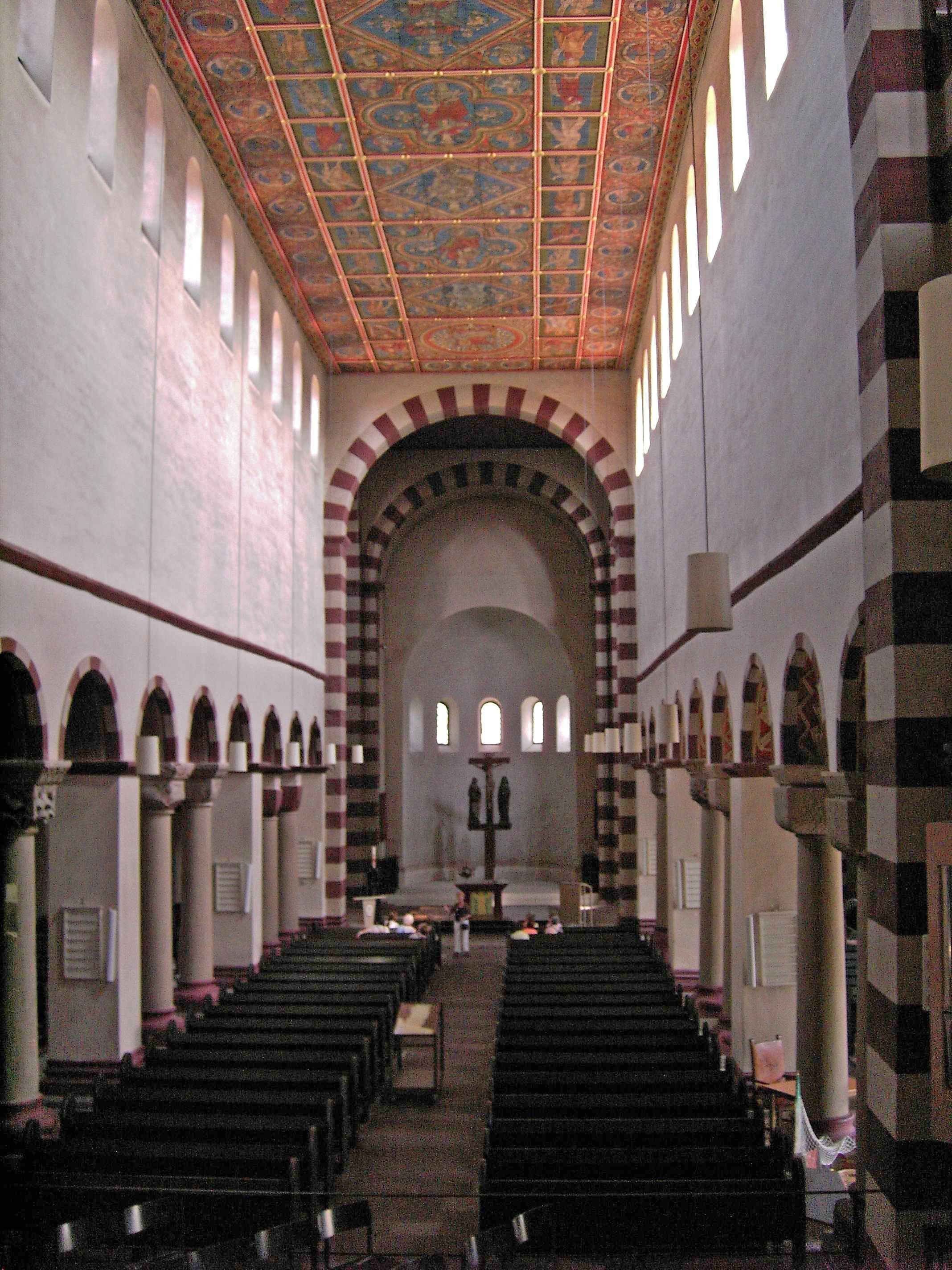
Interior of St. Michael's St. preceding restoration in 2005

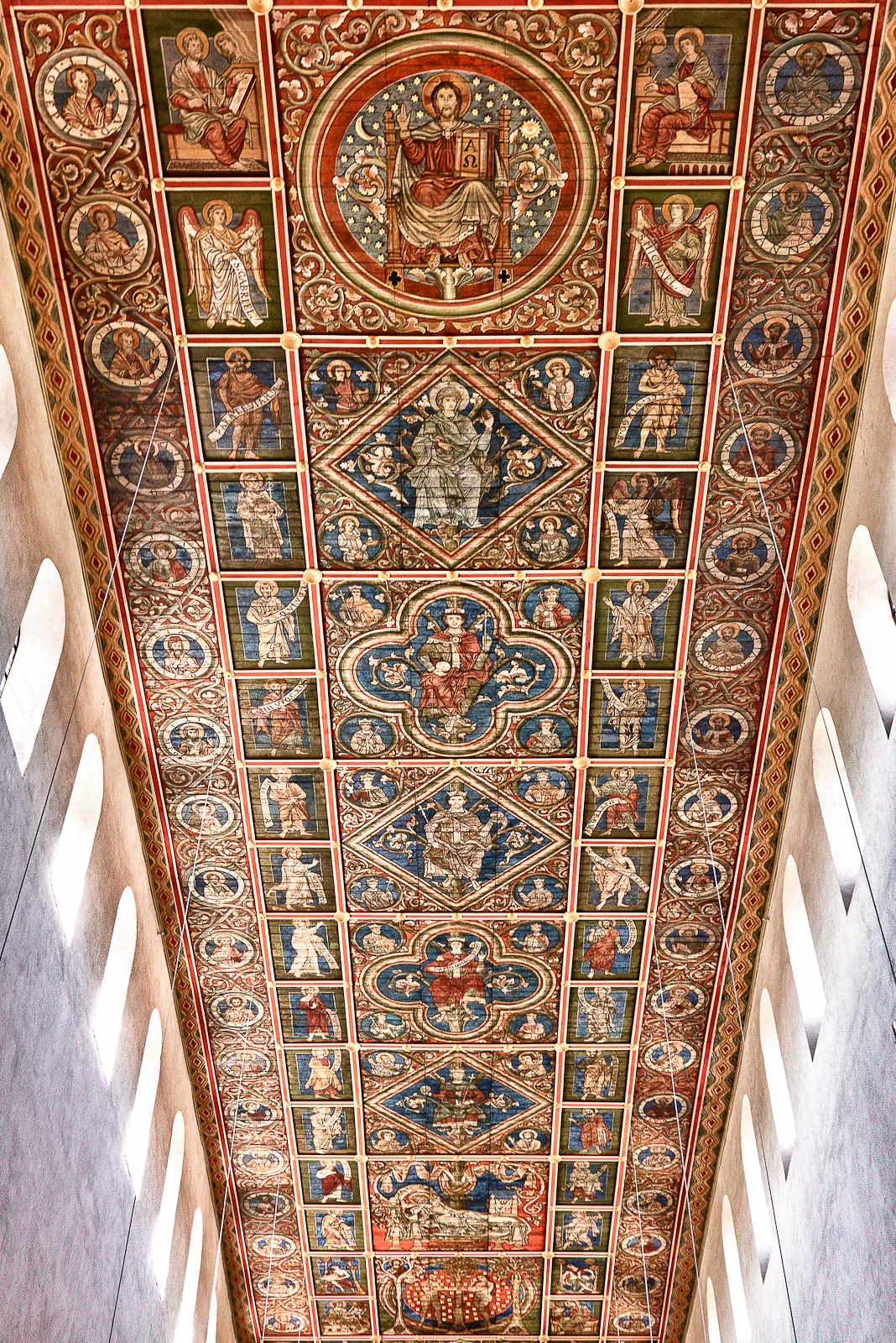
The wooden ceilings found in Hildesheim along with the wooden ceilings of Zillis (Switzerland) and Dädesjö (Sweden), are some of the few panel paintings of the high Middle Ages that have survived.

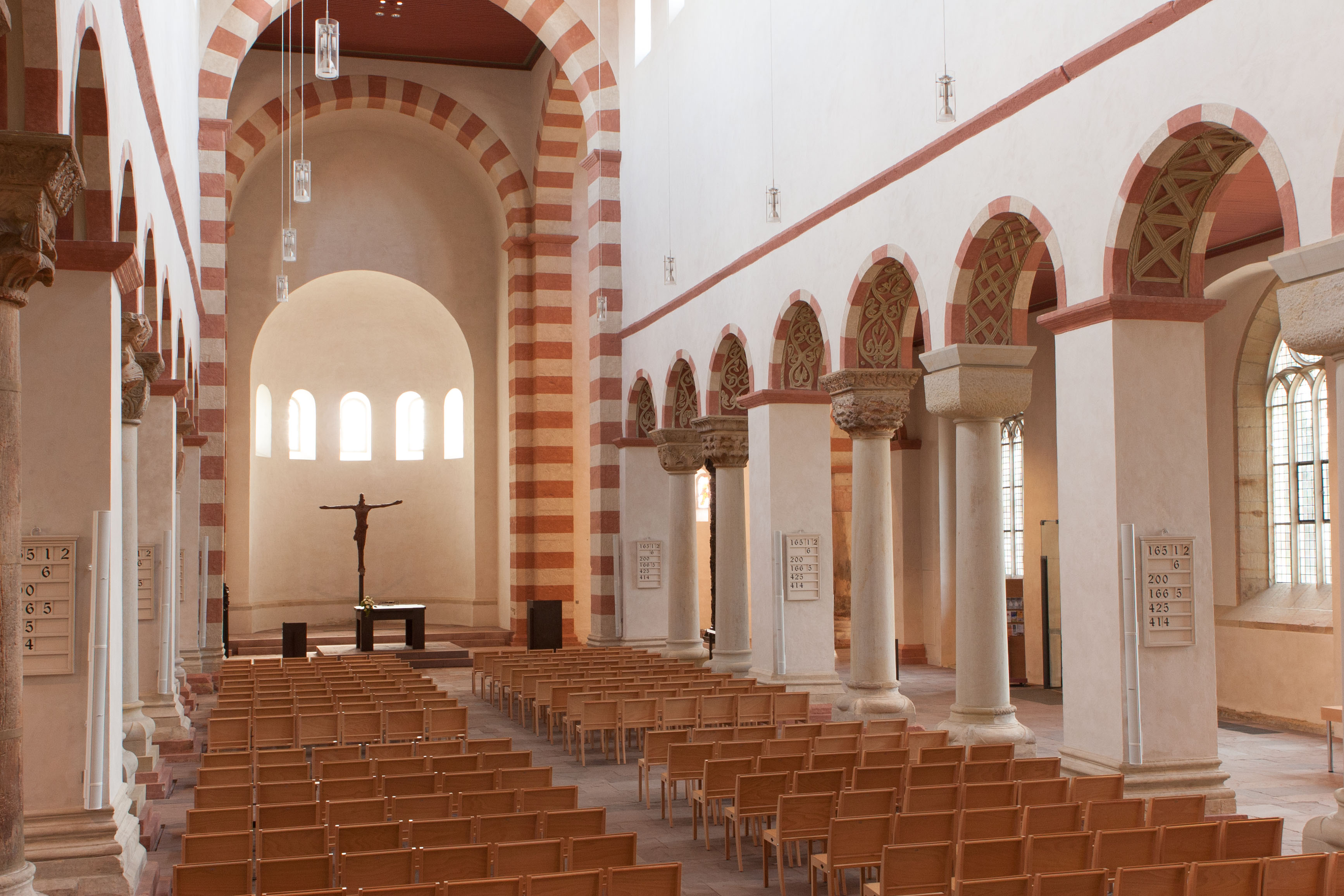
Interior of St. Michael's after the completion of the restoration carried out between 2005 and 2010

== Measurements ==
- Total length: 74.75 m
- Total length of the transepts: 40.01 m
- Total width of the transepts: 11.38 m
- Length of the crypt: 18.36 m
- Length of the nave: 27.34 m
- Width of the nave incl. lower aisles: 22.75 m
- Width of the nave without lower aisles: 8.60 m
- Height of the nave without lower aisles: 16.70 m
- Thickness of the walls: 1.63 m

== Location ==
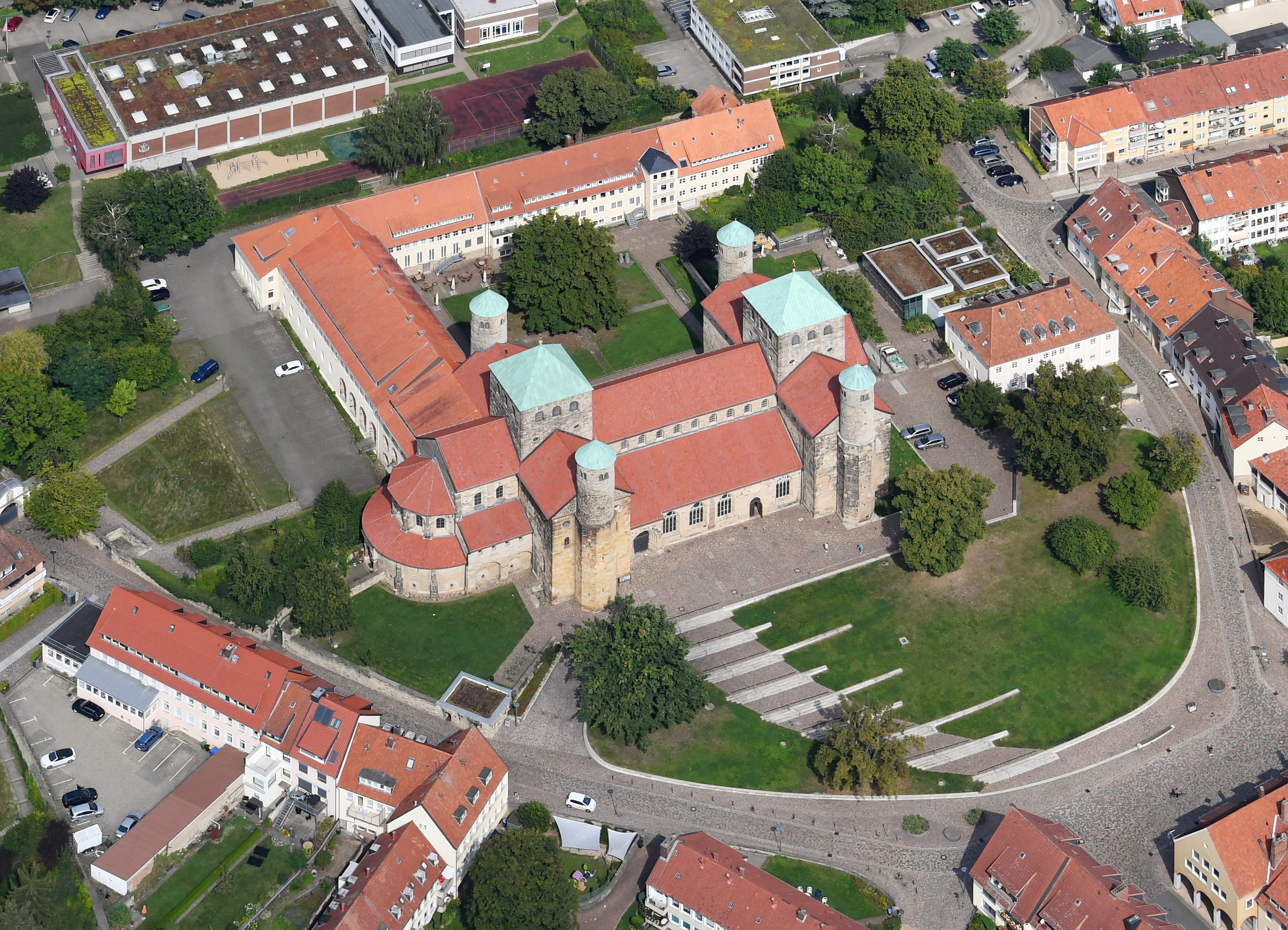
Aerial view of St. Michael's Church on the Michaelishügel

St. Michael's Church is situated at the Western rim of the city centre of Hildesheim, on the so-called Michaelishügel ("St. Michael's Hill"). The main entrance to the Church is on the south side. Magdalenengarten, a baroque park, is very close to the church in the west. The cloister is also accessible from there. It leads to the Church's contemporary (administrative) buildings. From the south and east of the Hill is Hildesheim's downtown, to the west is the River Innerste and in the north the Gymnasium Andreanum school.

== Burials ==
- Bernward of Hildesheim

== See also ==
- Bernward Column
- Saint Michael in the Catholic Church
