= Tomb of Bruno the Priest =

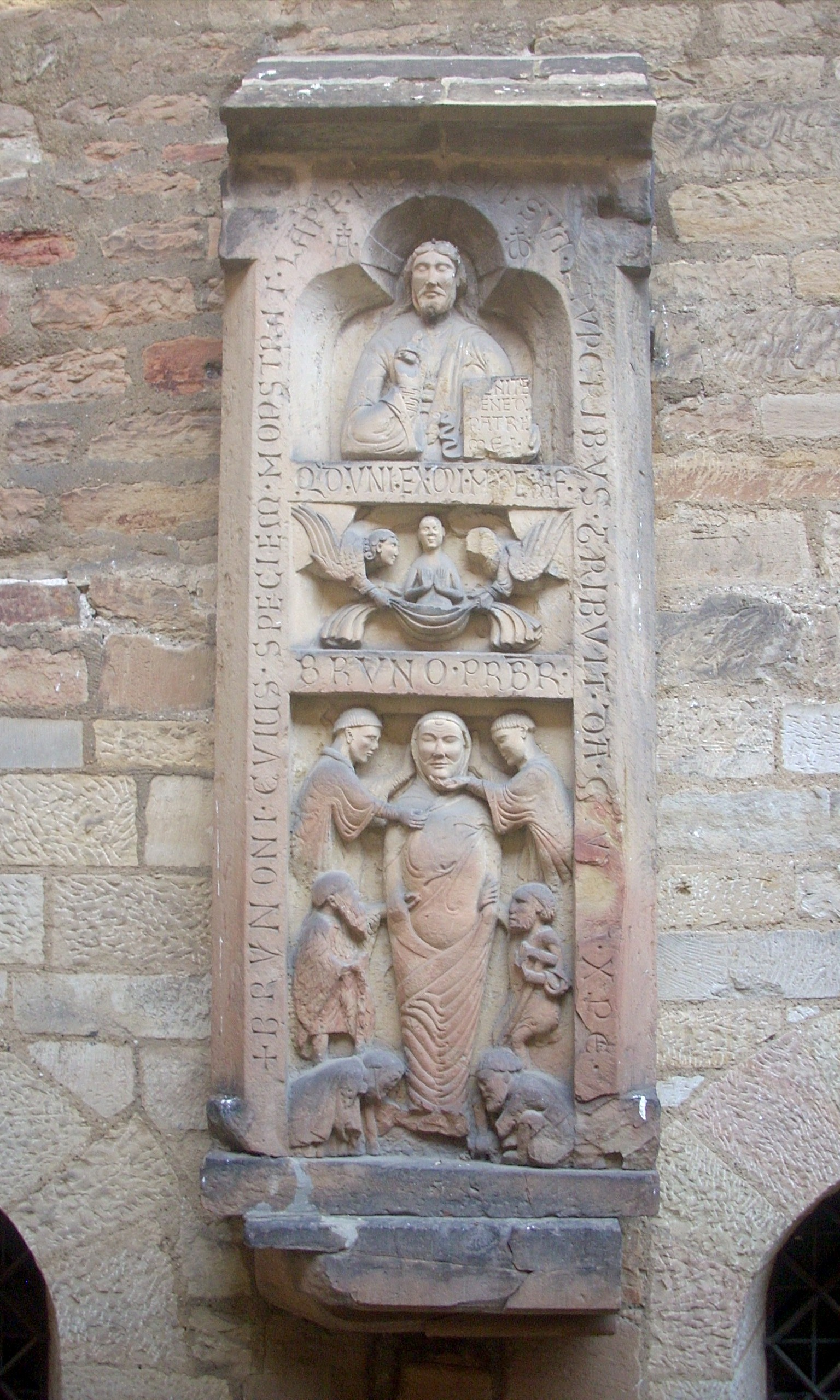
Tomb of Bruno the Priest at Hildesheim Cathedral

The Tomb of Bruno the Priest (German: Grabmal des Priesters Bruno) is grave monument, which is an outstanding example of Romanesque stonework and composition. It was set up after 1194 and is located on the south wall of the choir of Hildesheim Cathedral not far from the Thousand-year rose.

Bruno is found in the records as a member of the Hildesheim cathedral chapter in the role of steward and as a donor for the years 1181–1194. Nothing further is known of his life.

The more than two metre high grave plaque of unusual liveliness and vitality is divided into three scenes full of figures.

The bottom scene, which takes up about half of the plaque, shows the dead man, already wrapped in the funerary shroud with his eyes closed, but with a smile on his face. He is surrounded by six small people depicted in profile, who mourn him: two clerics affectionately lay him to rest, four penitents (including a woman) participate in the funeral, bowing and touching him out of gratitude and reverence. Above the scene is written BRVNO.PR[ES]B[YTE]R – "Bruno the Priest".

The middle scene shows the soul of the deceased in the form of a naked child with a blissful expression and hands opened forwards in adoration. He is borne away to Heaven in a piece of cloth by two angels floating on either side of him.

The upper scene shows Jesus Christ as judge and saviour, covered by a trefoil arch whose central arch forms his halo. Jesus welcomes the deceased with a gesture of blessing and speaks the words which can be read in the book in his left hand: VENITE BENED[ICTI] PATRIS MEI "Come, blessed by my father" (Mt. 25.34).

Further Latin inscriptions surround the images:

- Below Christ:
  QD.VNI.EX.MI.M.FE.MI.F
  (quod uni ex minimis meis fecistis, mihi fecistis) "What you have done to the least of my people, you have done to me" (Mt. 25,40).
- Surrounding the plaque (two rhyming hexameters):
  +BRVNONI.CVIVS.SPECIEM.MONSTRAT.LAPIS.ISTE
  QVI.SVA.PAVPERIBVS.TRIBVIT.DA GAVDIA.CHRISTE
  To Bruno, whose face this stone displays,
  who left his things to the poor, Christ give joy.

== Bibliography ==
- Christian Schuffels. Das Brunograbmal im Dom zu Hildesheim. Kunst und Geschichte einer romanischen Skulptur, Regensburg 2011, ISBN 978-3-7954-2255-4
- Christian Schuffels. "Das Grabmal des Presbyters Bruno im Hildesheimer Domkreuzgang", Göttinger Beiträge zur Kunstgeschichte Vol. 5, Münster 1997, ISBN 978-3-8258-2661-1
- Christian Schuffels. "Das Grabmal des Priesters Bruno – das steinerne Testament eines Hildesheimer Domherrn", in: Ego sum Hildensemensis. Bischof, Domkapitel und Dom in Hildesheim 815 bis 1810, edited by Ulrich Knapp, Petersberg 2000, pp. 321–330
- Adolf Bertram. Geschichte des Bisthums Hildesheim, Vol. 1, Hildesheim 1899, pp. 207f.
