= Wrisberg epitaph =

Painting by Johannes Hopffe

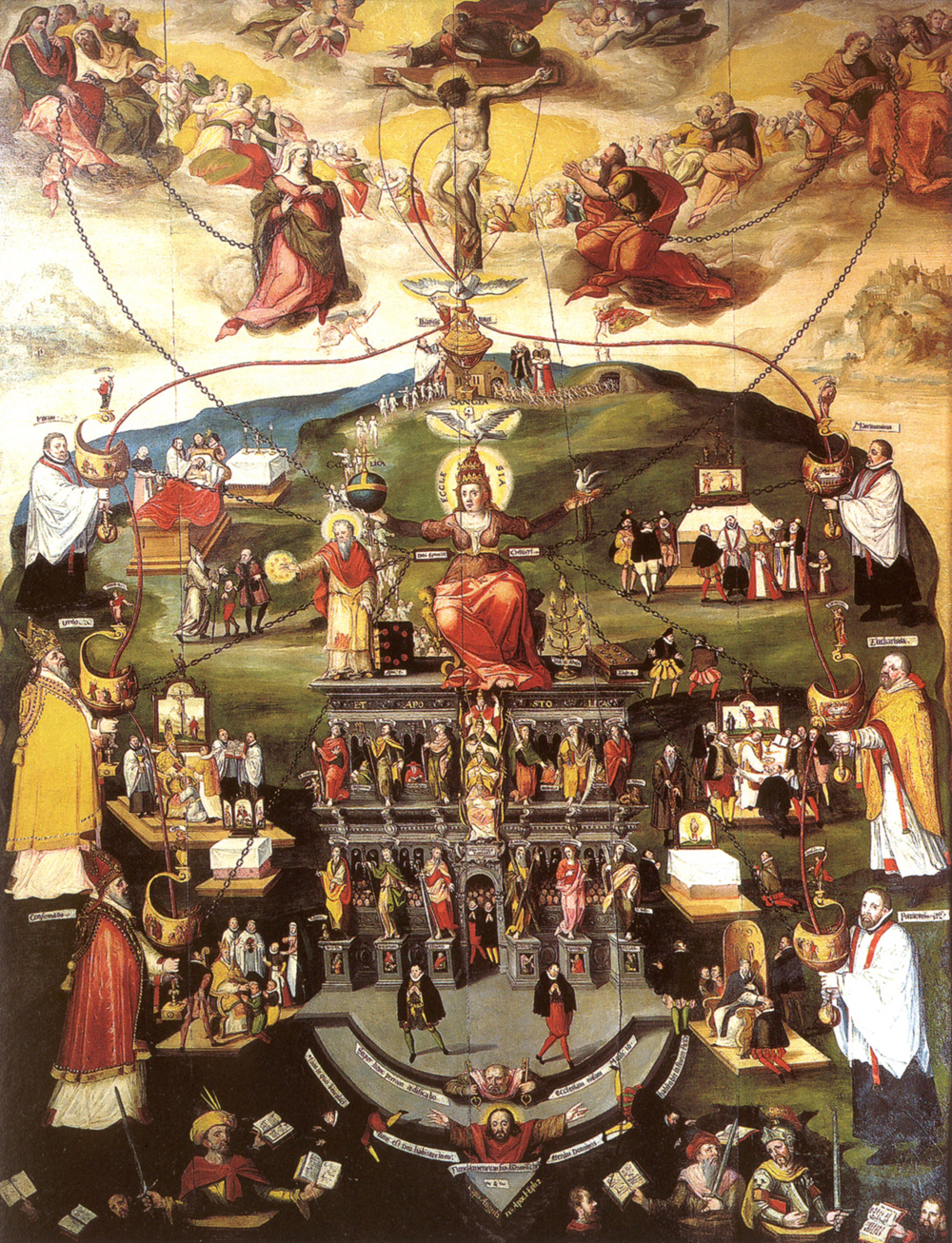
Central panel of the Wrisberg epitaph

The Wrisberg Epitaph is a triptych, which was created by the Hildesheim painter Johannes Hopffe († 1615) in 1585 as an epitaph for the Domherr Ernst von Wrisberg. The original frame did not survive. However, copies were created and subsequently hidden during the Second World War, the central one could be viewed in the south transept of Hildesheim Cathedral until January 2010. During the renovation of the cathedral (2010–2014) the three panels were on display in a reconstructed frame in the Weserrenaissance-Museum in Schloss Brake, Lemgo.

== Style and description ==
The three large panels in the Mannerist style have the same format. The outer panels show the Nativity and Resurrection of Christ, drawing on models from the Italian Renaissance.

The most novel portion is the central panel. This serves as a painted catechism of the Catholic reform. The renewed Catholic ecclesiology and sacramental doctrine of the Council of Trent are displayed in the tone of the Counter-Reformation. The painting shows the heavenly realm of God and the saints and the contemporary, mundane world in two levels, which are both separated and linked. The connection follows the central axis. Grace flows from the wounds of the crucified Jesus, as the second person of the Trinity (between God the Father and the Holy Spirit), into a baptismal font and the other sacraments and through them to humanity. In the centre, a woman in red wearing a papal tiara is enthroned as a personification of the Church on a magnificent Renaissance monument. A long line of people emerge from a hole in the background, enter a baptismal building and leave it dressed in white, set on the way to the palace of the church. From there they split into individuals dressed as laypeople, who receive the sacraments in their various types of life, and those who leave the bosom of the church and sink into the ground at the bottom of the picture.

There are six sacraments beyond the "entrance way" of baptism, dispensed by giant figures,

At left:

- Anointing of the Sick (Priest in rochett and stole),
- Holy orders (Bishop in golden cope),
- Confirmation (Bishop in red cope),

At right:

- Marriage (Priest in rochett and stole)
- Eucharist (Priest in chasuble)
- Penance (Priest in rochett and stole).

The heavenly and earthly churches as well as the church and the sacraments are bound together with iron chains.
