= Inkpot Madonna =

1430 wooden statue of mary

- Tintenfassmadonna (German)
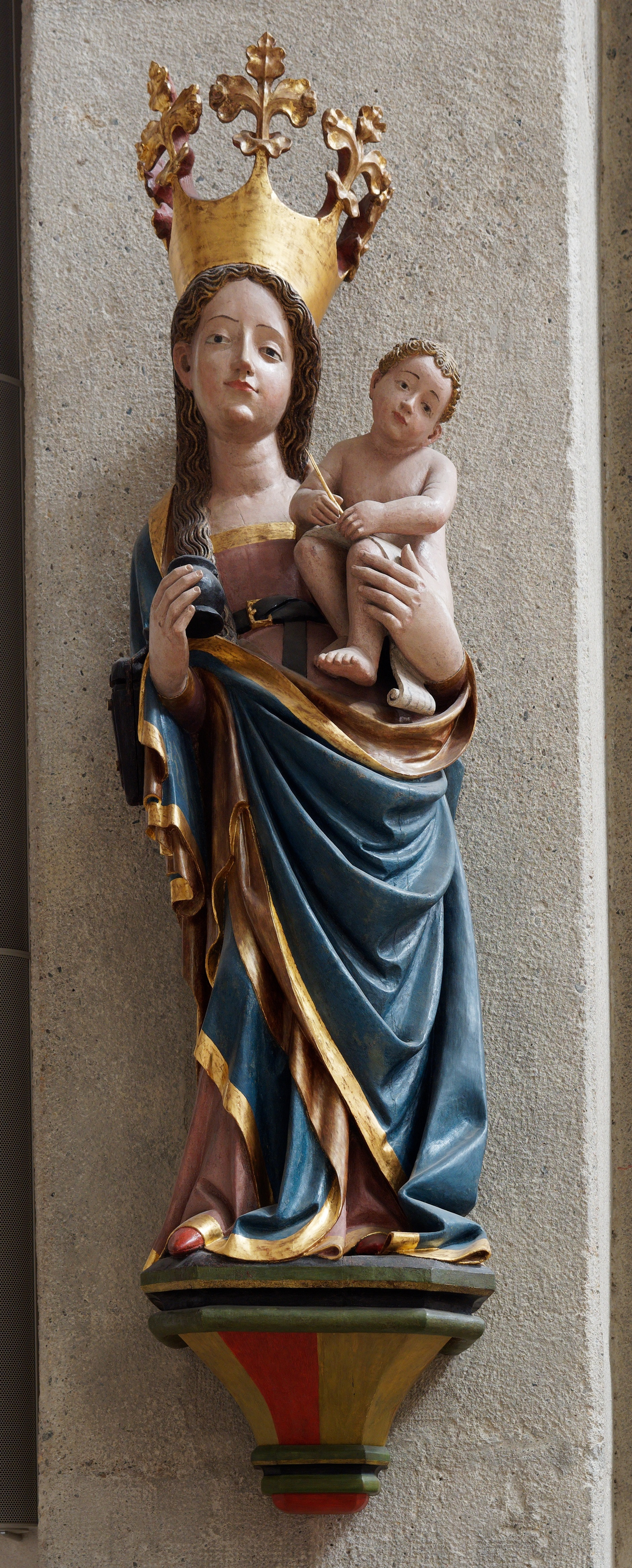
- Artist: anonymous
- Year: c. 1430
- Type: Wood sculpture
- Dimensions: 180 cm (71 in)
- Location: Hildesheim Cathedral; Hildesheim, Germany; 52°08′56″N 9°56′47″E

The Inkpot Madonna (German: Tintenfassmadonna) is a late-Gothic sculpture of Mary in the Hildesheim Cathedral, a building on the UNESCO World Cultural Heritage list since 1985, which is consecrated to the Assumption of Mary. The coloured life-size wooden statue was created around 1430, probably in Lower Saxony, and has the hallmarks of the international Gothic style: a tender face, loose posture and flowing drapery.

== Description ==
The sculpture, made of oak, is 1.8 metres (5.9 ft) tall. Mary is depicted wearing a sumptuous blue garment with gold edging, gathered over her right shoulder. Underneath she wears a white underdress. There is a tall golden crown with five heraldic fleurs-de-lis on her head, which are interpreted as a symbol of the Trinity. The naked Baby Jesus is held in her left arm. He bends away from his mother, looking towards the viewer.

The significance of the statue is its theme of writing: the child holds a quill in his right hand and on his knee he has a scroll, which unfurls down to his feet. In her right hand his mother holds his inkpot, from which the sculpture gets its name. The writing baby on his mother's arm is not a biblical motif, but the "learning Jesus" appeared in Medieval art in the Middle Ages. It is natural to think of the Book of Life in which the names of the saved are inscribed by Jesus. Mary, therefore, is shown to have contributed by providing the "material" for this saving work. The inkpot might also indicate that the Baby was already full of wisdom.

== Location ==
The Inkpot Madonna was originally located in the chapter house of the Hildesheim cathedral chapter. Later it was moved to the church on the southwestern pillar of the crossing of the cathedral, as the most prominent image of the Mother of God in the cathedral.

In 2010 the sculpture was moved to the Niedersächsisches Landesmuseum Hannover, while the cathedral was being renovated. From October 2012 it was restored in the workshop of the Klosterkammer Hannover by Roksana Jachim. Investigation with computer tomography revealed problems with the wood and the coats of paint. After the restoration of both the sculpture and the cathedral, the sculpture was returned on 15 August 2014 to a prominent location in the cathedral, on the opposite pillar of the crossing.
