= Hildesheim Cathedral =

- The Cathedral of the Assumption of Mary
- Hildesheimer Dom
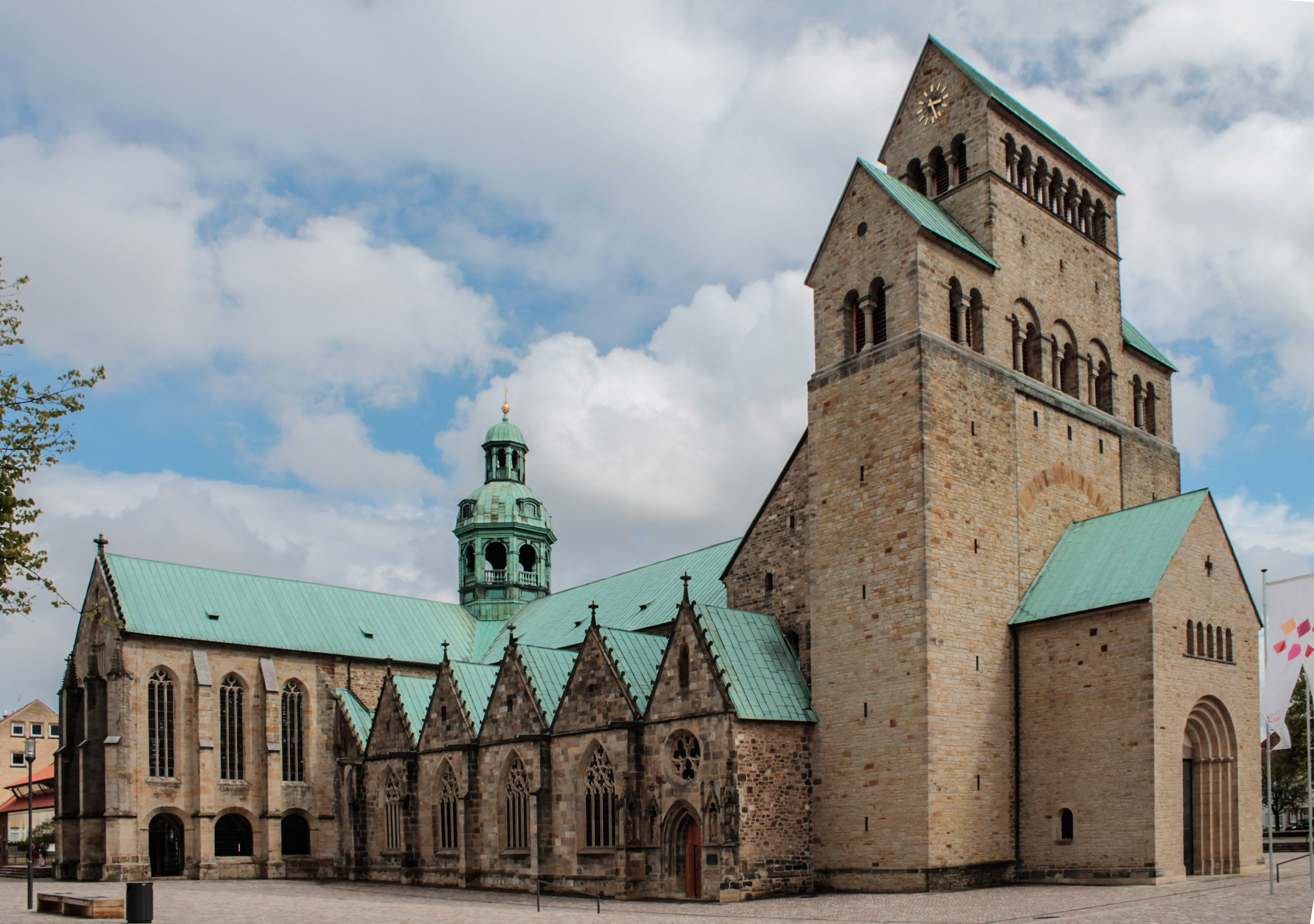
- Northwest view of Hildesheim Cathedral
- Hildesheim Cathedral
- 52°08′56″N 9°56′50″E
- Location: Hildesheim
- Country: Germany
- Denomination: Roman Catholic
- Website: www.dom-hildesheim.de

History
- Status: Active
- Dedication: Assumption of Mary

Architecture
- Functional status: Cathedral
- Architectural type: basilica
- Style: Romanesque (original); Gothic (side chapels and northern paradise); Baroque (crossing tower)
- Groundbreaking: 815 (Chapel of St. Mary); 872 (St. Mary's Cathedral)

Specifications
- Length: 80 m (262 ft 6 in)
- Width: 44 m (144 ft 4 in)
- Height: 20 m (65 ft 7 in)

Administration
- Diocese: Diocese of Hildesheim

UNESCO World Heritage Site
- Official name: St Mary's Cathedral
- Part of: St Mary's Cathedral and St Michael's Church at Hildesheim
- Criteria: Cultural: (i), (ii), (iii)
- Reference: 187bis-001
- Inscription: 1985 (9th Session)
- Extensions: 2008
- Area: 0.58 ha (1.4 acres)
- Buffer zone: 157.68 ha (389.6 acres)

Hildesheim Cathedral (German: Hildesheimer Dom), officially the Cathedral of the Assumption of Mary (German: Hohe Domkirche St. Mariä Himmelfahrt) or simply St. Mary's Cathedral (German: Mariendom), is a medieval Roman Catholic cathedral in the city centre of Hildesheim in Lower Saxony, Germany, that serves as the seat of the Diocese of Hildesheim. The cathedral has been on the UNESCO World Cultural Heritage list since 1985, together with the nearby St. Michael's Church because of its unique art and outstanding Romanesque architecture.

The cathedral church was built between 1010 and 1020 in the Romanesque style. It follows a symmetrical plan with two apses, that is characteristic of Ottonian Romanesque architecture in Old Saxony. The cathedral's treasures include world-famous artworks, bronze works from the time of Bishop Bernward, Bernward Doors and Bernward Column, as well as two of the four notable Romanesque wheel chandeliers: the Hezilo chandelier and the Azelin chandelier.

After renovations and extensions in the 11th, 12th and 14th centuries, the cathedral was completely destroyed during an air raid on 22 March 1945 and rebuilt from 1950 to 1960. A thorough renovation of the cathedral began in 2010, including technical and conservation measures. Some of the cathedral's treasures have been shown further afield, including at an exhibition at New York's Metropolitan Museum of Art. The cathedral was reopened on 15 August 2014.

== History ==
=== Construction ===
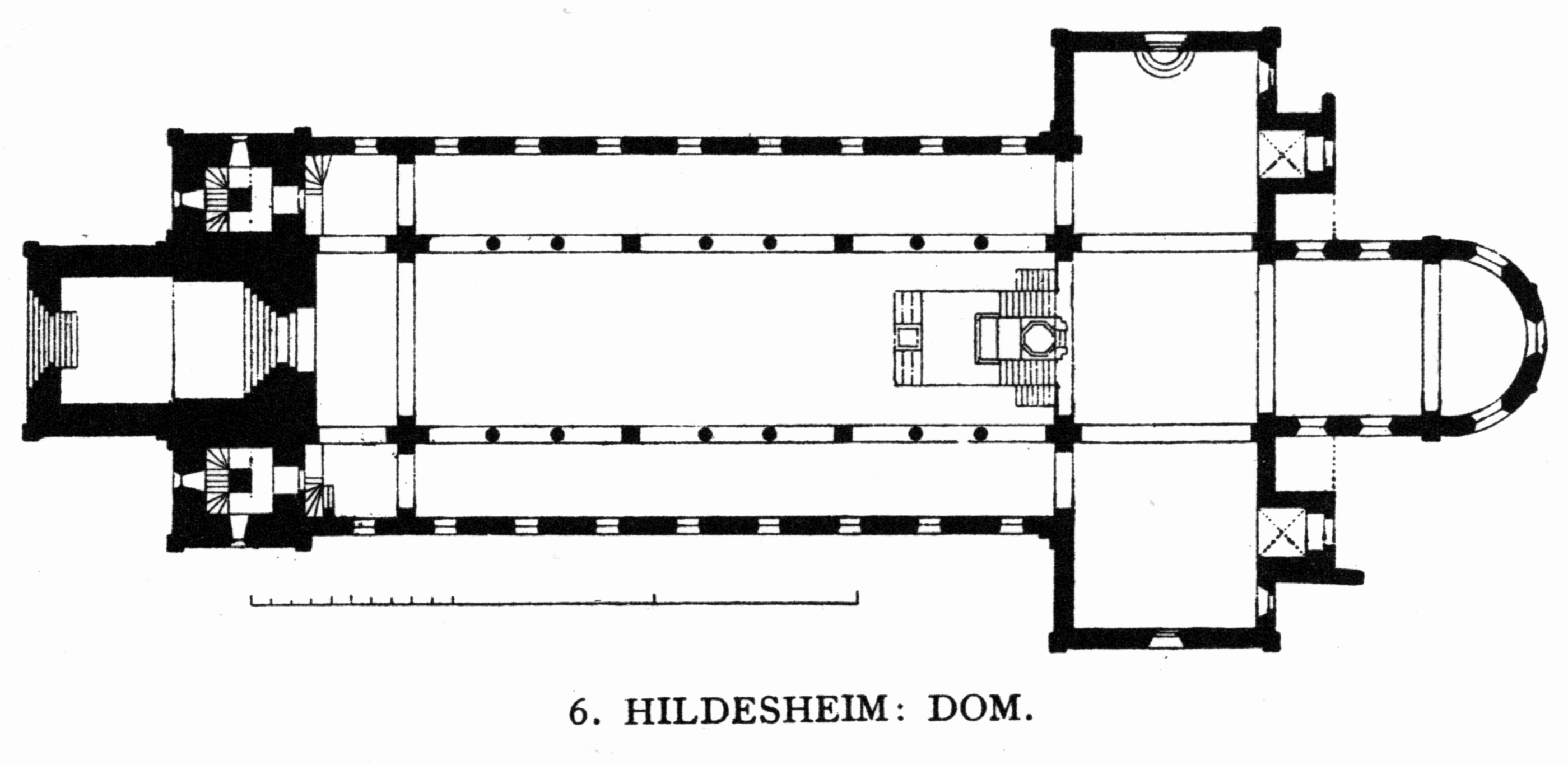
Groundplan

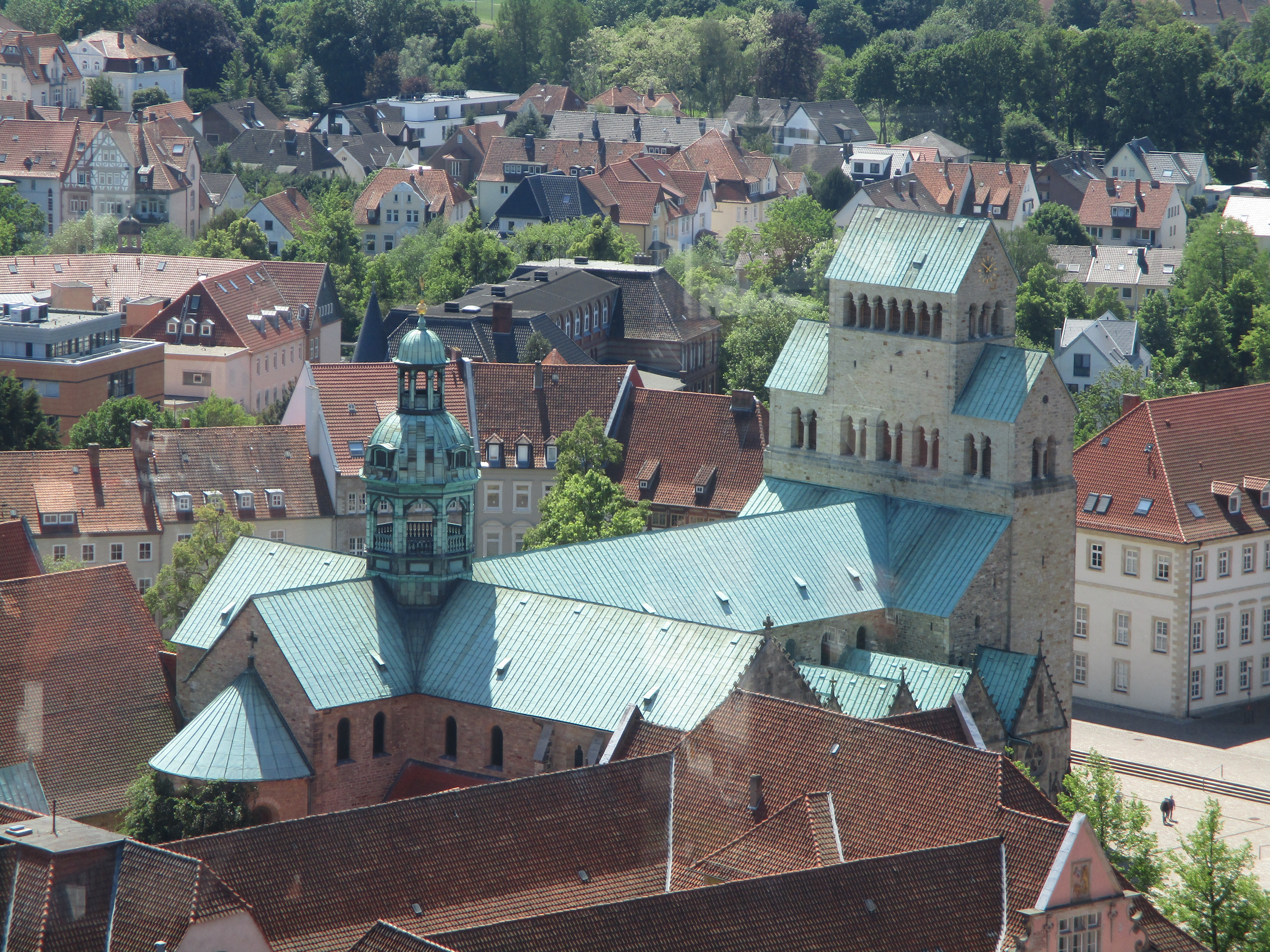
Aerial view from the tower of St. Andreas

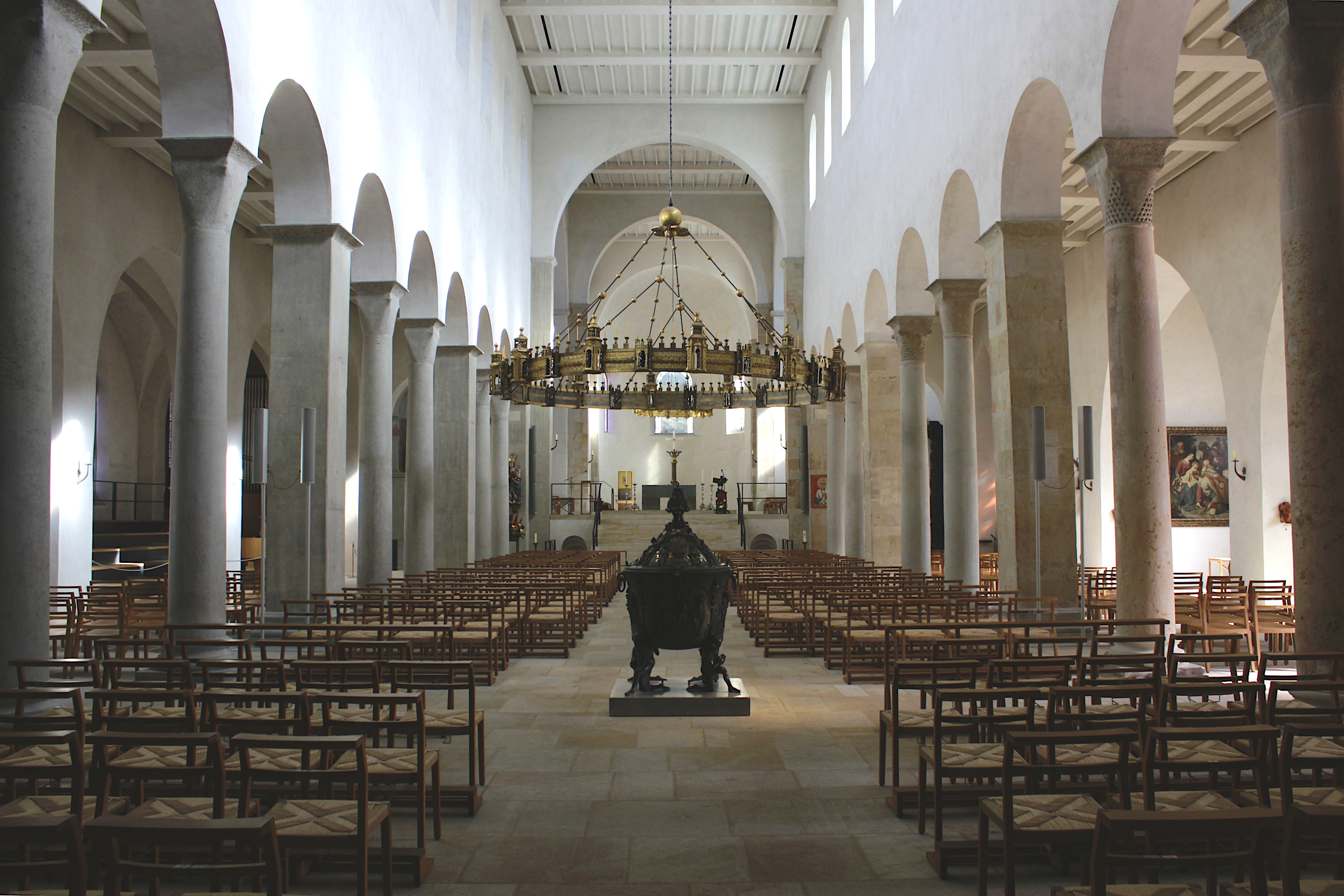
Interior

After the establishment of the Diocese of Hildesheim in 815 by Louis the Pious, a Chapel of St. Mary was built on the locations of the modern apse. Bishop Gunthar of Hildesheim, who was in office from 815 to 834, had a small basilica with two round towers built immediately to the south of the chapel, which he dedicated to Saint Cecilia. This served as the original cathedral and Stift church. The first four bishops were buried there. Only traces of the foundations of these two buildings remain. An older Hildesheim parish church probably once stood on the site of the Chapel of Saint Stephen next to the gatehouse at the eastern entrance to the chapel of St. Hellweg, which might date back to Hildegrim of Châlons and his expedition to East Saxony.

The cathedral was built in 872 under Bishop Altfrid as a cruciform three-aisled basilica with a two-story westwork. It is an example of Ottonian architecture, with alternating column support and semi circular apses completing the naves. The building suffered severe fire damage in 1046. Bishop Azelin planned to erect a new, larger building further to the west and to extend the nave. His successor, Hezilo of Hildesheim, abandoned this plan and instead built on the old foundations, incorporating the surviving walls into the new building. Further important renovations occurred up to the end of the fourteenth century but did not deviate from the ground plan of Bishop Altfrid's basilica. The northern paradise and the north and south side chapels date from the gothic period and the tower above the crossing from the baroque period. In the nineteenth century, the original westwork was replaced by a Neo-Romanesque two-tower facade, which stood until 1945.

=== School and library ===
Hildesheim Cathedral School (Hildesheimer Domschule), which had rooms in the cloisters, was one of the most significant educational institutions of the Ottonian and Salian periods. Its library has served as the cathedral's library (German: Dombibliothek Hildesheim) since 815; it is the oldest library in Northern Germany.

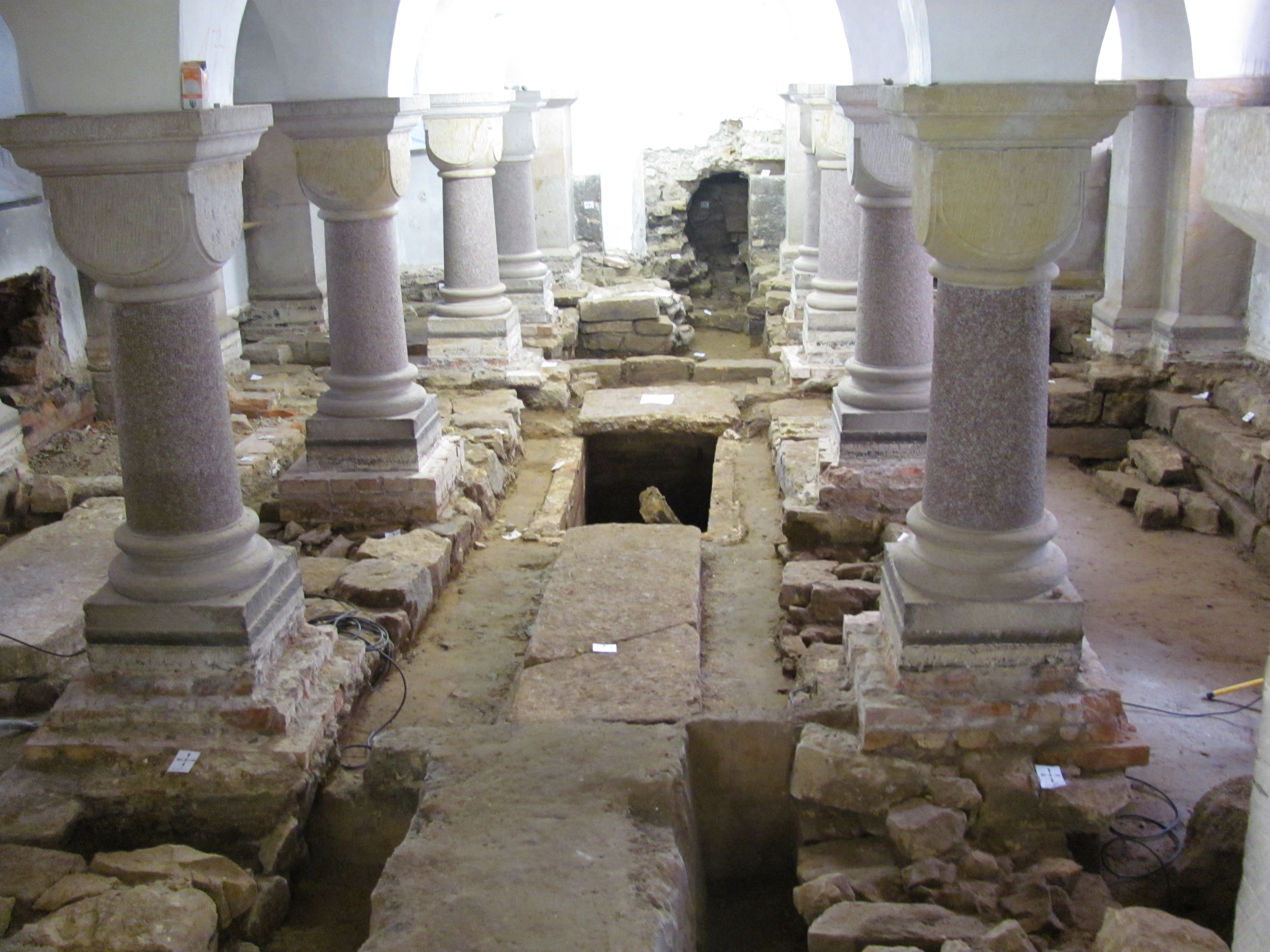
Foundation of the first cathedral under the crypt dating from 815

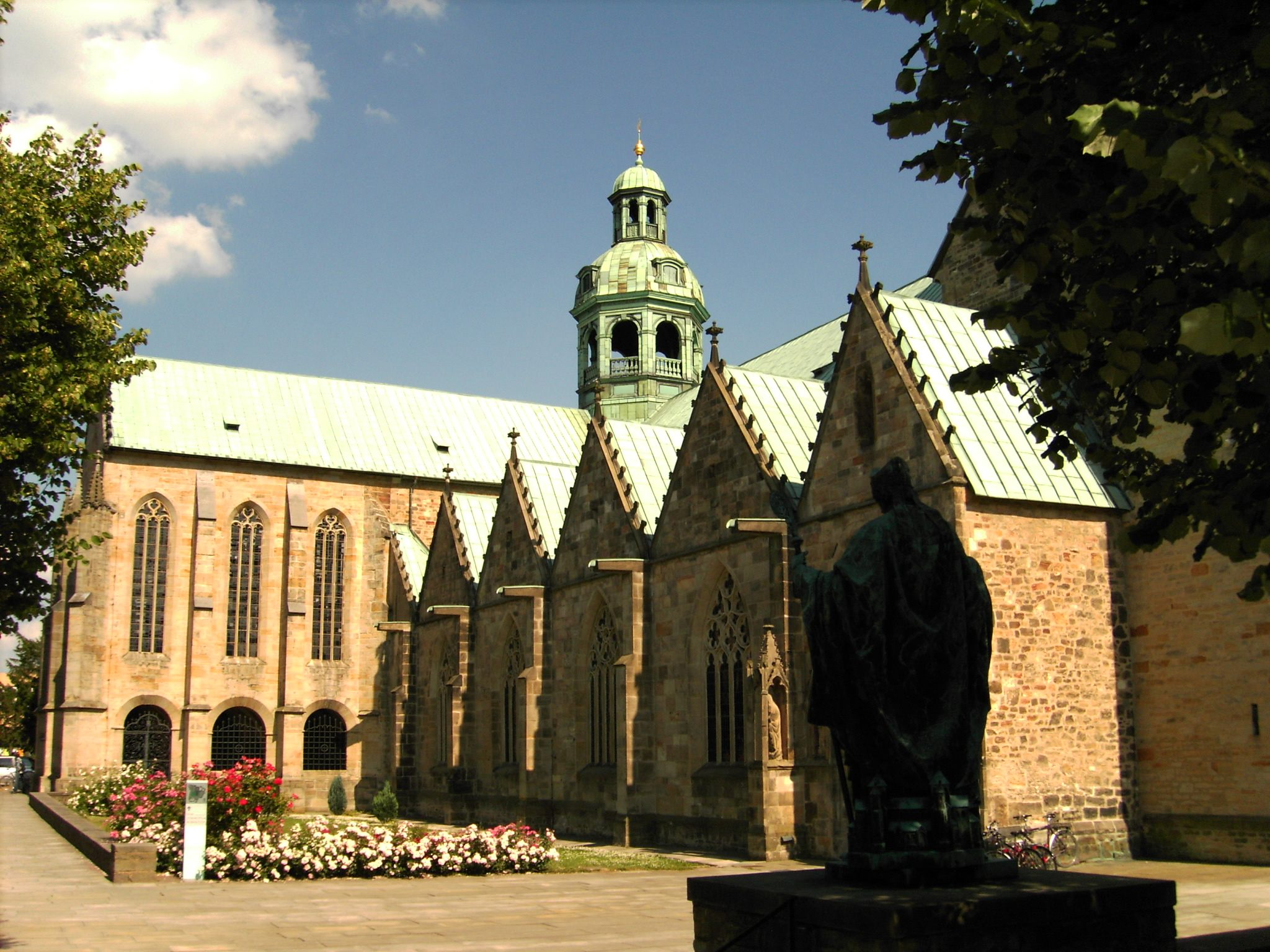
Crossing and northern side chapels

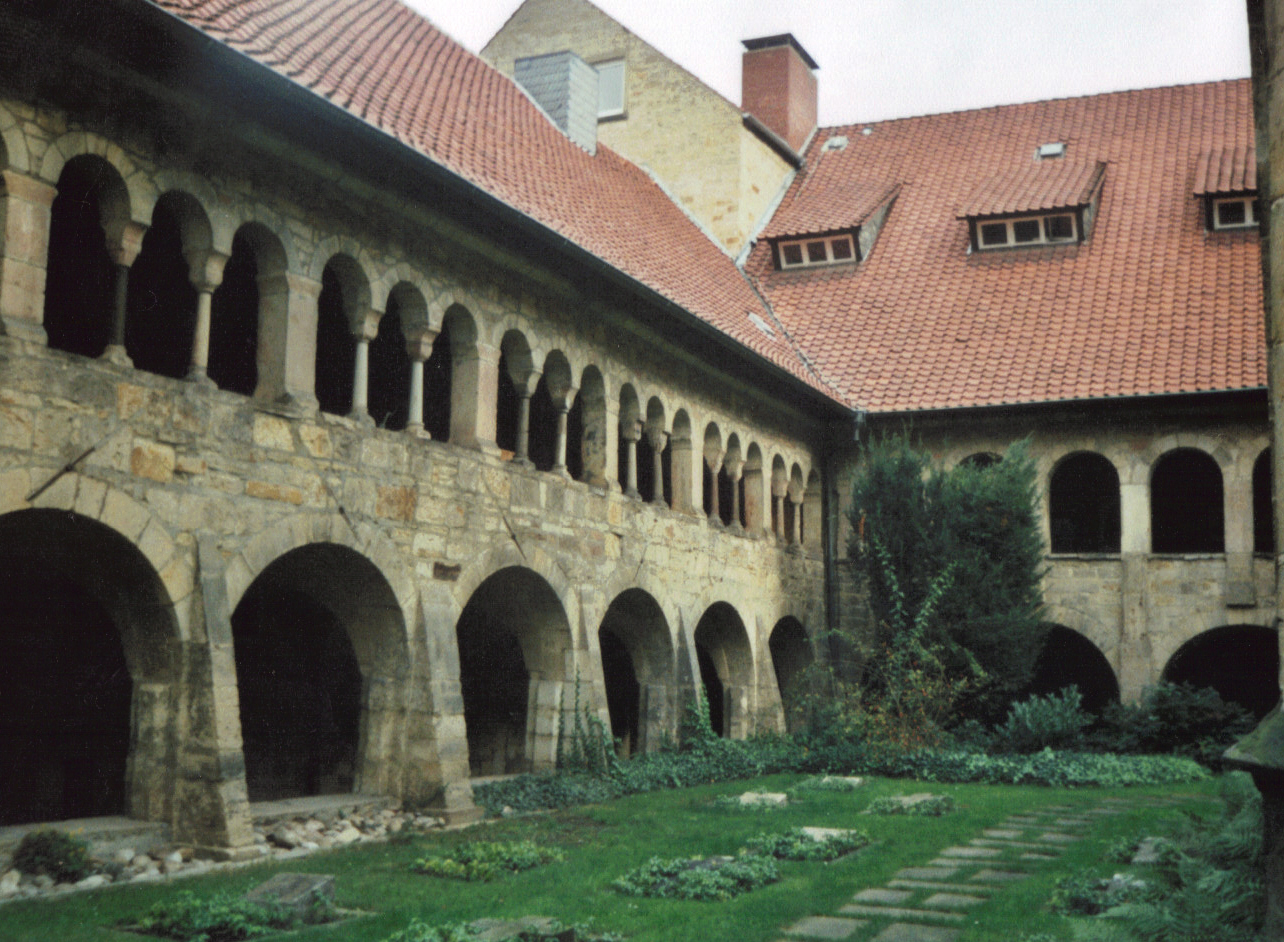
Cloister, built from 1060 to 1070

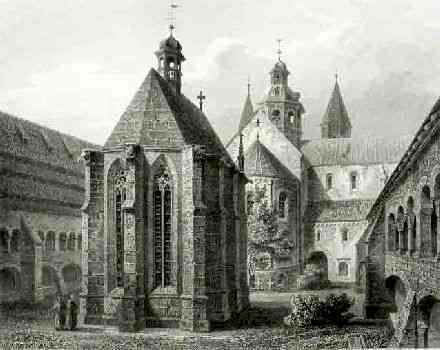
Cloister with St. Anne's Chapel, c. 1845

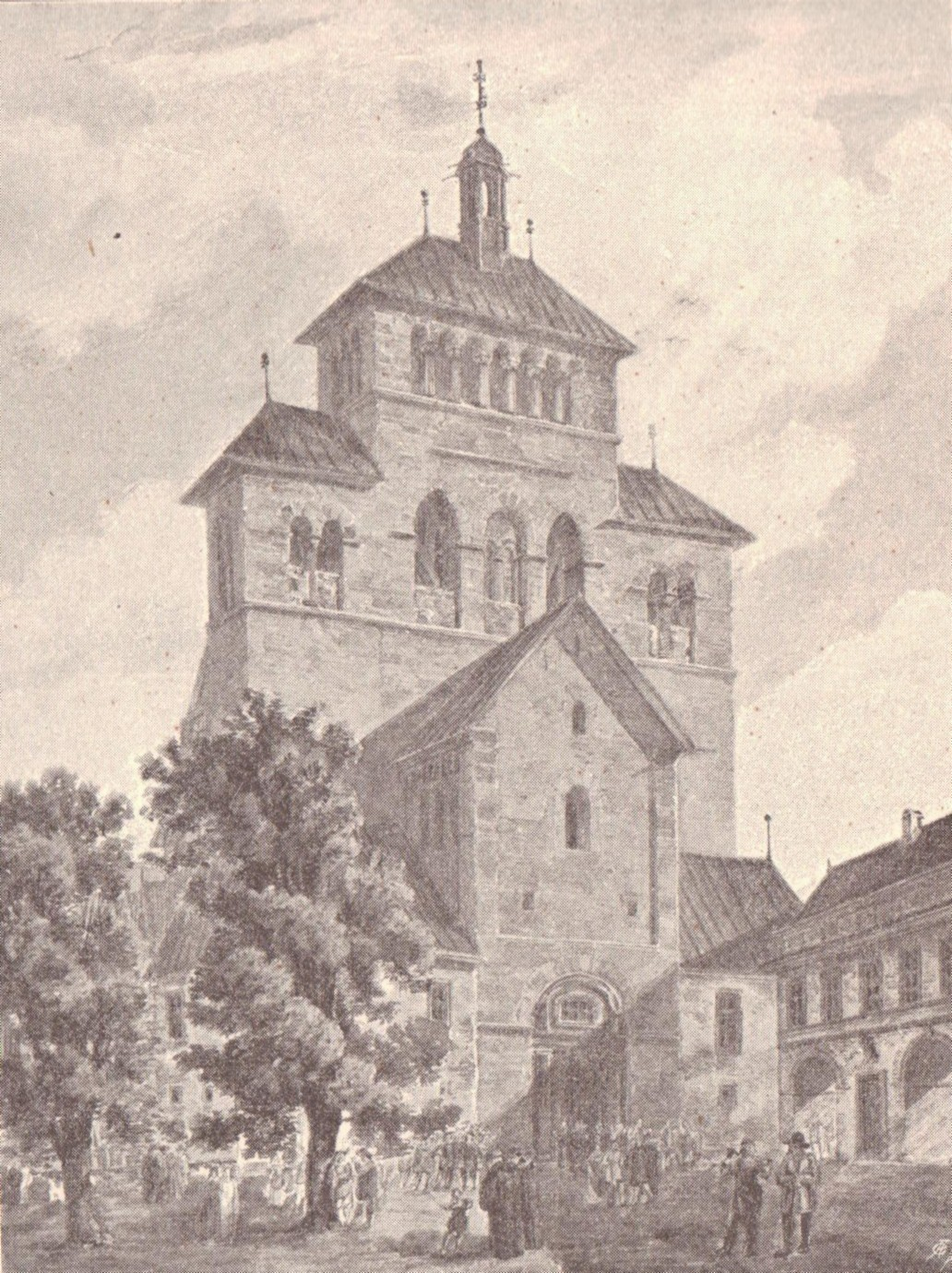
Westwork before 1840

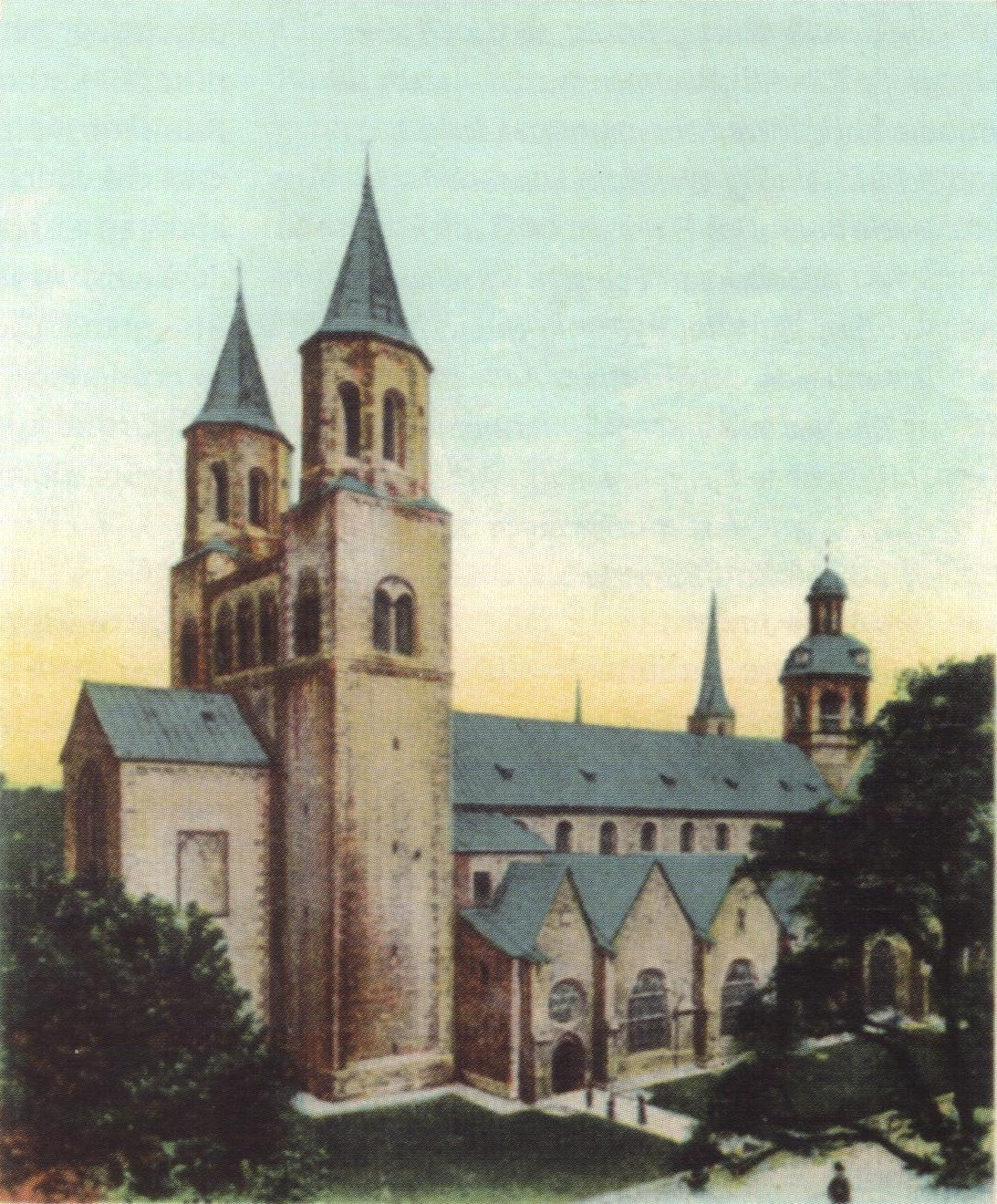
Neo-Romanesque westwork, 1890

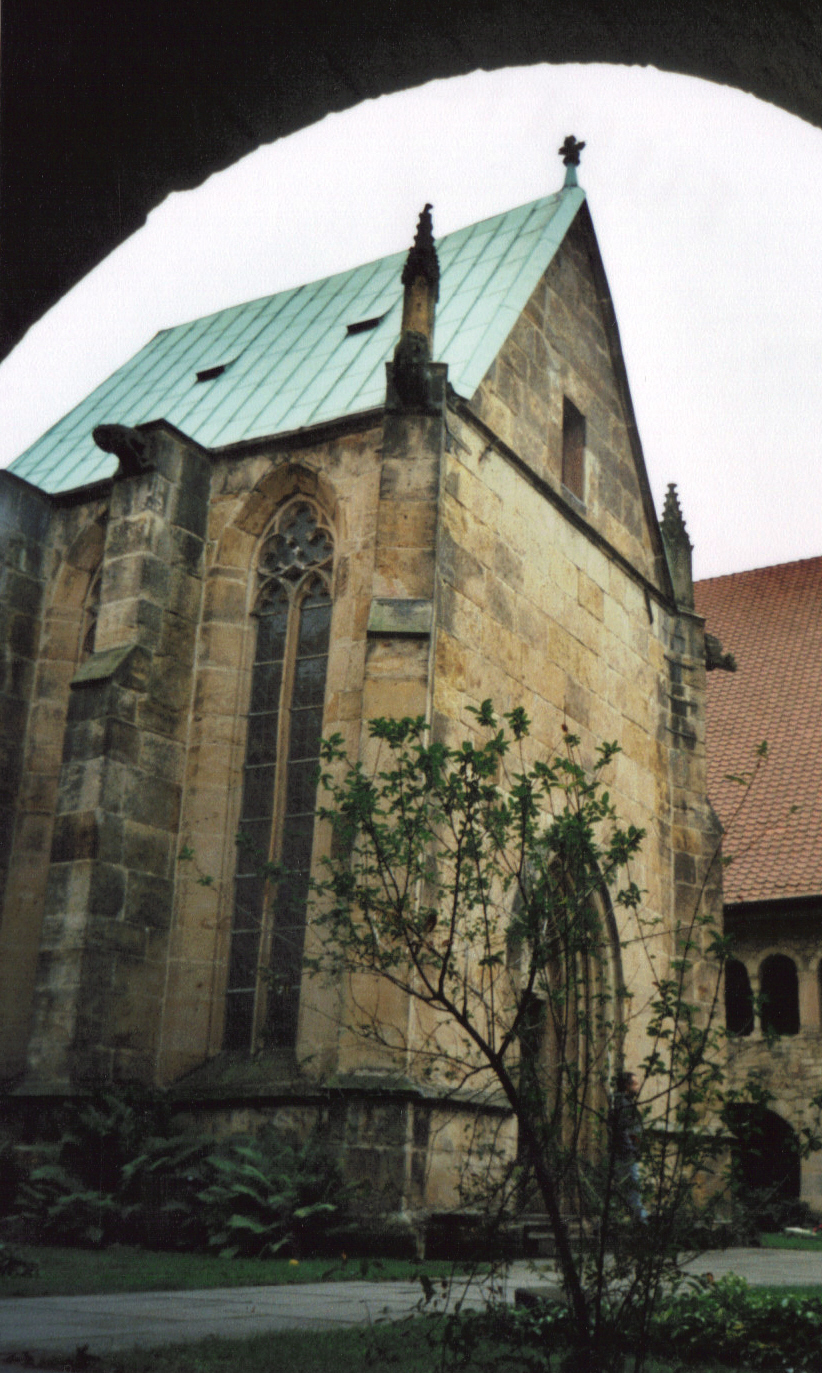
Anne's chapel

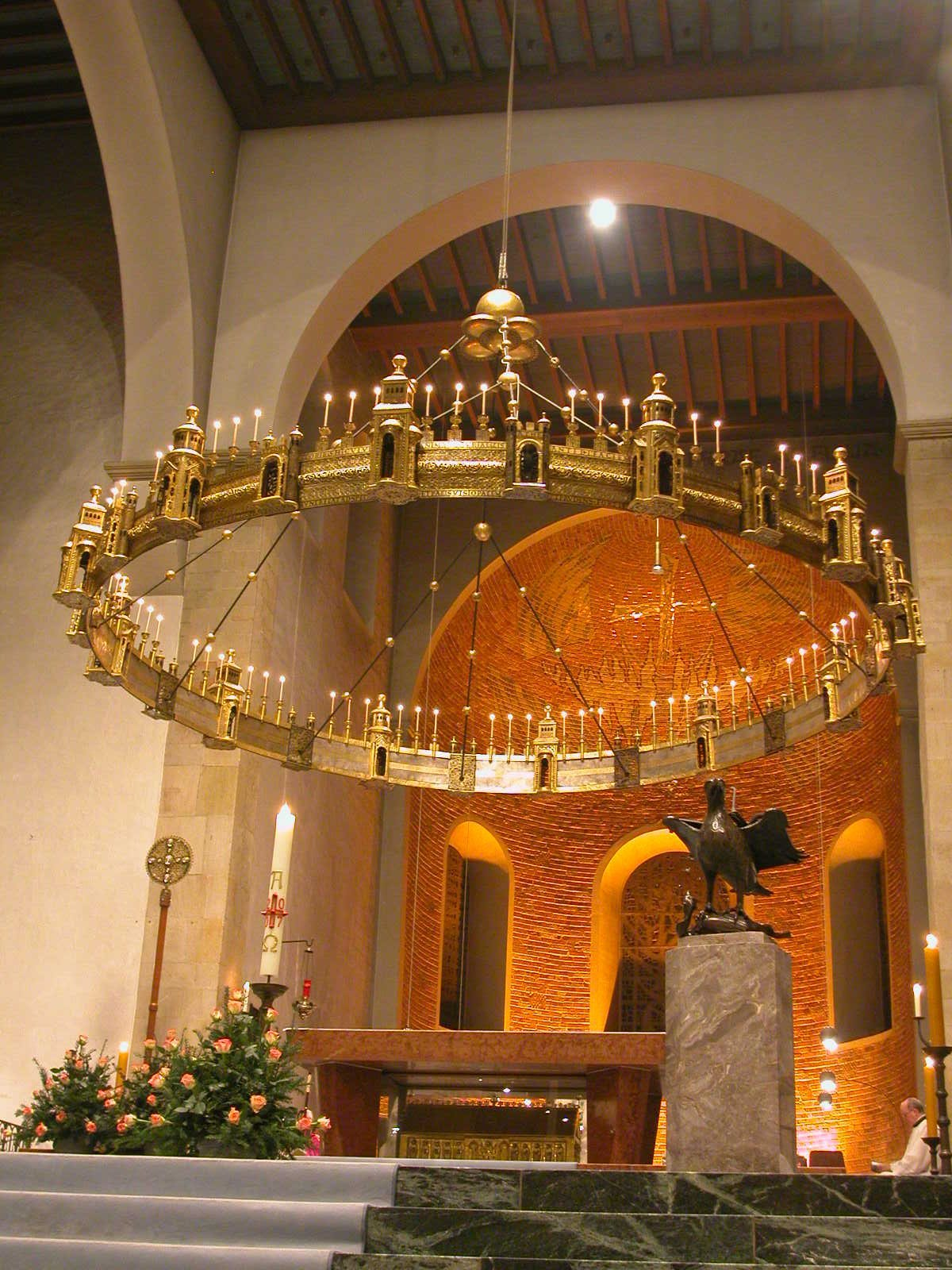
Hezilo chandelier in the crossing, 2009

=== Destruction in the Second World War ===
During the aerial bombardment of Hildesheim by the RAF and RCAF in World War II, the main building was almost entirely destroyed; only the westwork and the outer walls survived. Of the ancillary buildings, only the Gothic Anne's chapel (Annenkapelle), erected in 1321 in the middle of the cathedral's courtyard, was mostly undamaged. It was the only cathedral in Germany that had to be newly consecrated after its reconstruction, on 27 March 1960 by Bishop Heinrich Maria Janssen.

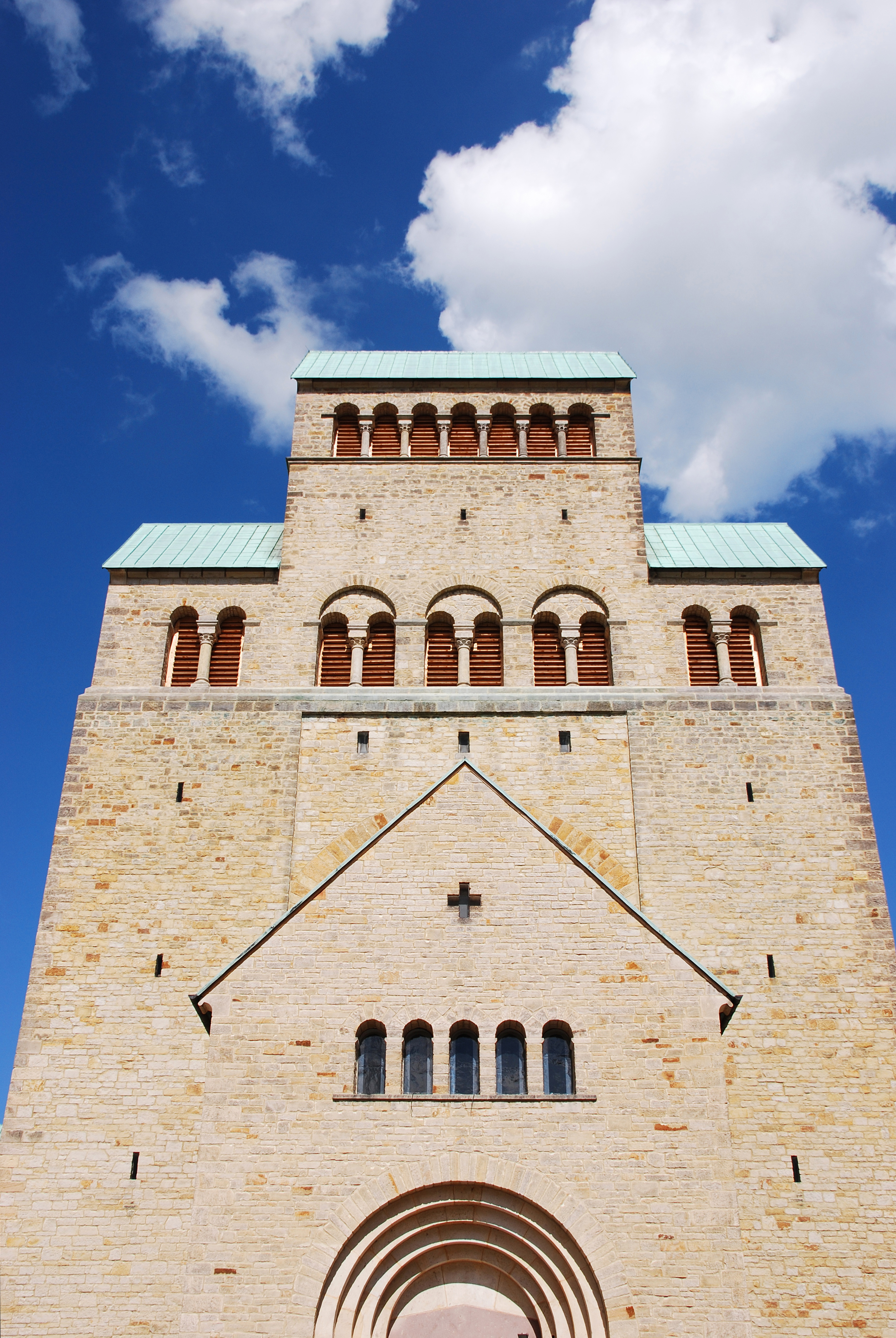
Westwork

The building was rebuilt between 1950 and 1960 in a simplified form. The baroque elements were abandoned in favour of a form which took its cue from the early Romanesque style. The most visible aspect of this on the exterior was that upper stories, and side towers added to the westwork in 1840, were not restored. The westwork was reconstructed closer to its earlier state based on the model of the westwork of Minden Cathedral, which had also been severely damaged by wartime bombing. In addition, the gatehouse in front of the westwork was reduced by about half. Otherwise, the exterior appeared as it had done before the destruction – in particular, the baroque crossing-tower was rebuilt.

The reconstruction was carried out under tight constraints. Because of the lack of sandstone tiles, the floor was relaid in marble. The roofs of the nave, transept, and cloisters were cast in concrete and covered with wooden boards on the inside to recall the appearance of ceiling beams. The interior walls, as well as the walls of the nave, were rebuilt in brick and limestone, hidden from view by a dimension stone coating on the outside and by a coat of smooth plaster on the inside. The ground level was raised by 60 cm, which resulted in the rooms having a squat appearance, especially in the transepts. The columns of the nave were cast in concrete, and the pilasters were coated in sandstone.

The reconsecration took until 1960 to complete because of various problems, chiefly the "Hildesheim Cathedral construction dispute" (Hildesheimer Dombaustreit), an argument between the Diocese of Hildesheim and the Land of Lower Saxony about the cost of the reconstruction and particularly about whether Lower Saxony was one of the legal successors of the Free State of Prussia which had undertaken to cover the cathedral's building expenses in 1803 (when it was still the Kingdom of Prussia) during the process of German mediatization. The parties reached a settlement in 1957.

=== Renovations 2010–2014 ===
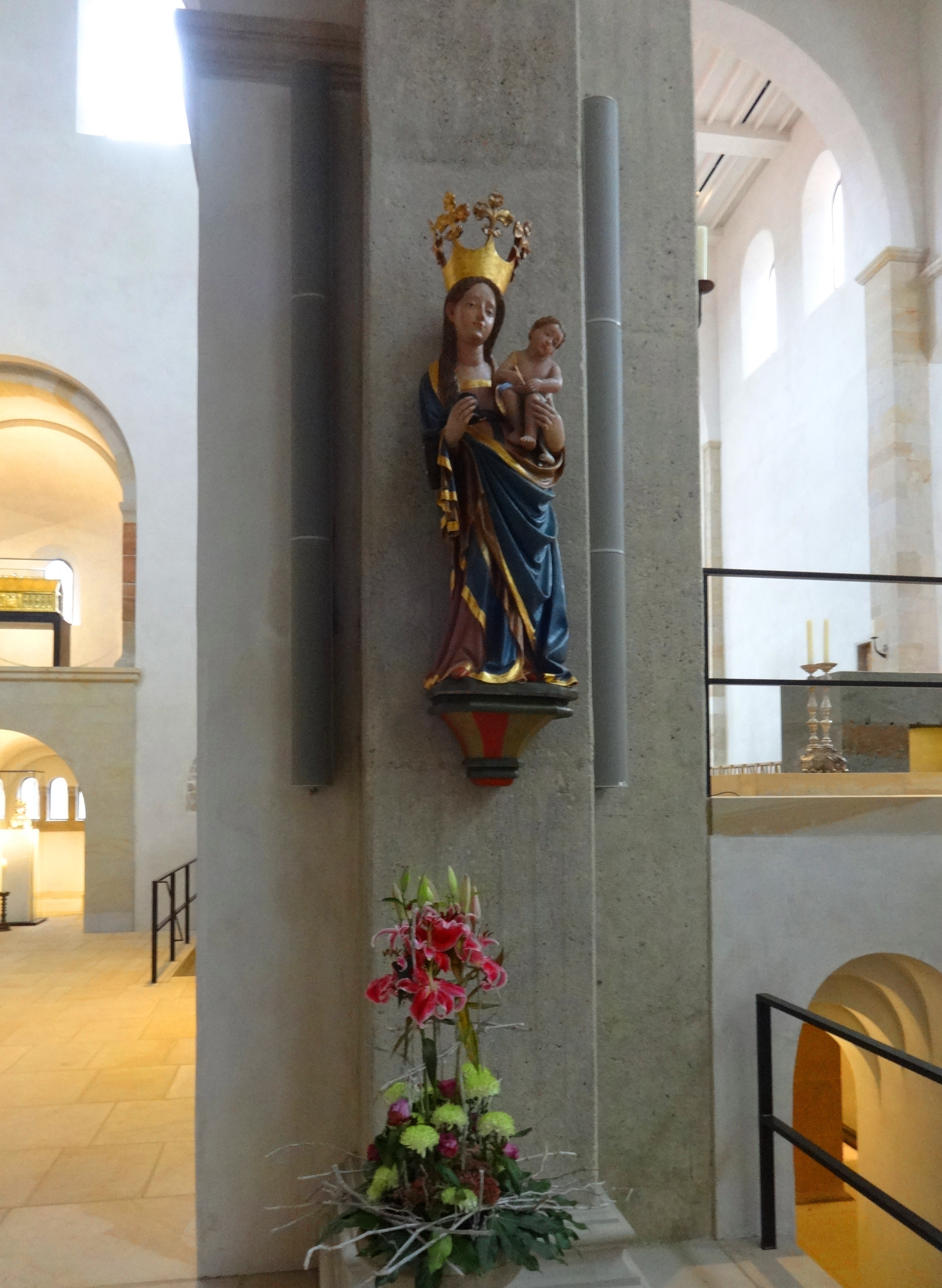
The Inkpot Madonna

After many years of planning, a thorough renovation of the cathedral began in January 2010, the first since 1960. Along with technical and conservation measures, there were alterations to the design. The floor was lowered to the original level, the Hezilo and Azelin chandeliers were restored to their places in the nave and the high choir, and Bernward Doors were again mounted facing outwards, behind an antechamber, as originally intended. In addition, a bishop's crypt was created.

On 10 January 2010, the cathedral was closed for the work to begin. During the reconstruction, the basilica of St. Godehard served as the bishop's church (cathedra), as it had in the postwar years. The cathedral renovation was the largest church construction project in Germany. The solemn reopening of the cathedral was on 15 August 2014, coinciding with the beginning of the Diocese's 1200 year jubilee.

=== Thousand-year Rose ===
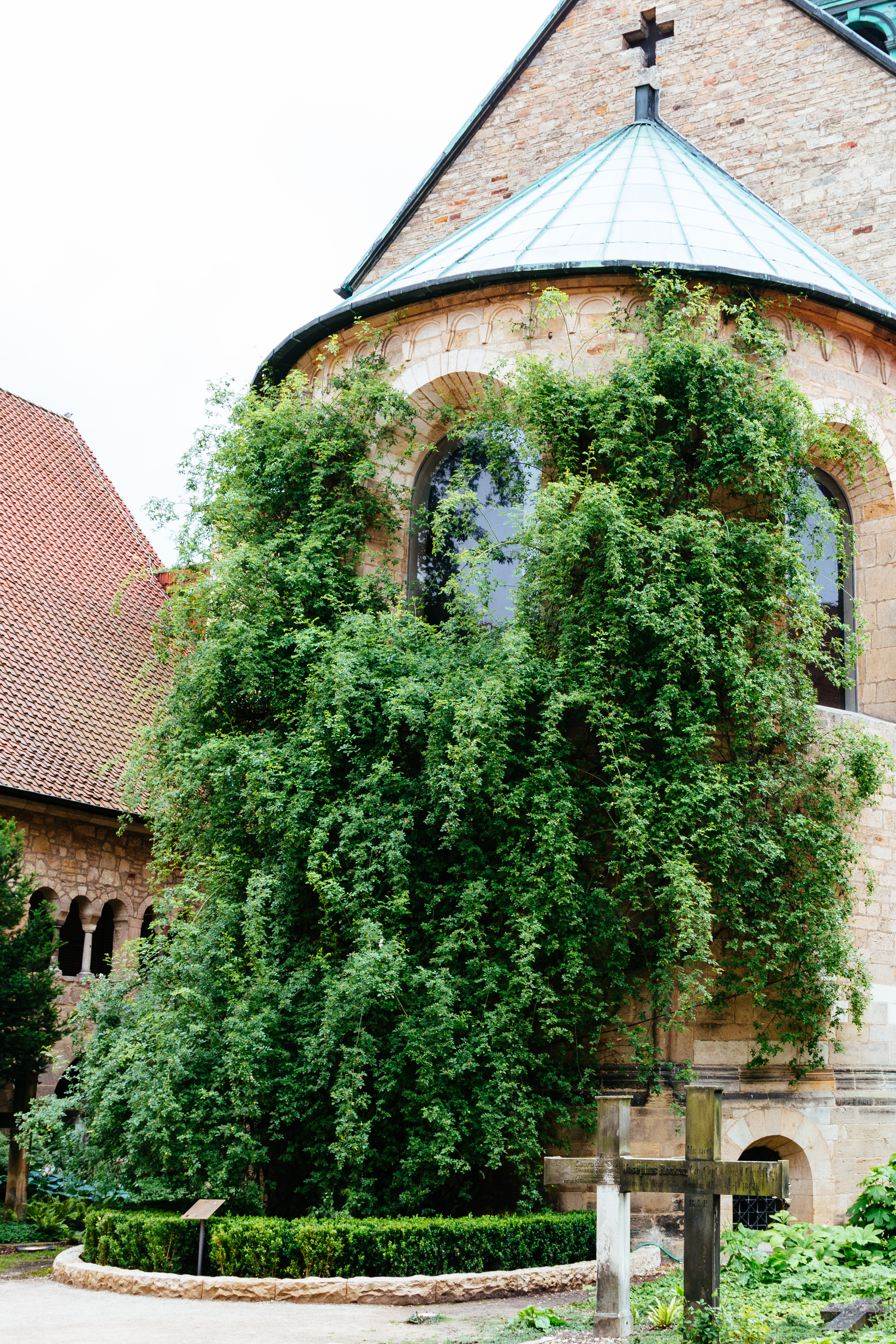
The rosebush with a legend dating back to 815

The cathedral building is widely known for the "Thousand-year Rose" (Tausendjähriger Rosenstock) which grows outside the building on the outer wall of the apse in the courtyard of the cloisters. The exact age of the rose is no longer precisely known, but the legend of the rose bush claims that it dates to 815. It is an important symbol of Hildesheim – according to folklore, as long as the bush flourishes, Hildesheim will prosper.

According to the story, Emperor Louis the Pious had to hold a Mass while out hunting in the middle of the forest. For this purpose, a reliquary of St. Mary which he had with him was hung from the branch of a wild rose. After the mass, the reliquary could not be removed from the branch. The Emperor considered this a sign that the new bishopric should be established here (not in Elze as he had planned) and he should dedicate it to St. Mary, whose symbol is the rose.

The existence of the rose bush has been attested for at least four hundred years. The aerial bombardment of 22 March 1945 which damaged the cathedral and the apse also killed the main growth of the rose bush above the ground; under the rubble, only the charred stump of the rose remained. It was thought that the end of the famous rose had come, but the roots were largely intact, and in the spring of 1945 it put out 25 new shoots. The first sparse flowers bloomed in 1947, and by 1948 there were 122 flowers. Since then, the new branches of the "Thousand-year Rose" (as it was already known before the bombing) have been marked with little metal signs with the year in which they first appeared. It is believed to be the oldest living rose in the world.

== Archaeological finds ==
In excavations during the 2010–2014 renovations of the cathedral, ninth-century foundations of the St. Mary's chapel were found. The first cathedral building was a small church measuring 6 × 6 m with an apse to the east. The remains of the first altar were found in the apse. The foundations of this first cathedral building consist of sandstone and are extraordinarily thick.

An even older cemetery was found to the west and south. Twenty graves were uncovered, including, in August 2012, the skeleton of a young woman who died around 800, with glass beads (the remnants of a necklace) and a little knife as grave goods. This is the oldest complete burial ever found in Hildesheim cathedral.

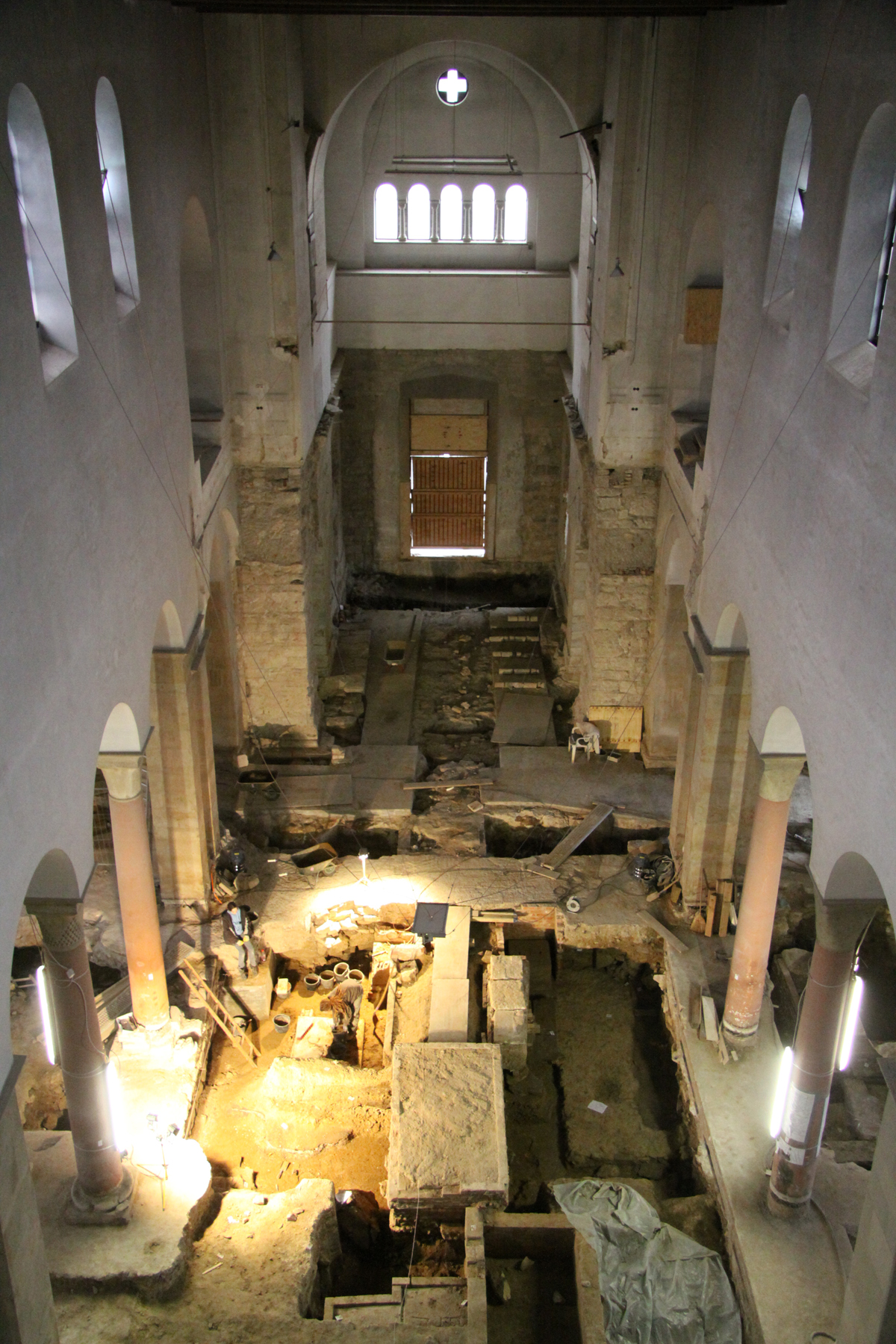
Excavations in the westwork

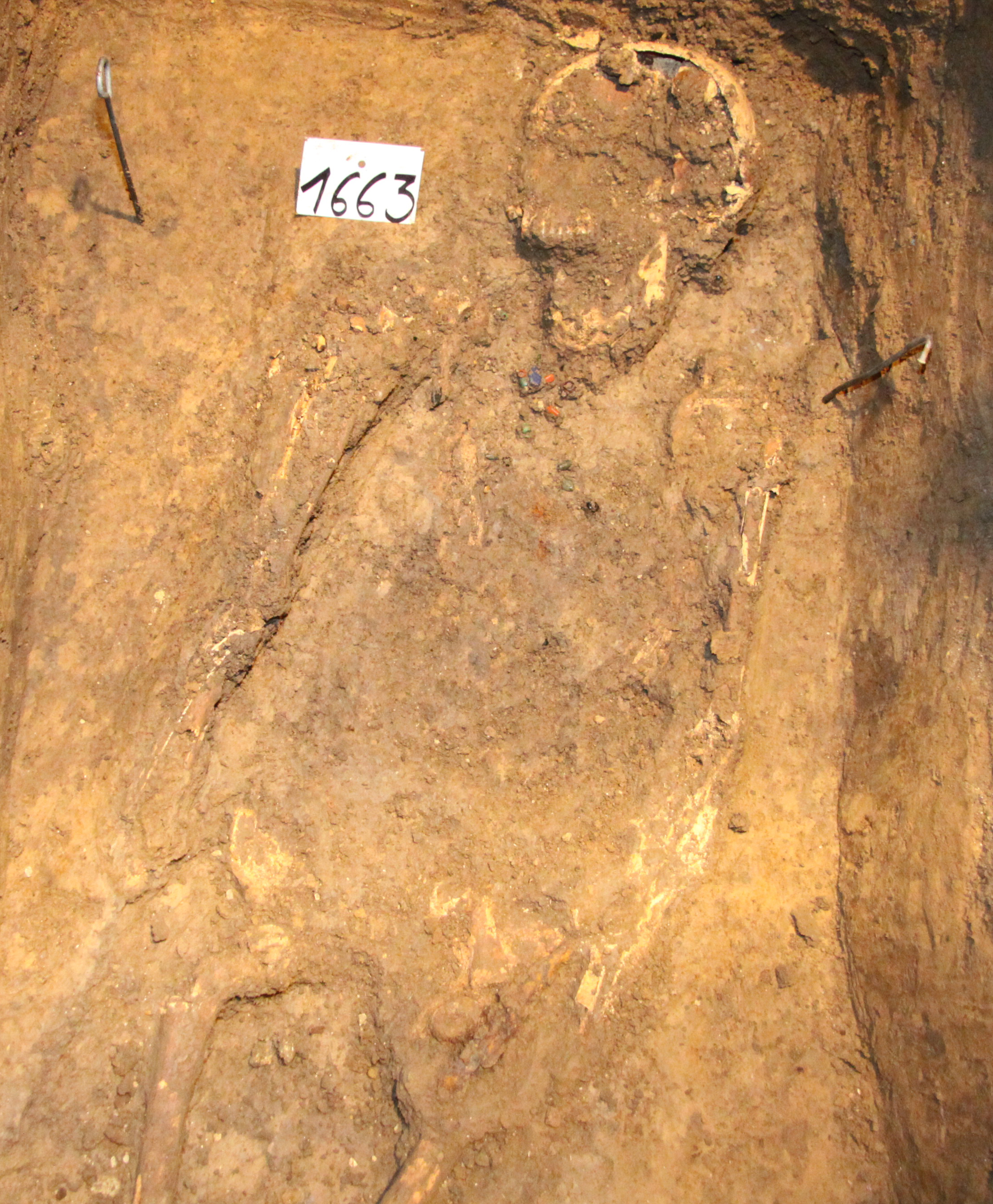
Grave from around 800

== Interior decoration, art, and treasures ==
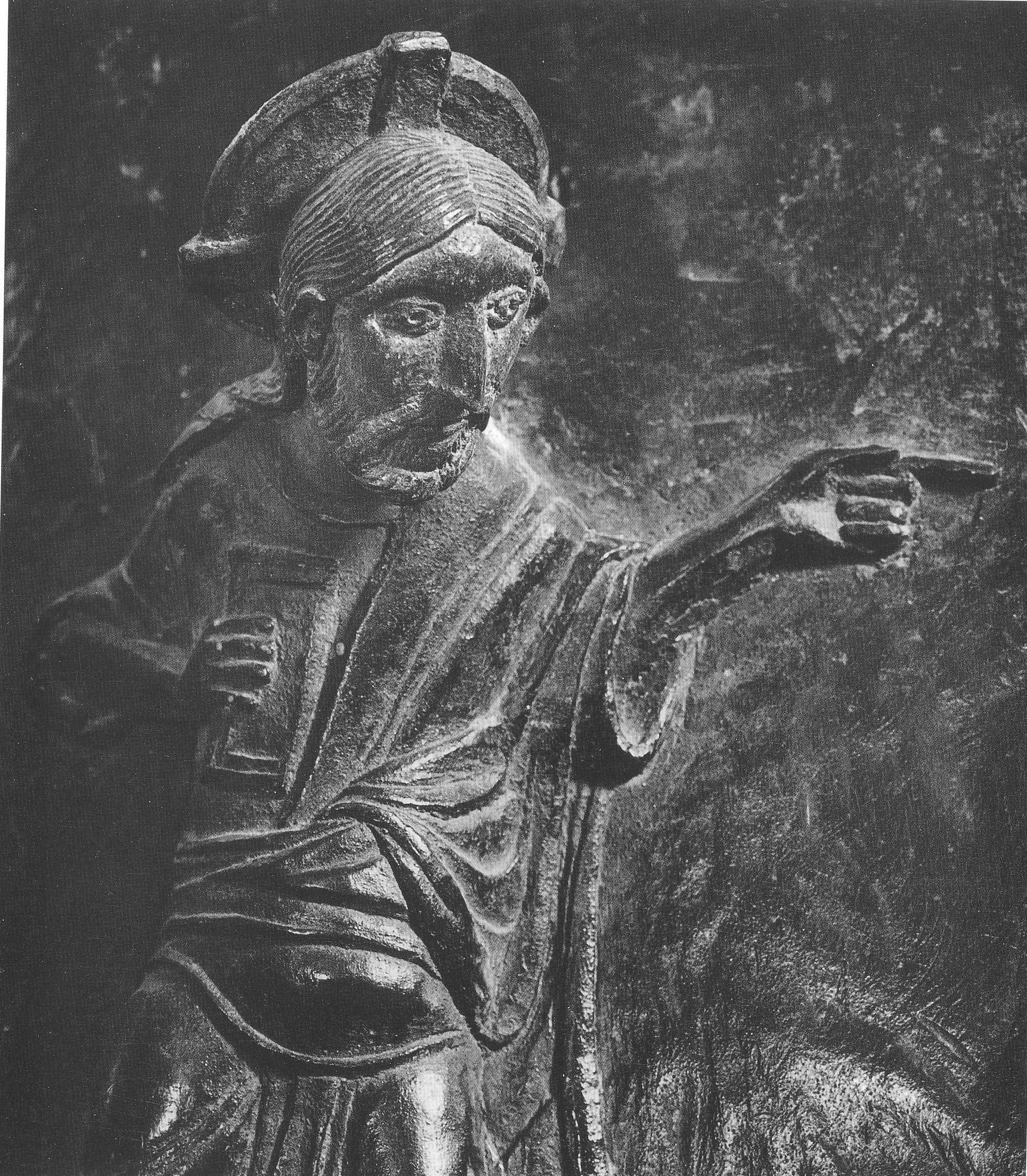
Detail of Bernward Doors

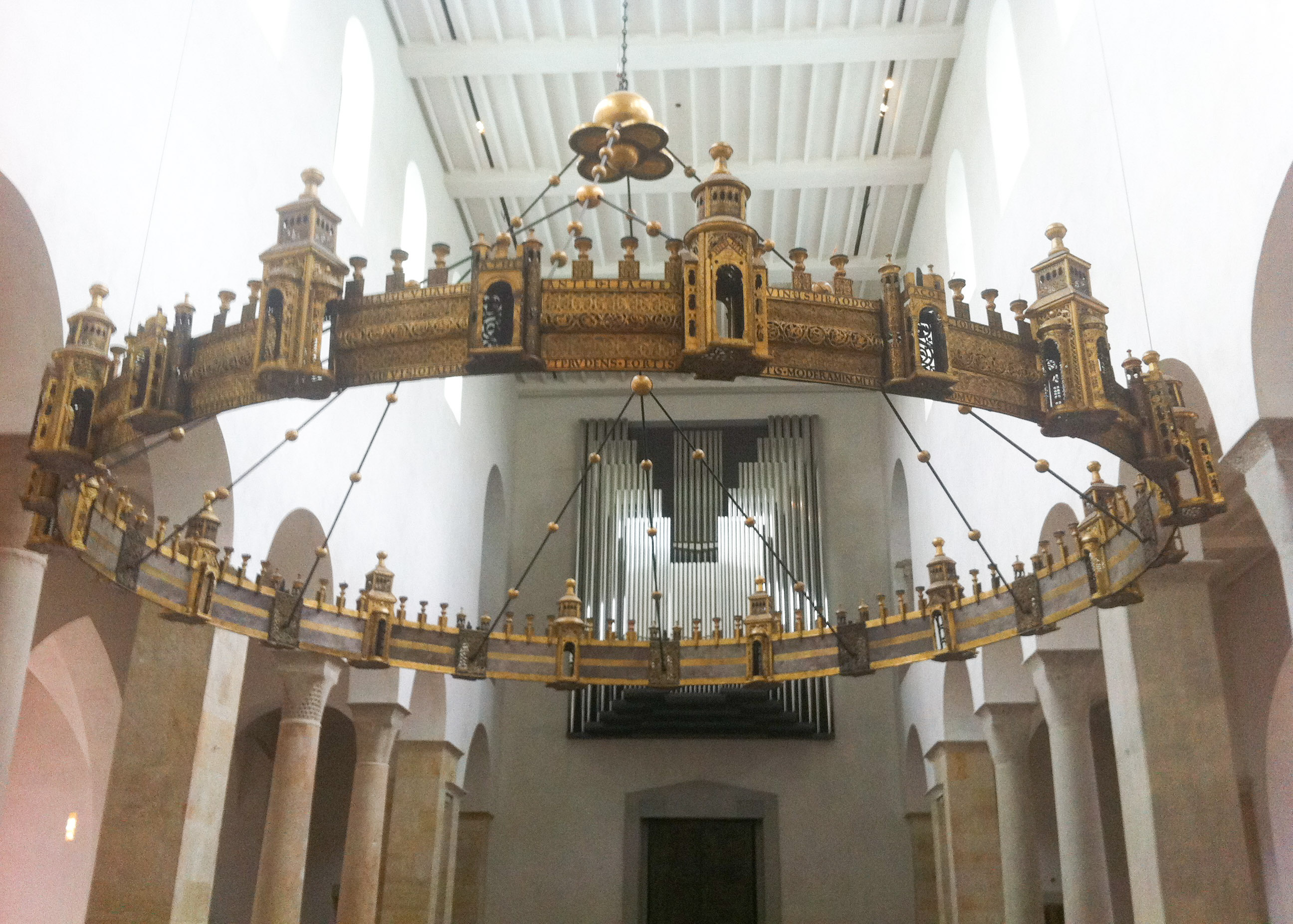
Romanesque Hezilo chandelier

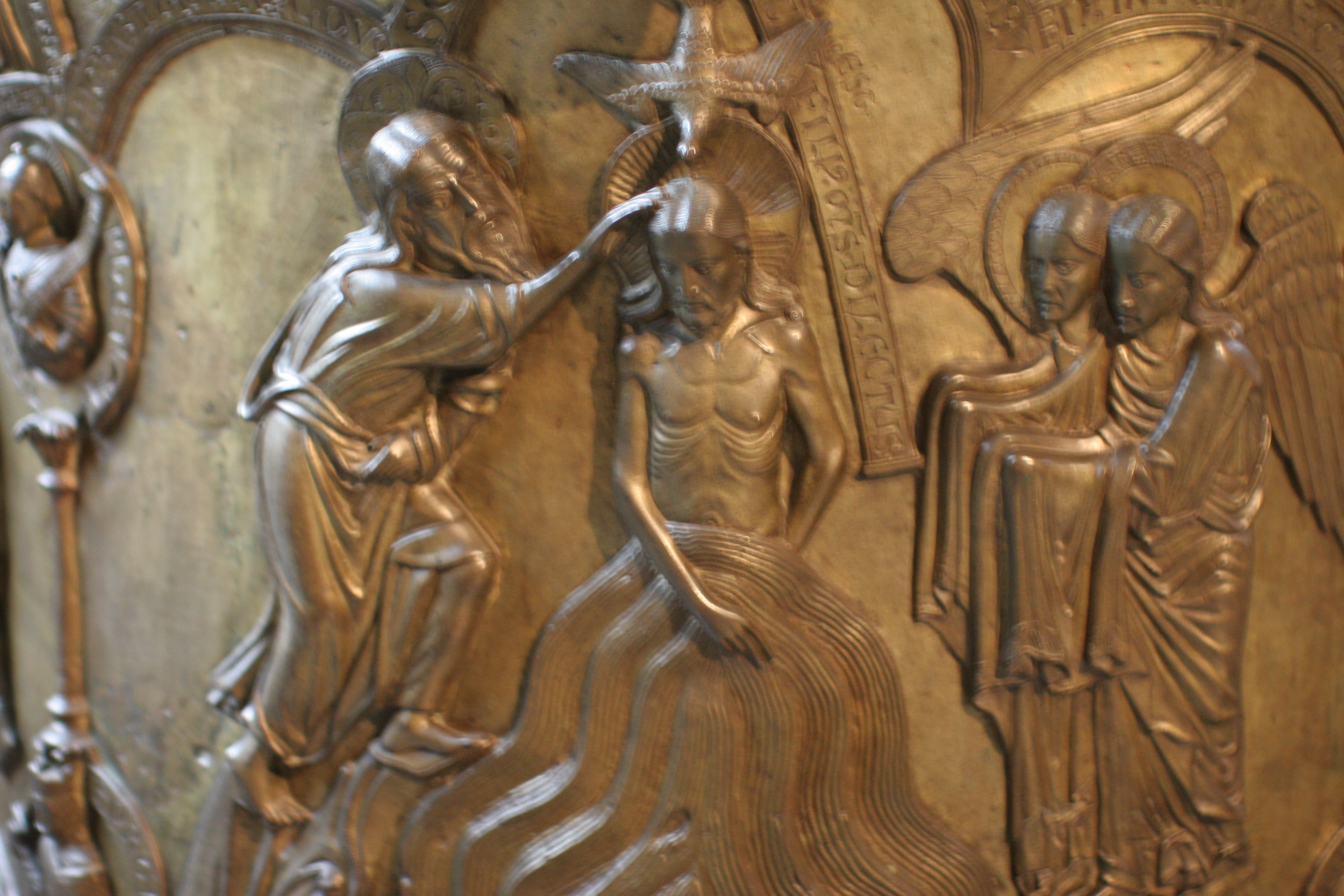
Detail of the baptismal font: Baptism of Christ in the Jordan

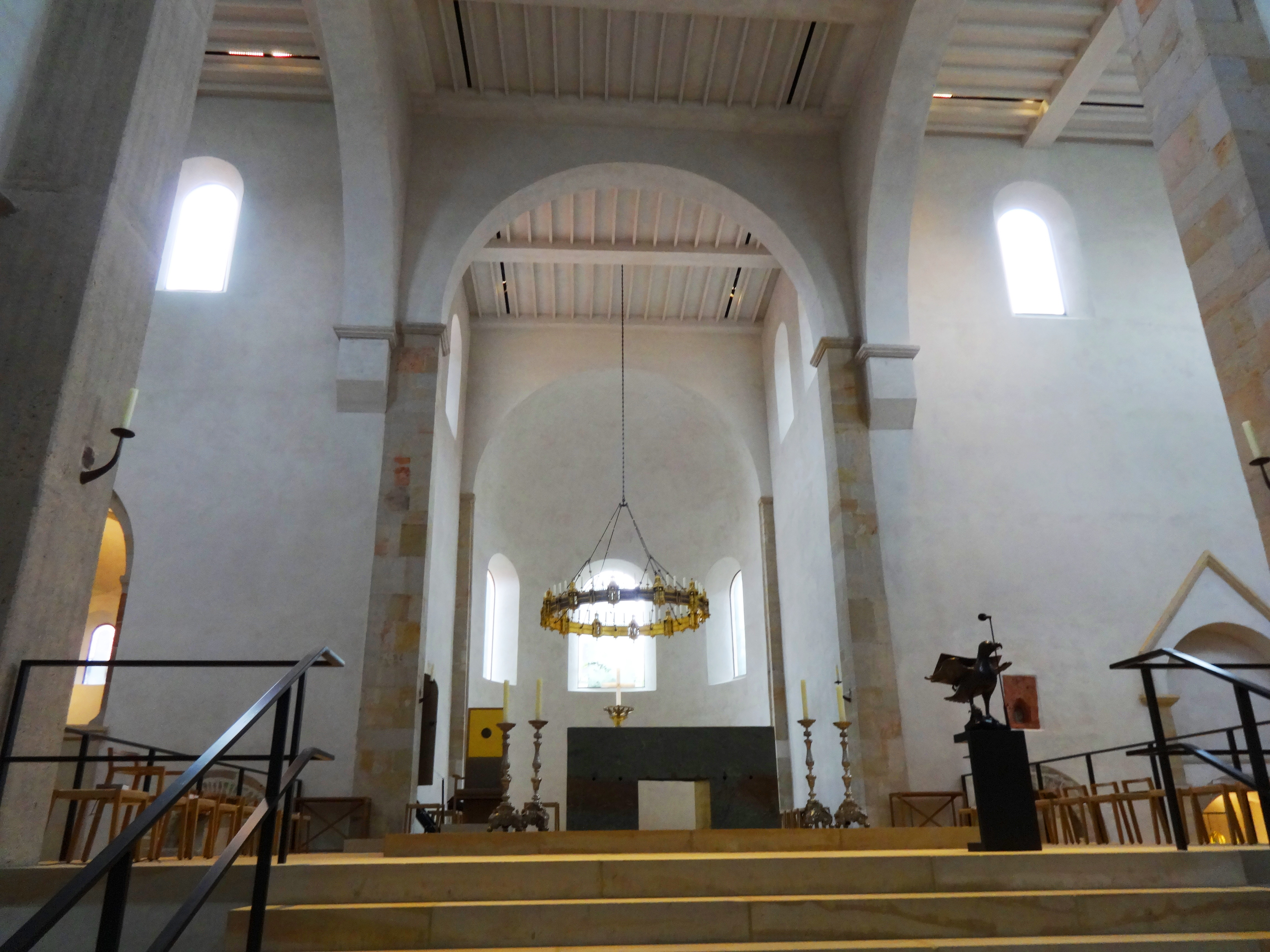
The sanctuary with the Azelin chandelier and the irminsul as apse cross

The cathedral houses numerous works of art. These include the world-famous cast-bronze doors, depicting scenes from the Gospels and the Book of Genesis; and a cast-bronze column depicting scenes from the life of Christ. These bronzeworks date from the early 11th century and were commissioned by Bishop Bernward of Hildesheim. (The column was originally in St Michael's, where Bernward was buried, and was moved there again during the restoration of the cathedral, returning in August 2014.)

There are also four notable Romanesque wheel chandeliers, also called corona or circular chandeliers, the larger Hezilo chandelier (Heziloleuchter), and the older Azelin chandelier (Azelinleuchter). The Ringelheim Crucifix was made c. 1000 from linden wood for the body and oak for the arms.

Other treasures include:

- The shrine of St. Epiphanius of Pavia and Cathedral patrons over a chapel in the northeast, first half of the twelfth century
- The shrine of St. Godehard in the crypt, around 1140
- The Reliquary of Mary, the Crosses of Bernward and further magnificent reliquaries and liturgical implements displayed in Hildesheim Cathedral Museum (Dommuseum Hildesheim) in the south transept
- The eagle lectern, c. 1220, in liturgical use up until the recent renovations
- The late Romanesque bronze baptismal font (Bronzetaufe), 1225
- The gothic Inkpot Madonna (Tintenfassmadonna)
- The central table of the Wrisberg epitaph (in the south transept until the recent renovations))
- An apse cross standing in the apse, the pedestal of which, legend has it, was made from the core of the Irminsul.
- the Tomb of Priest Bruno (de) on the southern exterior wall of the choir
- The Bernward Monument (de) of Carl Ferdinand Hartzer from 1893 stands in front of the north paradise entrance
- Hildesheim rood screen (Hildesheimer Domlettner, de) in the Cathedral Museum

During the 2010–2014 renovations, many religious items from the cathedral were displayed at the Metropolitan Museum of Art in New York City, until 5 January 2014.

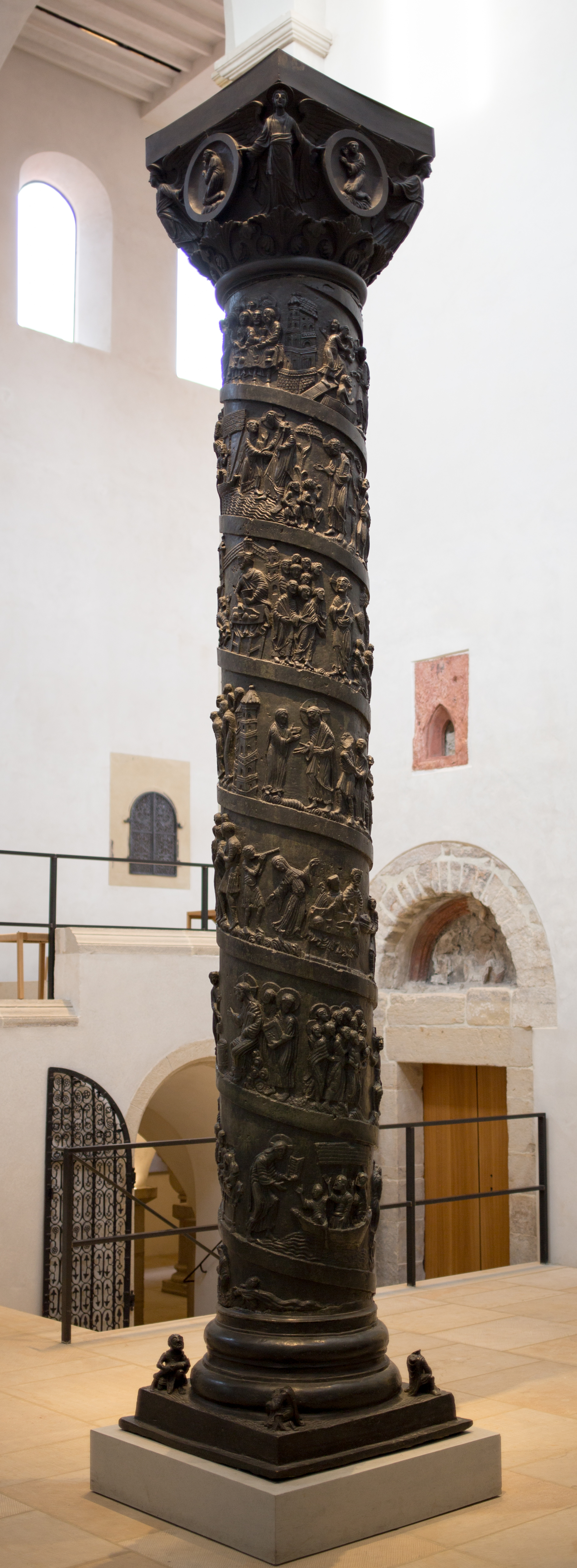
Bernward Column

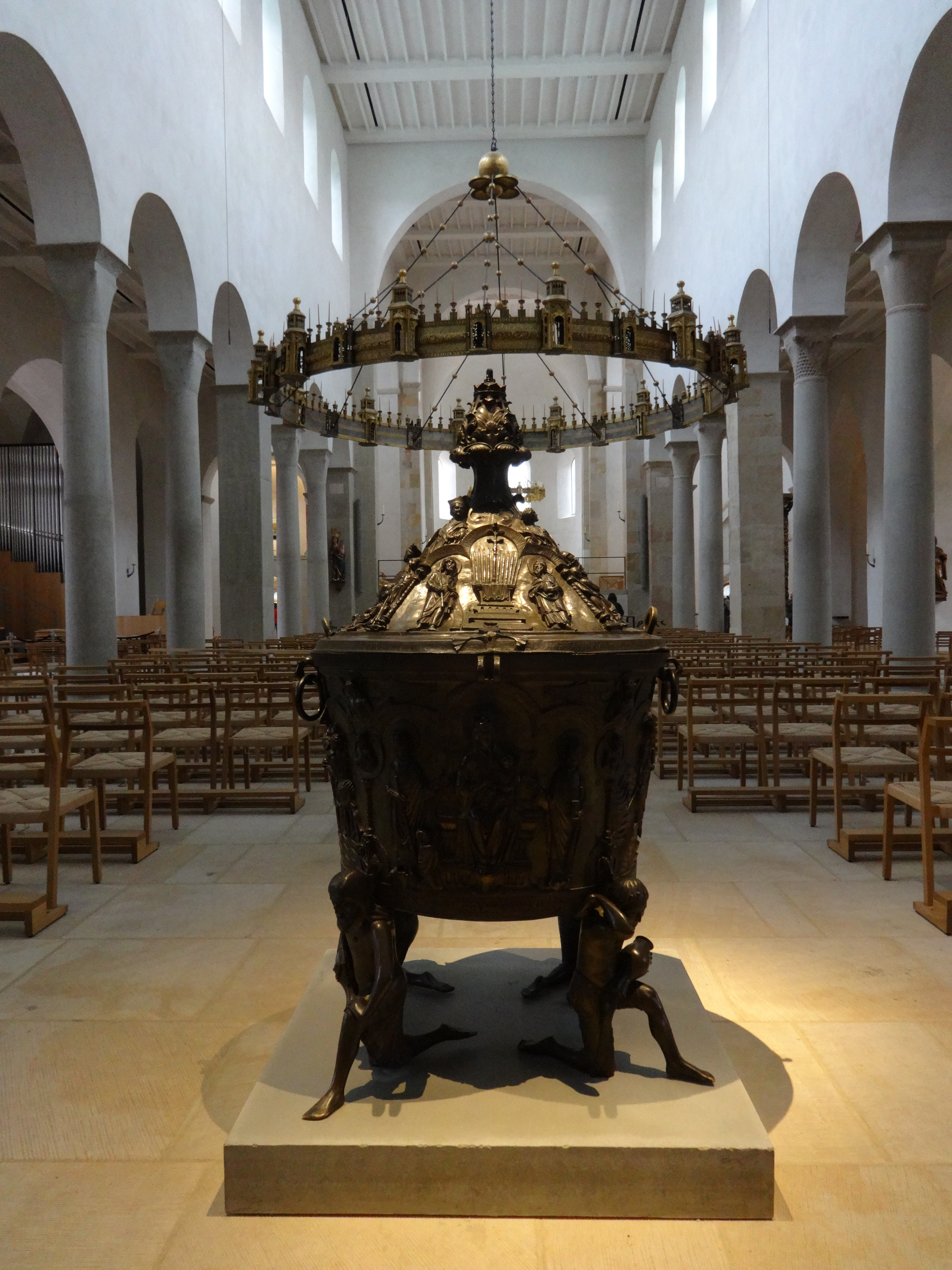
Bronze baptismal font

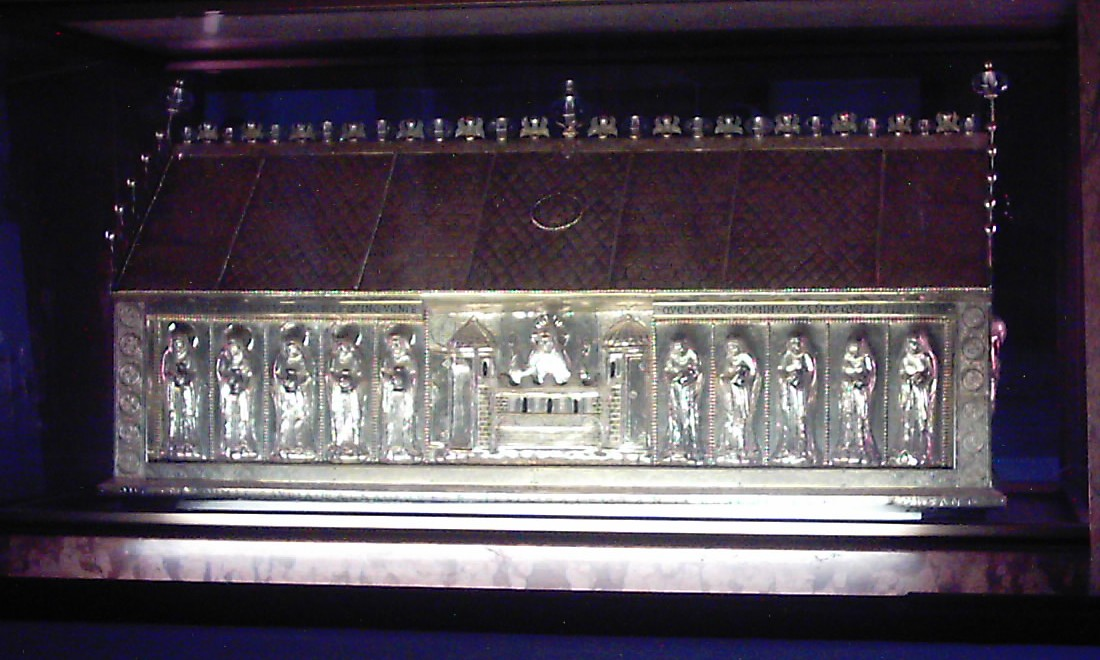
Shrine of St. Epiphanius

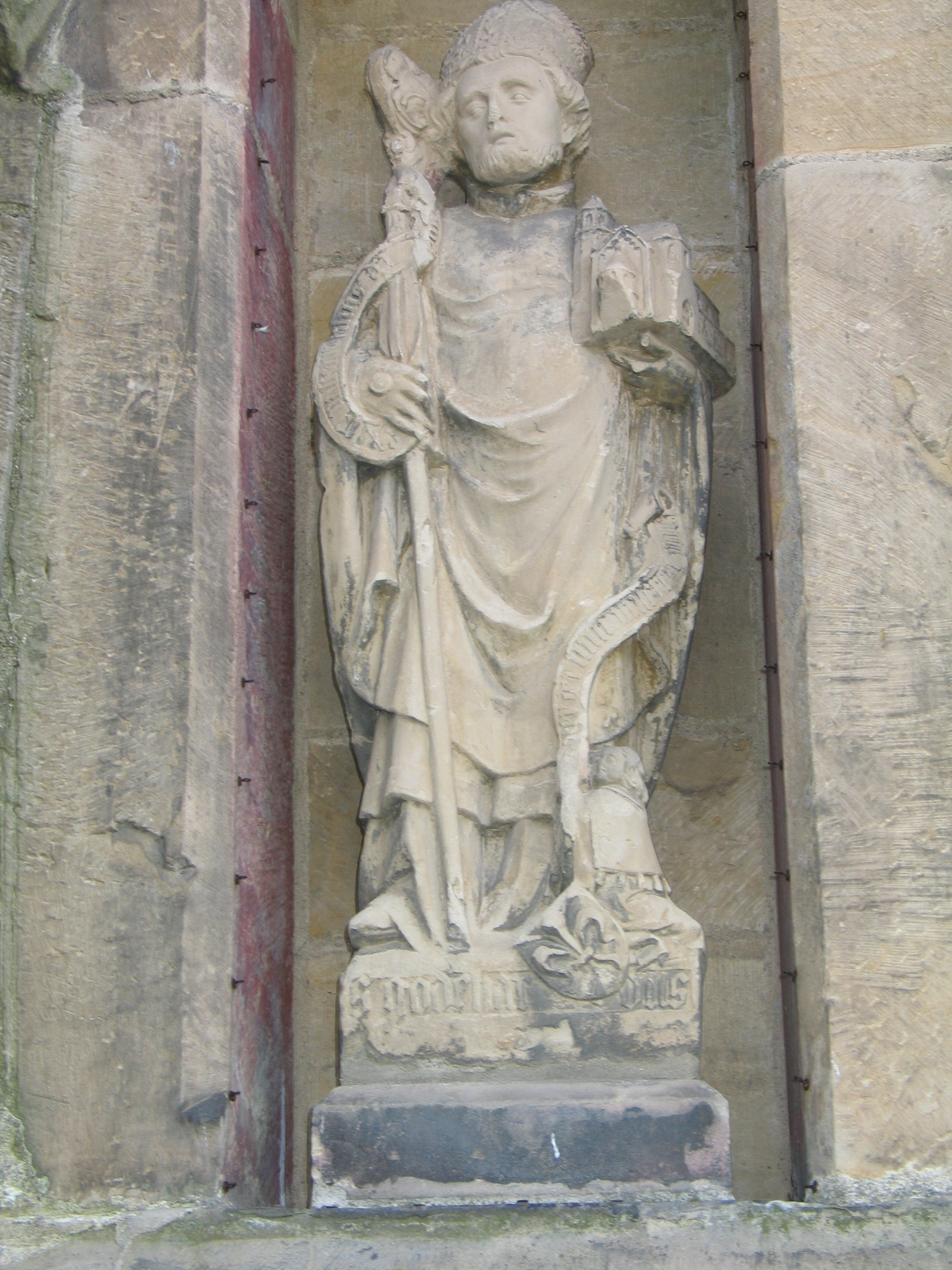
Statue of Bishop Godehard

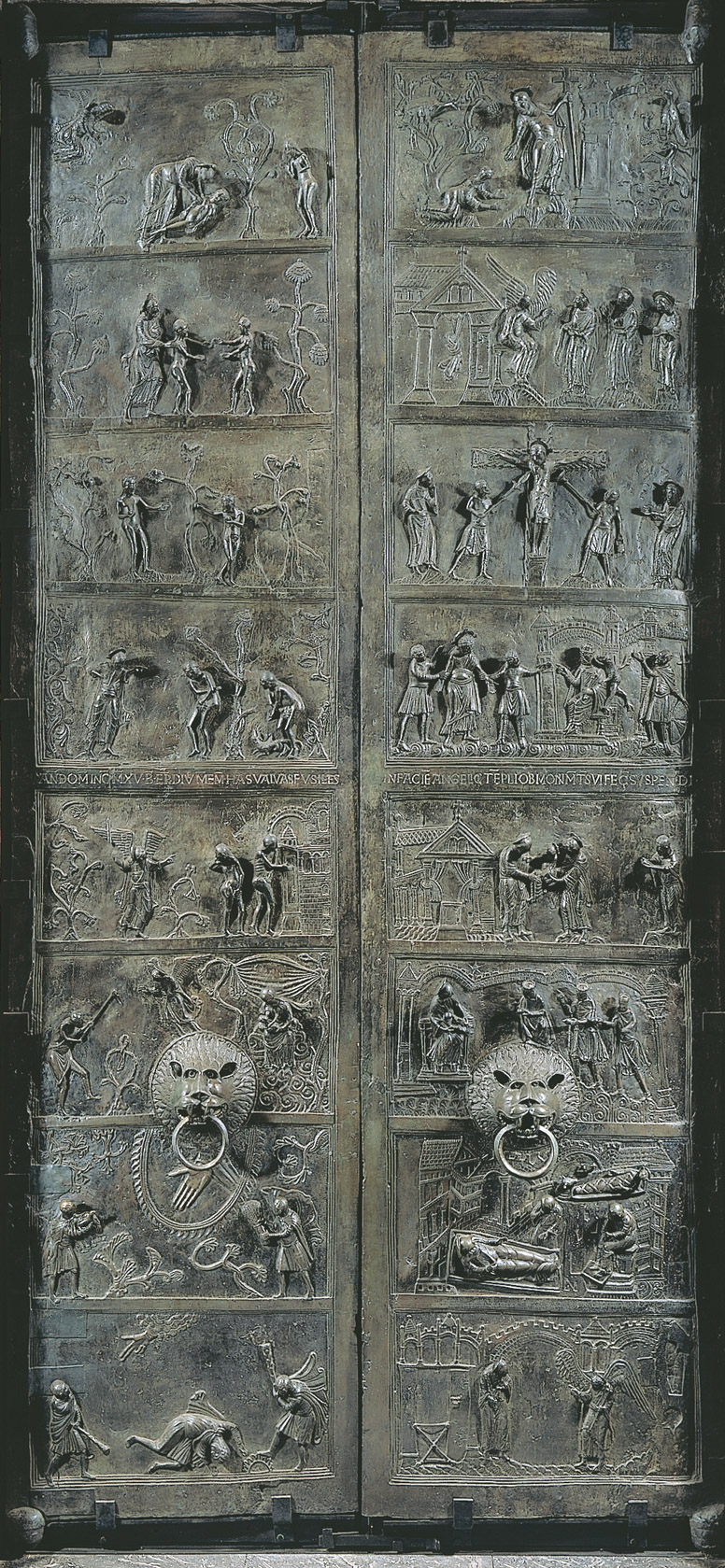
Bernward Doors

== Organs ==
The history of the organ at Hildesheim Cathedral dates back to the fourteenth century. In 1378, there was an organ in the north aisle, above the chapel of the Three Kings. This instrument was relocated to the Godehard choir during the fifteenth century and eventually sold in 1713.

The first large organ was built by Conrad Abtt (Minden) c. 1616/17. The instrument had 31 stops on two manuals and pedal. During the 17th and 18th century, the instrument was rebuilt and expanded. In 1909, Furtwängler & Hammer (Hannover) built a new organ with 54 stops (three manuals and pedal), re-using the organ case from 1617. On March 22, 1945, the organ was destroyed during an air raid.

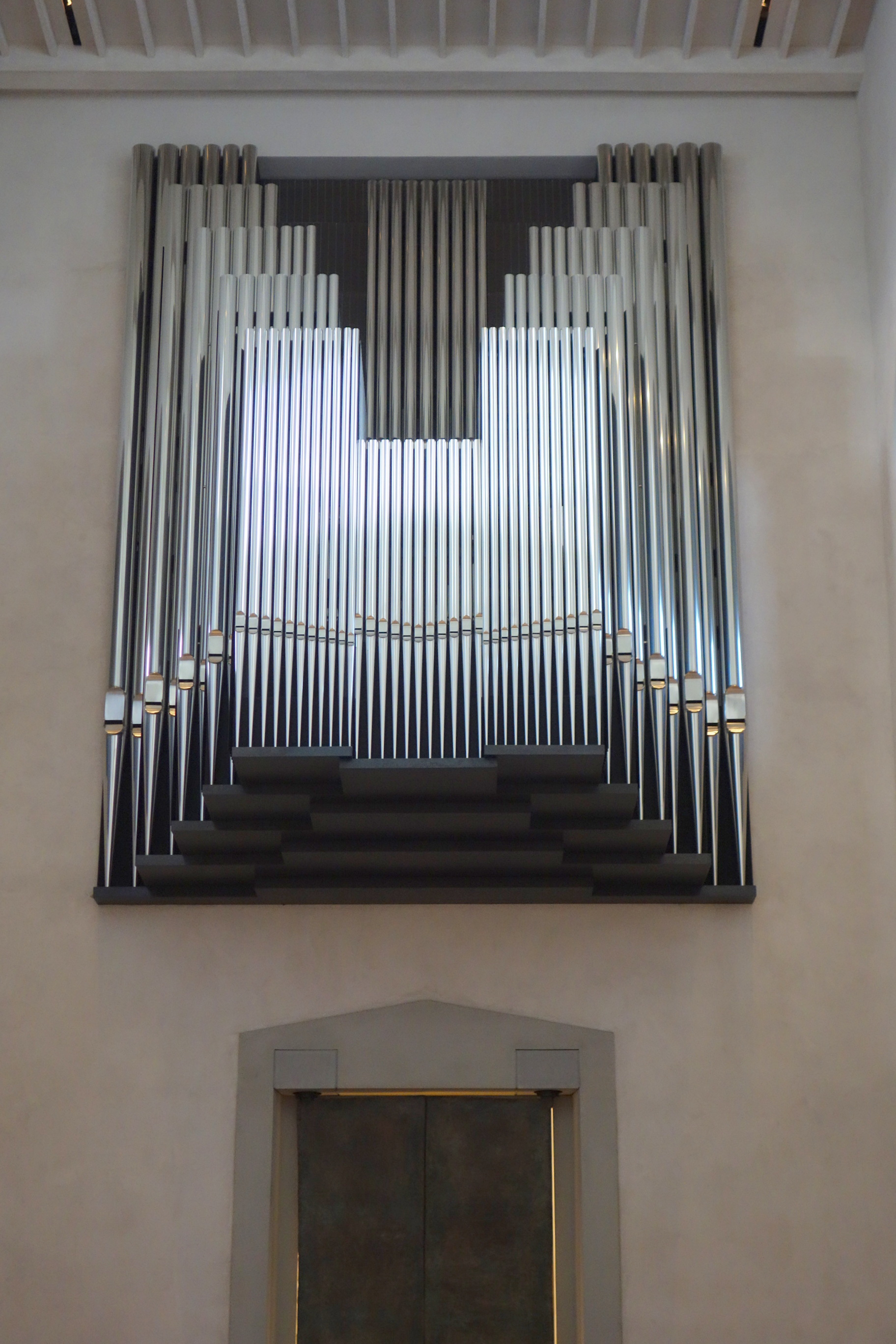
Main Organ by Seifert (2014)

=== Organ 1960–2010 ===
In 1960, Franz Breil (Dorsten) built a new organ with 52 stops on four manuals and pedal. In 1989, it was partially rebuilt and expanded to 66 stops by Klais (Bonn).

=== Seifert Organs (2014) ===
In 2014, Orgelbau Romanus Seifert & Sohn (Kevelaer) built a new organ with 77 stops on four manuals and pedal, re-using windchests and 56 stops from the previous instrument.

In addition, a new antiphonal organ (Chororgel) with 16 stops was built. It is located in the left isle of the cathedral. Both organs can be played from two identical four-manual consoles: the console of the great organ, and a movable console in the nave.

== Bells ==
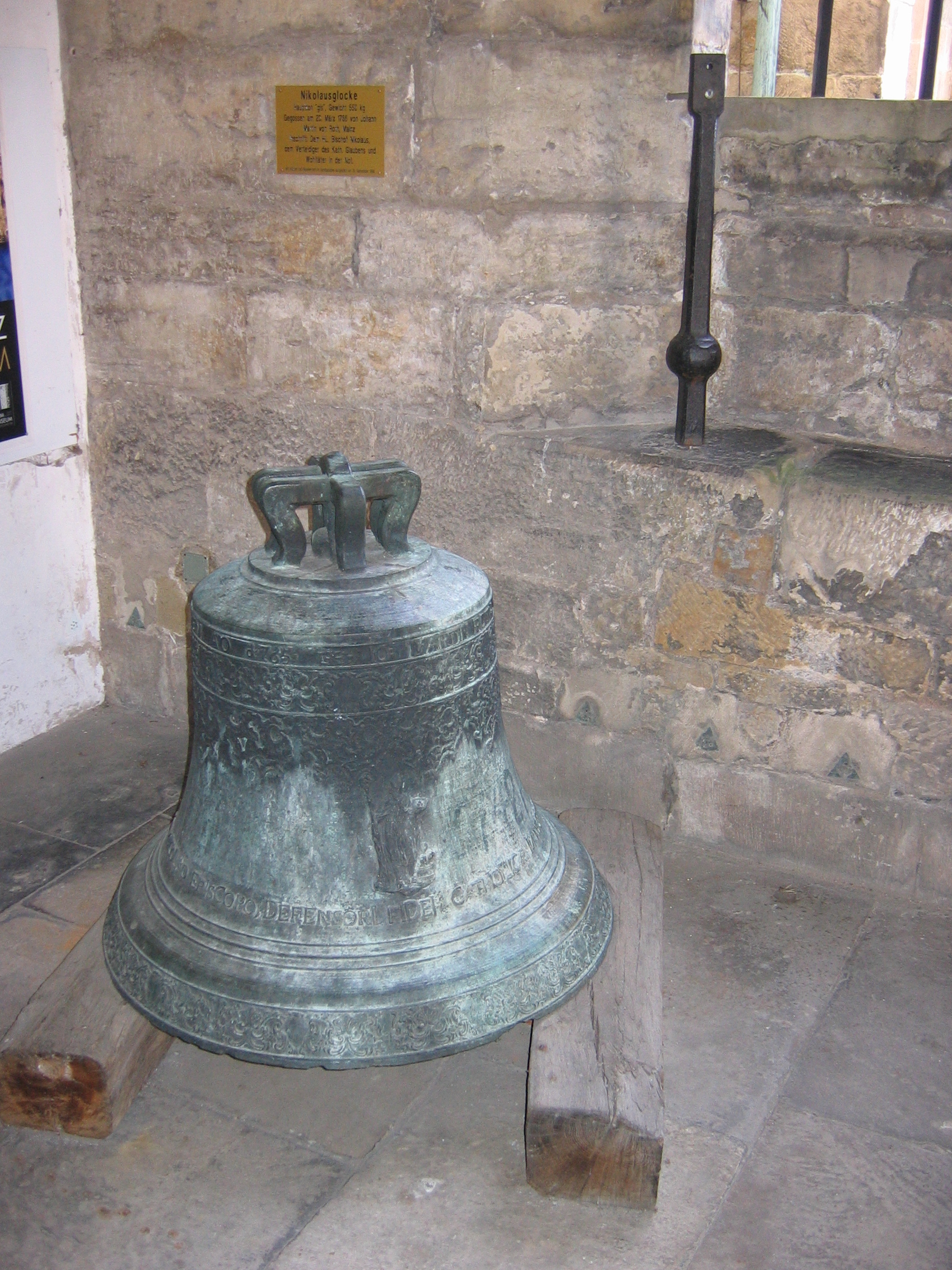
The Nikolaus bell, 1766

Until the Second World War, the cathedral contained over sixteen ringing and quarter bells. The basis of the pre-war peal was five great bells with the tones F-sharp^{0}, A^{0}, C-sharp^{1}, F-sharp^{1}, G-sharp^{1}. Nine bells of the pre-war peal survived the war; the great Godehard bell in the west tower was so severely damaged in an air raid that it could no longer be rung. The Bernard bell is in the Bell cemetery in Hamburg and was irreparably damaged during transport there. Two bells were capable of being reused: the historical Apostolica bell of bellfounder Johann Martin Roth of Mainz (1765), which could be integrated into the new peal, and another historic bell of Johann Martin Roth, the Nikolaus bell, which was originally hung in the crossing tower and was moved to the Nordparadies in 2010.

=== Refounding of 1960 ===
After the Second World War it was planned to create a 12-toned peal, with six great bells in the west tower and six smaller bells in the crossing tower (the planned tones: G^{1}, B♭^{1}, C^{2}, E♭^{2}, F^{2} and G^{2}). At first only a six tone peal was produced. In 1960 the bellfounder Friedrich Wilhelm Schilling (Heidelberg) cast five new bells, which were installed in the west tower together with the Apostolica bell. In the lower belfry of the tower hung the three deepest bells (1–3), while the three smaller bells (4–6) were in the upper belfry. The new peal (co-ordinated with the bells of the surrounding churches) was a semitone deeper than the original, so the Apostolica bell had to be tuned a semitone lower to fit with the new bells.

Since the quarter bells had also been destroyed in the Second World War, the quarter-hour chimes were now struck by bell No. 5, the chime on the hour by bell No.4 and the chime at noon by bell No. 1. Bell No. 6 was used for the call to worship (the Angelusglocke).

=== Renovation 2013/2014 ===
In the course of the 2010–14 renovation, the peal is being expanded by six bells to the 12-tone peal which had originally been planned in the 1960s, though, the tone sequence will be slightly different. The new cathedral bells will be named after witnesses of the faith, who enjoy particular veneration in the Diocese of Hildesheim. Thus bell No. 8 will be named for Bishop Altfrid, one of the most important bishops of Hildesheim, who secured large contributions for the construction of the cathedral. Bell No. 9 will be named after Hedwig of Schlesien (or of Andechs), patron of refugees – since many refugees came to Hildesheim after the Second World War and were crucial in shaping it.

In 2013 the old yoke in the upper belfry was taken apart and replaced by a new yoke of oak. It will hold the six new bells and some of the old ones. In the lower belfry the deepest bells will remain in place.

On 16 November 2013 the new bells were cast by Glockengießerei Bachert (Karlsruhe).

The Cantabona bell is the second biggest of Lower-Saxony after the Christus- und Friedensglocke (Bell of Christ and Peace) in the Marktkirche, Hanover.

Technical information and inscriptions of the bells
No.	Name	Year of casting	Caster, casting location	Ø (mm)	Weight (kg)	Strike tone (ST-^{1}/_{16})	Inscription	Belfry
1	Cantabona (Mary)	1960	Friedrich Wilhelm Schilling, Heidelberg	2315	8686	F^{0} +5	CANTATE DOMINO CANTICUM NOVUM QUIA MIRABILIA FECIT SANCTA MARIA CANTA BONA NOBIS! – Auxilio Matris D.N.J.Ch. confidens me fudit F.W. Schilling Heidelbergensis Anno Domini MCMLIX ("Sing for the Lord a new song since he has made miracles. Holy Mary sing good things for us! – trusting in the aid of the mother of our Lord Jesus Christ, F.W. Schillung of Heidelberg cast me in the year of our Lord 1959.")	Lower westwork
2	Apostolica	1765	Johann Martin Roth, Mainz	1946	4895	A♭^{0} +5	Johann Martin Koch von Maintz hat mich gegossen in Hildesheim Anno 1765, APOSTOLIS PETRO ET PAULO COMPATRONIS HILDESIENSIBUS ("Johann Martin Koch of Mainz cast me in Hildesheim in the year 1765, for the Apostles Peter and Paul, joint-patrons of Hildesheim.")	Lower westwork
3	Bernward	1960	Friedrich Wilhelm Schilling, Heidelberg	1699	3366	B♭^{0} +4	SIT PIA PAX ET VOS AMEN CANITE SANCTE BERNWARDE ORA PRO NOBIS0 ("May there be holy peace. Sing "Amen"! Saint Bernward, plead for us")	Lower westwork
4	Godehard	1960	Friedrich Wilhelm Schilling, Heidelberg	1502	2278	C^{1} +4	STERNE RESISTENTES/STANTES REGE/TOLLE JACENTES. SANCTE GODEHARDE ORA PRO NOBIS ("Otherthrow the resisters/ rule the upstanding/ lift up the downcast. Saint Godehard plead for us")	Upper westwork
5	Epiphanius	1960	Friedrich Wilhelm Schilling, Heidelberg	1258	1343	E♭^{1} +6	EPIPHANIUS PACIFICATOR PATRONUS EPIPHANIAM DOMINI NUNTIAT. SANCTE EPIPHANI PRECARE PRO NOBIS ("Epiphanius the peacemaker and patron announces the epiphany of the Lord. Saint Epiphanius, pray for us")	Upper westwork
6	Cäcilia	1960	Friedrich Wilhelm Schilling, Heidelberg	1156	1068	F^{1} +4	CANTANTIBUS ORGANIS CAECILIA DOMINO DECANTABAT! SANCTA CAECILIA ADJUVA NOS ("while the organs sing, Caecilia sings to the Lord! Holy Caecilia, aid us")	Upper westwork
7	Martin of Tours	2013	Bachert, Karlsruhe	1076	917	G^{1} +3	HIC EST FRATRUM AMATOR + QUI MULTUM ORAT PRO POPULO; SANCTE MARTINE + ORA PRO NOBIS ("He who pleads a lot for the people, loves his brothers Holy Martin, plead for us!")	Upper westwork
8	Altfrid	2013	Bachert, Karlsruhe	1009	767	A♭^{1} +6	INTERCESSIONE SANCTI EPISCOPI ALTFRIDI SUFFULTA + DIOECESIS NOSTRA FIRMA IN FIDE MANEAT ("Supported by the intercession of Holy Bishop Altfrid, may our diocese remain firm in its faith")	Upper westwork
9	Hedwig	2013	Bachert, Karlsruhe	896	521	B♭^{1} +6	BEATAE HEDVIGIS INTERCESSIO TRIBUAT POPULIS POLONIAE ET GERMANIAE CAELESTE SUBSIDIUM ("The intercession of blessed Hedwig grants the support of Heaven to the people of Poland and Germany")	Upper westwork
10	Oliver Plunkett	2013	Bachert, Karlsruhe	792	357	C^{2} +5	PROBASTI NOS + DEUS + ET EDUXISTI NOS IN REFRIGERIUM; SANCTUS OLIVERUS PLUNKETT + RECONCILIATIONIS EXEMPLUM + EPISCOPUS ET MARTYR + ADIUVET NOS (You have tested us, God, and you have brought us to consolation. May holy Oliver Plunkett, example of reconciliation, Bishop and martyr, aid us")	Upper westwork
11	Niels Stensen	2013	Bachert, Karlsruhe	733	294	E♭^{2} +7	PULCHRA QUAE VIDENTUR + PULCHRIORA QUAE SCIUNTUR + LONGE PULCHERRIMA QUAE IGNORANTUR; BEATE NICOLAE STENSEN + ORA PRO NOBIS ("What is seen is beautiful, what is known is more beautiful, what is unknown is most beautiful by far. Blessed Nicholas Stensen, plead for us")	Upper westwork
12	Edith Stein	2013	Bachert, Karlsruhe	671	232	F^{2} +6	CRUX EXALTATUR + UT CAELUM OSTENDAT; SANCTA TERESIA BENEDICTA A CRUCE + ORA PRO NOBIS ("The cross is raised up to touch the heavens. Holy Teresa blessed by the cross, plead for us")	Upper westwork
–	Nikolaus	1766	Johann Martin Roth, Mainz	950	550	A♭^{1} +2		–

== World Heritage Site ==
Hildesheim Cathedral was declared a World Heritage Site by UNESCO in 1985, along with St. Michael's Church.

== Reopening ==
On 15 August 2014, the cathedral was reopened after restoration. Bishop Norbert Trelle opened the Bernward doors and entered the cathedral, followed by 30 other bishops and guests including the Protestant bishop Christoph Meyns, Robert Zollitsch, Stephan Weil and Christian Wulff. Trelle said in his sermon: "Die Kirche muss auf die Zukunft hin leben, so wie sie aus der Vergangenheit heraus lebt." (The church has to live towards a future, as it lives from by the past). He added, regarding the situation in Syria: "Während wir hier einen Dom wiedereröffnen, brennen dort die Kirchen." (While we reopen a cathedral here, churches are burnt there). The cathedral was restored to an appearance closer to the original building from the medieval age, for example a ceiling inserted after World War II was removed, and the original floor level restored. A new altar was created by Ulrich Rückriem.

== Location ==
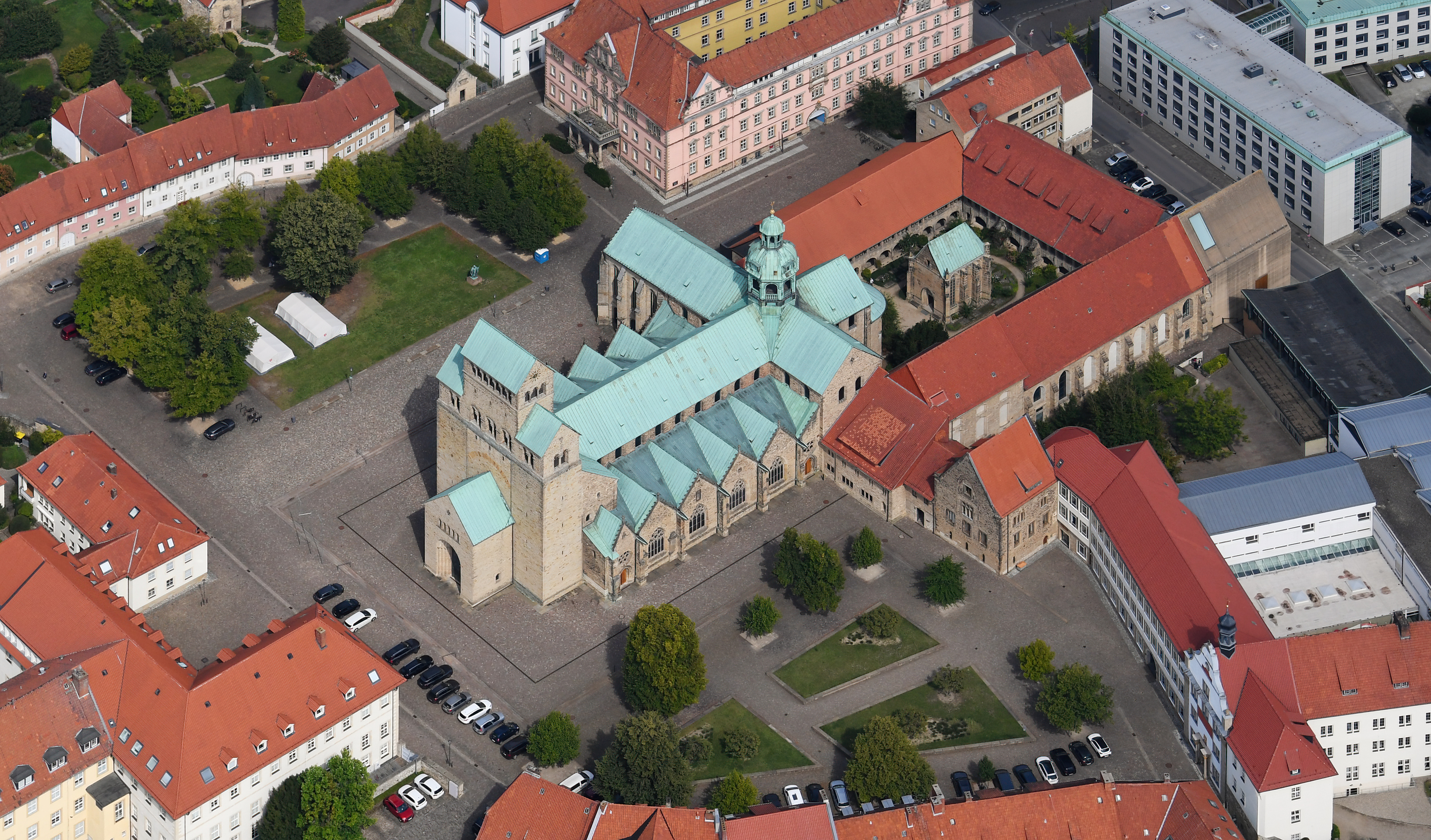
Aerial view of the Hildesheim Cathedral on the Domhügel

Hildesheim Cathedral is situated at the southern middle of the city centre of Hildesheim, on the so-called Domhügel ("Cathedral's Hill"). The main entrances to the cathedral are on the south and north sides. The Roemer- and Pelizaeus-Museum, is very close to the cathedral in the west. Around the hill is the wall of the Domburg. From the north of the Hill is the Michaelishügel ("St. Michael's Hill"), from the northeast is the downtown of Hildesheim and to the west is the River Mühlengraben, a tributary of the Innerste River. On the north of the cathedral is the former government building of the city, on the west the Episcopal Vicariate General of the Diocese, in the south the Gymnasium Josephinum school and on the east the Labour Court of the city.

== Bibliography ==
- Brandt, Michael (2009), Bernwards Säule – Schätze aus dem Dom zu Hildesheim (in German), Regensburg: Schnell & Steiner, ISBN 978-3-7954-2046-8.
- ——— (2010), Bernwards Tür – Schätze aus dem Dom zu Hildesheim (in German), Regensburg: Schnell & Steiner, ISBN 978-3-7954-2045-1.
- Gallistl, Bernhard (2007–2008), "In Faciem Angelici Templi. Kultgeschichtliche Bemerkungen zu Inschrift und ursprünglicher Platzierung der Bernwardstür", Jahrbuch für Geschichte und Kunst im Bistum Hildesheim (in German), 75–76: 59–92, ISSN 0341-9975.
- ——— (2000), Der Dom zu Hildesheim und sein Weltkulturerbe, Bernwardstür und Christussäule (in German), Hildesheim: Bernward Mediengesellschaft, ISBN 3-89366-500-5.
- Heise, Karin (1998), Der Lettner des Hildesheimer Doms – Die Bildhauerkunst der Münsterschen Werkstätten 1535–1560, Der Hildesheimer Dom – Studien und Quellen (in German), vol. 2, 1 + 2, 2, Hildesheim: Georg Olms Verlag, 2 volumes.
- Claudia Höhl. Das Taufbecken des Wilbernus – Schätze aus dem Dom zu Hildesheim, Verlag Schnell & Steiner GmbH, Regensburg 2009, ISBN 978-3-7954-2047-5.
- Ulrich Knapp (ed.), EGO SUM HILDENSEMENSIS – Bischof, Domkapitel und Dom in Hildesheim 815 bis 1810, (Kataloge des Dom-Museums Hildesheim; Bd. 3), Michael Imhof Verlag, Petersberg (2000), ISBN 3-932526-74-0.
- Karl Bernhard Kruse (ed.), Der Hildesheimer Dom – Von der Kaiserkapelle und den Karolingischen Kathedralkirchen bis zur Zerstörung 1945 (Grabungen und Bauuntersuchungen auf dem Domhügel 1988 bis 1999), Verlag Hahnsche Buchhandlung, Hannover (2000), ISBN 3-7752-5644-X.
- Annett Laube-Rosenpflanzer & Lutz Rosenpflanzer. Kirchen, Klöster, Königshöfe : vorromanische Architektur zwischen Weser und Elbe, Halle 2007, ISBN 3-89812-499-1.
