= Hedwig von Beverfoerde =

German political activist (born 1963)

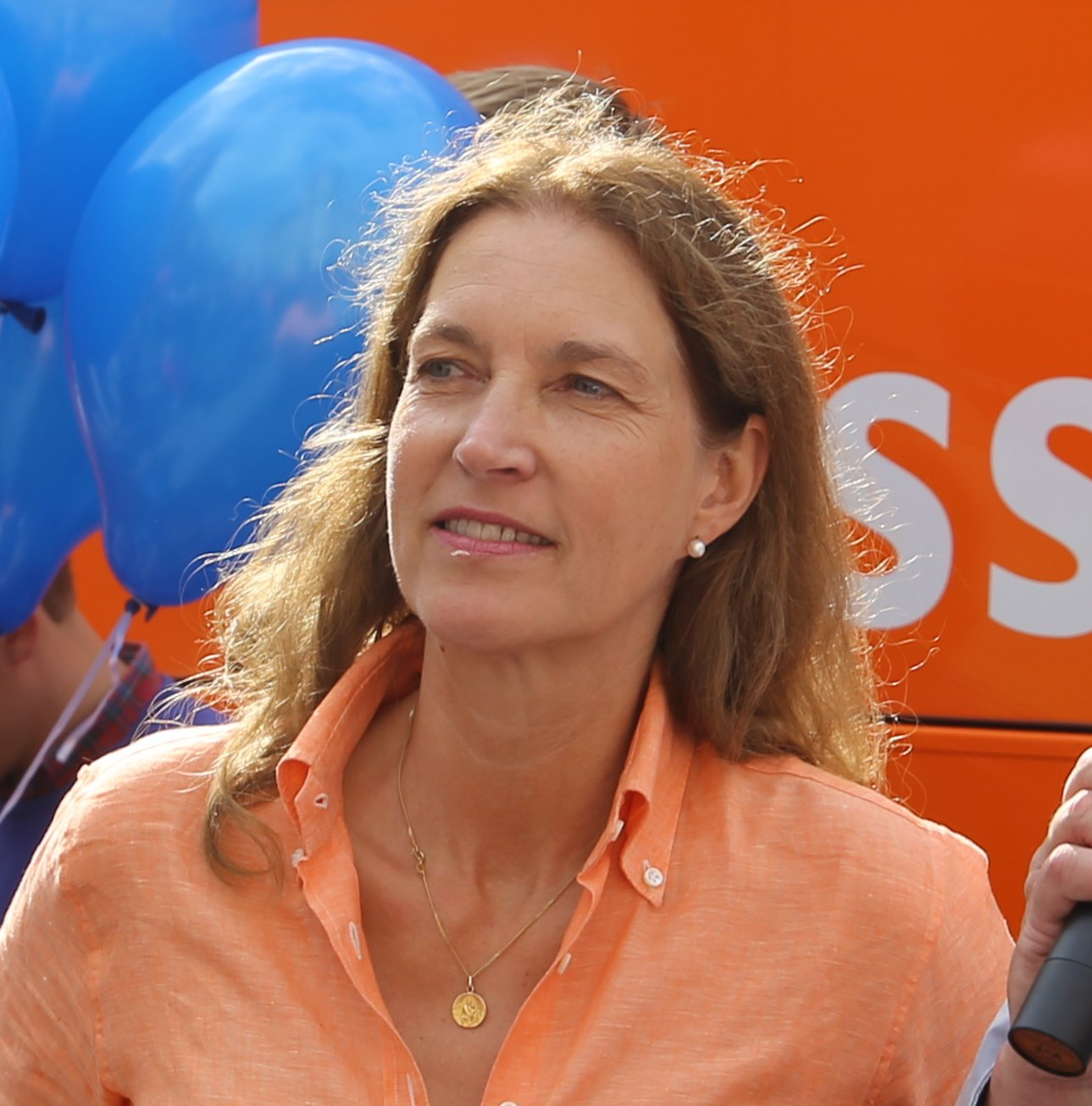
- Baroness von Beverfoerde in 2017
- Full name: Hedwig Freifrau von Elverfeldt genannt Beverförde zu Werries
- Born: Hedwig Freiin von Lüninck; 1963 (age 62–63); Bestwig, Hochsauerlandkreis, North Rhine-Westphalia; West Germany
- Noble family: Lüninck (by birth); Beverfoerde (by marriage)
- Spouse: Baron Josef von Beverfoerde
- Occupation: political activist, Catholic activist

Baroness Hedwig von Elverfeldt genannt Beverfoerde zu Werries (German: Hedwig Freifrau von Elverfeldt genannt Beverförde zu Werries, née von Lüninck; born 1963) is a German conservative politician and Catholic activist. A former member of the Christian Democratic Union of Germany who worked to shorten daycare hours in Saxony-Anhalt and protect parental rights, she is the founder of the Family Protection Initiative and an organizer of the Demo für Alle rallies in Hanover and Stuttgart, campaigning against same-sex marriage and other LGBT rights.

== Early life and education ==
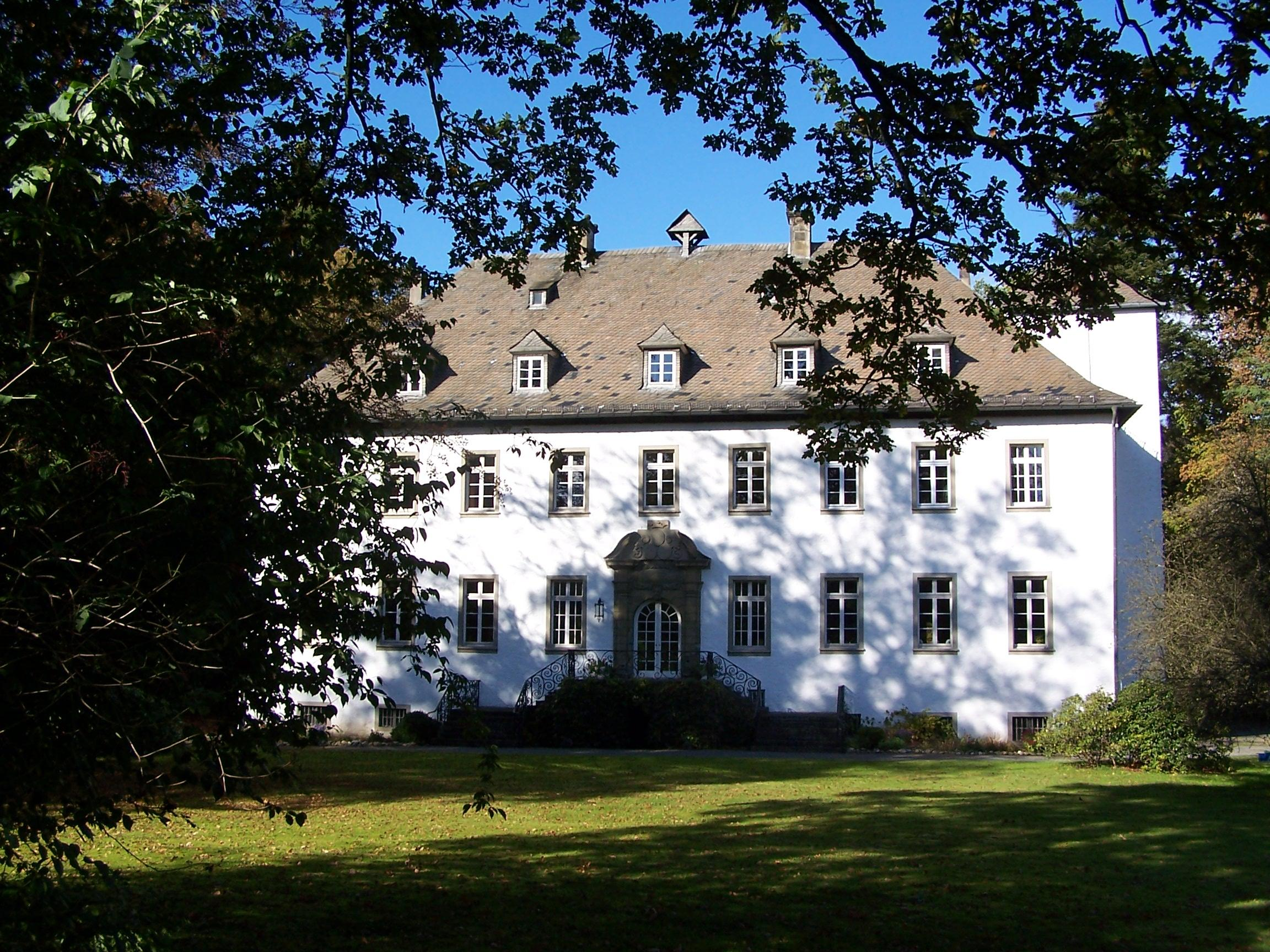
Ostwig House, Von Beverfoerde's birthplace.

Von Beverfoerde was born Baroness Hedwig von Lüninck in 1963 at Ostwig House, a mansion in Bestwig, North Rhine-Westphalia, owned by her family. She is a member of the Von Lüninck family, who are part of the German nobility, and is a relative of the politician Baron Ferdinand von Lüninck. After graduating from Kloster Wald, a Catholic boarding school for girls in Wald, Baden-Württemberg, she trained as a secretary in Brussels before studying business administration at a university in Münster.

== Career ==
After graduating from university, Von Beverfoerde worked as an assistant sales director of a stock corporation in Magdeburg. In 1993 she left business to pursue political activism. She was an active member of the Christian Democratic Union of Germany until December 2016, serving as a district board member of the Jerichower Land. She left the party in 2016, stating that she could not remain in the party as "a faithful Catholic" while under the leadership of Angela Merkel, and due to her disagreement with the party's acceptance of opening German borders to Muslim refugees. Her earlier political career was focused on public education and childcare. From 1999 until 2000 she served as a spokeswoman of the national citizen's movement ABC-Schützen! She worked to protect parental rights and campaigned for shorter daycare hours.

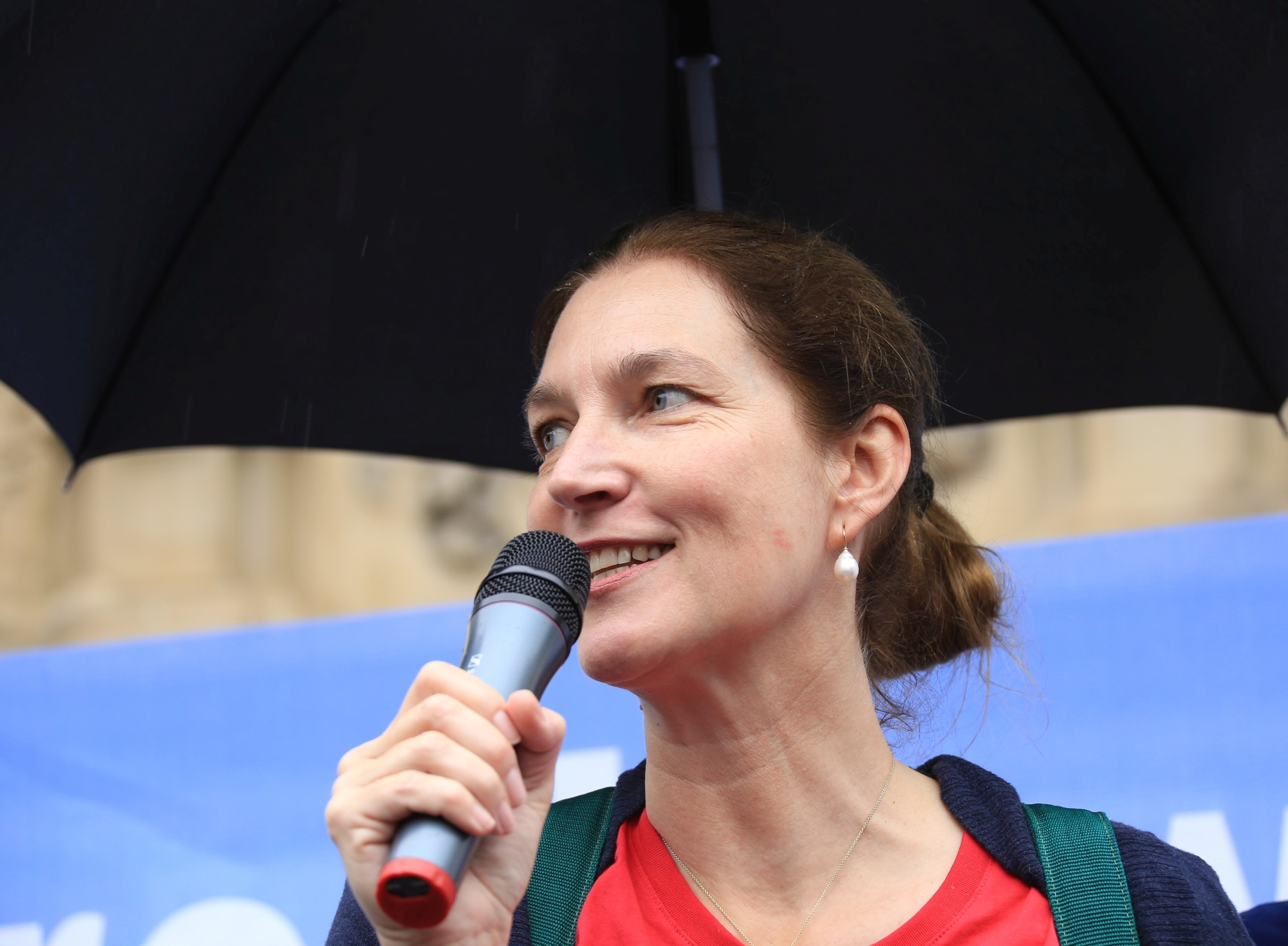
Von Beverfoerde speaking at a ; Demo für Alle rally in Stuttgart in 2014.

Von Beverfoerde is the founder and chairwoman of the Family Protection Initiative, which promotes conservative, traditional views on marriage and family life. She is an active member of the Forum of German Catholics, a lay organization founded in opposition to the Central Committee of German Catholics. In 2014 she co-organized a bus tour to support heterosexual-only marriage in Germany with Austrian conservative activist Alexander Tschugguel.

Alongside Beatrix von Storch, she organized the Demo für Alle rallies, focused on protesting the 2015 education plan of the liberal government of Baden-Württemberg, same-sex marriage, "gender ideology", and demanding the protection of "traditional values". The protests turned violent and led to police arrests. An outspoken opponent of same-sex marriage and teaching gender studies in public schools, the LGBTQ network Enough is Enough! Open Your Mouth! accused her of using hatred and fear against LGBTQ people, referring to her as Miss Homophobia in 2015, stating that she is one of "the most active representatives of fear and hatred towards lesbians and gays in Germany." She has suggested that same-sex couples, unlike heterosexual couples, cannot be faithful for life.

On 18 January 2020 von Beverfoerde took part in a silent prayer protest in Munich to ask Pope Francis and the German Bishops' Conference for "clarity and coherence" and to end "dissimulation and deception" in the Catholic Church in Germany. She protested alongside other conservative Catholic leaders and activists including Tschugguel, Roberto de Mattei, Gabriele Kuby, and Archbishop Carlo Maria Viganò. The group, protesting under the name Acies Ordinata, included 130 members of the laity from Germany, Austria, Italy, Brazil, Chile, Canada, and the United States.

Von Beverfoerde serves on the advisory board for the online AfD affiliated online newspaper Freie Welt. and is chair of the AfD close association "Ehe-Familie-Leben e.V."

== Connection to a Putin-supporting oligarch ==
In 2022, the Green Party politician Andreas Audretsch claimed that von Beverfoerde's association which organizes demonstrations is closely linked to a Russian oligarch with close ties to Putin. This claim was met with opposition and an attempt was made in court to prohibit the claim. However, the court ruled that von Beverfoerde did have financial links to Konstantin Malofeev over the CitizenGo foundation.

== Personal life ==
Von Beverfoerde is married to Baron Josef von Elverfeldt Beverfoerde zu Werries, a businessman who owns a construction company in Magdeburg. Her husband's family, the Barons von Beverfoerde, are a cadet branch of the Elverfeldt family and are also a part of the German nobility. She and her husband have three children. A member of the Catholic Church in Germany, she served as chairwoman of the board of trustees of the Roman Catholic Diocese of Magdeburg's Edith-Stein School Foundation from 2002 until 2012.

In 2015, an arson attack was made against Von Beverfoerde and her family when a car was set on fire on the premises of her husband's business.
