= Hermann von Lüninck =

German agricultural expert and politician

Hermann Freiherrr von Lüninck

Oberpräsident, Rhine Province
- In office 25 March 1933 – 4 March 1935
- Preceded by: Johannes Fuchs
- Succeeded by: Josef Terboven

Personal details
- Born: 3 May 1893 Ostwig, Province of Westphalia, Kingdom of Prussia, German Empire
- Died: 16 May 1975 (aged 82) Engelskirchen, North Rhine-Westphalia, West Germany
- Party: German National People's Party
- Education: Ludwig-Maximilians-Universität München; University of Freiburg; University of Münster; University of Göttingen
- Profession: Lawyer

Military service
- Allegiance: German Empire
- Branch/service: Imperial German Army; Luftstreitkräfte
- Years of service: 1914–1918
- Rank: Oberleutnant
- Unit: Guards Rifles Battalion
- Battles/wars: World War I
- Awards: Iron Cross, 1st and 2nd class

Hermann Joseph Anton Maria Freiherr (Note: Regarding personal names: Freiherr is a former title (translated as Baron). In Germany since 1919, it forms part of family names. The feminine forms are Freifrau and Freiin.) von Lüninck (3 May 1893 – 16 May 1975) was a German lawyer and agricultural specialist who became the Oberpräsident (Senior President) of the Rhine Province in Nazi Germany. Arrested for involvement in the 20 July plot, he escaped execution.

== Family and early life ==
Lüninck was a member of an old Catholic Lower Rhine noble family. His father was the owner of a large estate and his elder brother Ferdinand von Lüninck later would become the Oberpräsident of the Province of Westphalia. In 1925, he married Ferdinandine Bertha Countess von und zu Westerholt and Gysenberg (1897–1945). The marriage produced seven children.

Lüninck studied law at the Ludwig-Maximilians-Universität München, the University of Freiburg, the University of Münster, and the University of Göttingen. After passing the preliminary state law examination in 1914, he volunteered for service with the Imperial German Army in the First World War. He served with the elite Guards Rifles Battalion and in the Luftstreitkräfte. He was wounded in action, earned the Iron Cross 1st and 2nd class and left the military in 1919 with the rank of Oberleutnant. In October 1920, Lüninck passed his Rechtassessor examination and worked from 1920 to 1922 as a lawyer in the Prussian Ministry of the Interior. From 1923 to 1925 he was deputy general secretary of the Rhenish Farmers' Association (Rhenische Bauernvereins) and in March 1925 he was elected president of the Rhenish Chamber of Agriculture (Rheinische Landwirtschaftskammer). In 1929, Lüninck also took on the office of president of the Rhenish Farmers' Association and of the Rhenish Agricultural League (Rheinischer Landbund) and, in 1931, that of president of the Rhenish Agricultural Cooperative Association (Rheinischer Landwirtschaftlichen Genossenschaftsverbands).

As a member of the conservative German National People's Party (DNVP) and with his multiple and influential agricultural positions in the early 1930s, Lüninck was repeatedly considered for the Reich Food and Agriculture Minister in any potential right-wing conservative government. On 3 June 1932, in a personal letter to the State Secretary in the Presidential Chancellery, Otto Meissner, Lüninck advocated including the Nazi Party in the Reich government. However, he refused to sign the industrial petition submitted by 19 representatives of industry, finance, and agriculture on 19 November 1932 that urged German President Paul von Hindenburg to appoint Adolf Hitler as German Chancellor.

== Career in Nazi Germany ==
In 1933 Lüninck gave up his agricultural posts when the Prussian Minister-President Hermann Göring appointed him Oberpräsident of the Rhine Province on 25 March 1933. This was a concession to the Nazis' coalition partner, the DNVP, since nearly all these posts were filled by a Nazi Party Gauleiter. On 12 October 1933, Göring also appointed Lüninck to the newly reconstituted Prussian State Council. However, Lüninck began to withdraw his support for the regime, shocked by the murders committed during the Röhm purge and by the persecution of the Catholic Church. After constant quarrels with the local Nazi leaders, Lüninck finally was removed as Oberpräsident on 4 March 1935 and replaced by the Party Gauleiter of Gau Essen, Josef Terboven. He also was removed from the Prussian State Council on 2 June 1937.

Lüninck, together with his brother Ferdinand, eventually became involved in the plans to overthrow the Nazi regime and he was slated to potentially head the Ministry of Agriculture in the government to be established following the planned assassination of Hitler. After the failure of the plot, Lüninck was arrested on 13 October 1944 while visiting his brother, who already was in custody. Ferdinand would be tried and executed in November for his role in the plot. Brought before the People's Court on 18 January 1945, Hermann's case was continued several times and finally dismissed; he was released from the Lehrter Straße prison on 22 April 1945.

== Post-war life ==
From 1945 until his death, he was chairman of the Garde-Schützen-Bund, an association of former members of the Prussian Guards Rifles Battalion. He ran unsuccessfully on the conservative German Right Party (DKP-DRP) list for a seat in the West German Bundestag in 1949. Hermann von Lüninck died on 16 May 1975 at Burg Alsbach on the outskirts of Engelskirchen.

== Sources ==
- Czichon, Eberhard (1967). Wer verhalf Hitler zur Macht? Zum Anteil der deutschen Industrie an der Zerstörung der Weimarer Republik. Köln: Pahl-Rugenstein. ISBN 3-7609-0042-9.
- Hermann Freiherr von Lüninck entry in the Deutsche Biographie
- Lilla, Joachim (2005). Der Preußische Staatsrat 1921–1933: Ein biographisches Handbuch. Düsseldorf: Droste Verlag. ISBN 978-3-770-05271-4.
