= Haus Ostwig =

Mansion in Bestwig, Germany

Coordinates: 51.3642°N 8.4146°E

Haus Ostwig is a manor house in Bestwig, Hochsauerlandkreis, Germany. The house, previously owned by the Hanxleden family, is now owned by the Lüninck family.

== History ==
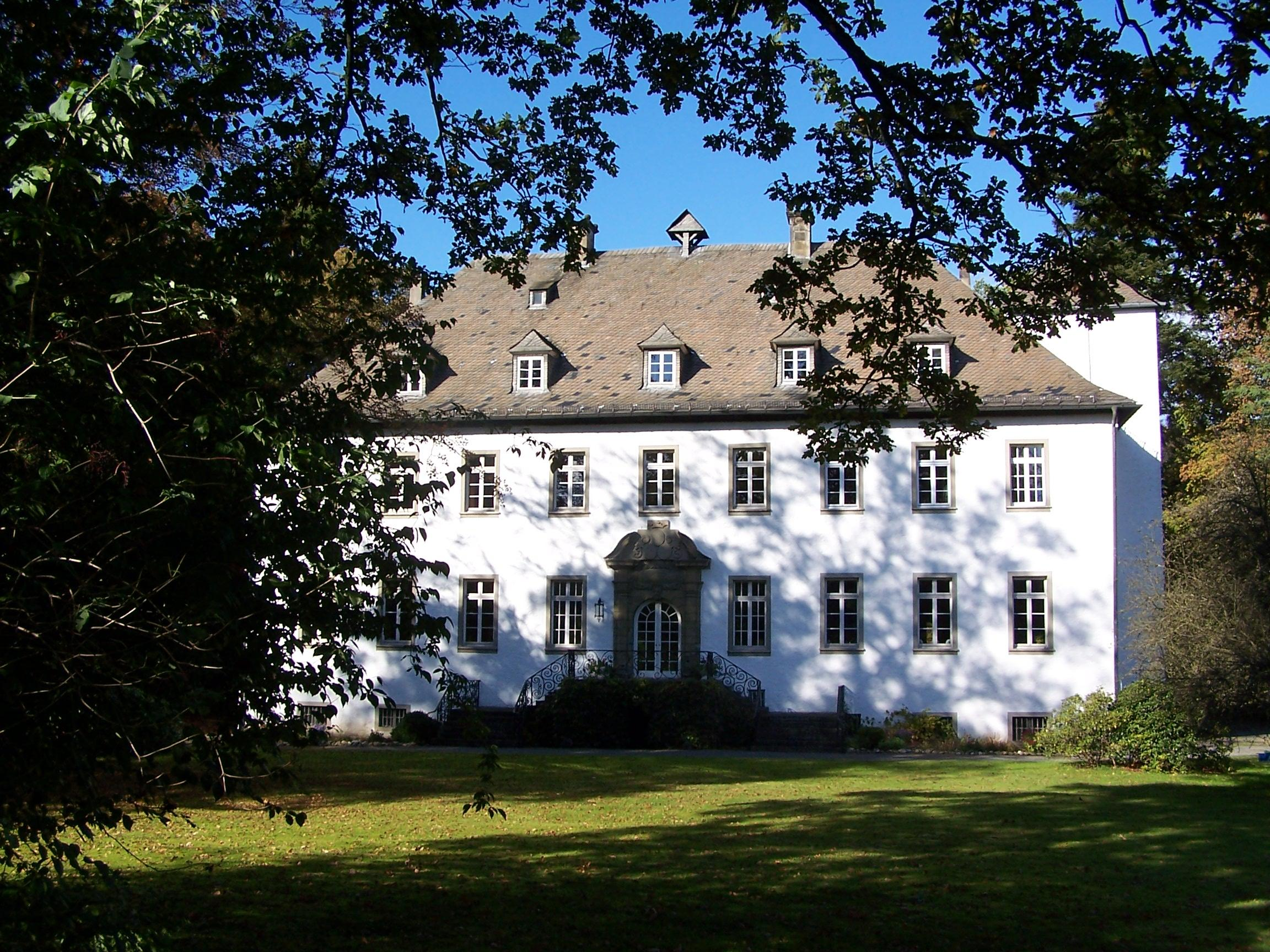
Ostwig House

The Ostwig Estate was first mentioned in a document from the Abbey Königsmünster in 1200. In 1299, Count Ludwig von Arnsberg purchased the estate. In the fifteenth century the house was constructed. In 1539 the manor was acquired by Johann von Hanxleden zu Anröchte. In the seventeenth century additions were made to the manor. In 1699, the property was combined with the Borg and Brockhausen estates. When the Ostwiger line of von Hanxlebens went extinct in 1771, the property passed to the Barons of Lüninck. Baron Ferdinand von Lüninck and Baroness Hedwig von Lüninck were both born in the house.

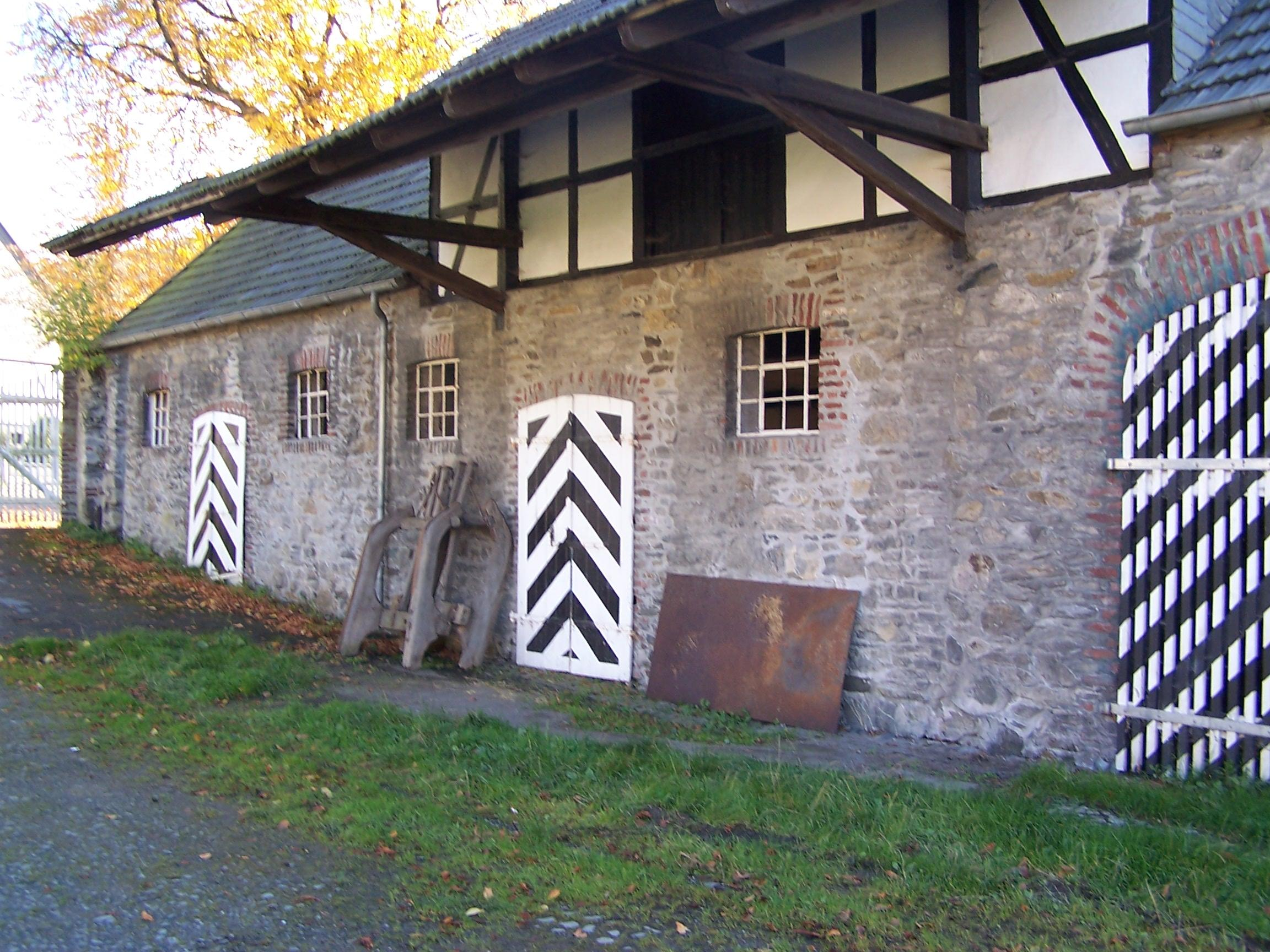
farm buildings on the estate
