= TOE, German Cavalry Division, August 1914 =

Cavalry Division (Kavallerie-Division)
- Flag of the Staff of a Division (1871–1918)
- Active: 1914–19
- Country: German Empire
- Branch: Army
- Type: Cavalry Division
- Size: Approximately 5,000 (on mobilisation)
- Engagements: World War I

This is an outline of the table of organization and equipment (TO&E) of the 11 German Cavalry Divisions that were established at the outbreak of World War I. This is the theoretical strength on mobilisation and did not remain constant. As early as 30 November 1914, the 3rd Cavalry Brigade became independent of the 4th Cavalry Division.

== Table of Organisation and Equipment ==
- Division Staff
  - "weaker than an infantry division"
- 3 x Brigade Staffs
- 6 x Cavalry Regiments (each of 4 squadrons)
  - 36 Officers, 688 NCOs and other ranks, 709 riding horses, 60 draught horses, 2 bridge wagons, 1 telephone wagon, 1 medical wagon, 5 baggage wagons, 5 supply wagons, 5 fodder wagons.
- Horse Artillery Abteilung
  - 24 officers, 573 NCOs and other ranks, 780 horses, 55 vehicles / wagons, 12 guns organised as
  - Staff
    - 8 officers, 30 NCOs and other ranks, 36 horses, 1 observation wagon, 1 supply wagon, 1 baggage wagon
  - 3 x Horse Artillery Batteries
    - 4 officers, 133 NCOs and other ranks, 180 horses, 4 guns (each drawn by 6 horses), 9 vehicles
  - Light Ammunition Column
    - 4 officers, 144 NCOs and other ranks, 204 horses, 25 vehicles including 7 infantry small arms ammunition wagons designated for the cavalry
- Machine Gun Detachment
  - 2 officers, 115 NCOs and other ranks, 27 riding horses, 60 draught horses, 15 vehicles including 6 MGs drawn by 4 horses, 1 reserve MG and 3 small arms ammunition wagons, 1 field kitchen, 1 store wagon, 1 fodder wagon, 1 baggage wagon
- Pioneer Detachment
  - 2 officers, 46 NCOs and other ranks, 31 horses, 6 pioneer wagons
- Signals Detachment
  - Heavy Wireless Station (2 in the 4th and Bavarian Cavalry Divisions)
    - 1 station wagon, 1 wireless mast wagon, 1 store wagon
  - 2 x Light Wireless Stations
    - 1 station wagon, 1 store wagon
- Cavalry Motorised Vehicle Column

=== Strength ===
The total strength of a division on mobilisation was at least 244 officers, 4862 NCOs and other ranks, 5512 horses (riding and draught) and 197 vehicles and wagons. It commanded 24 cavalry squadrons, 12 field artillery pieces and 6 machine guns.

== Jäger Battalions ==
The peacetime army contained 18 Jäger Battalions (Guards Jäger, Guards Schützen, 1st - 14th Jäger, and 1st and 2nd Bavarian Jäger). On mobilisations, these were attached to the cavalry corps and divisions. Each Jäger battalion consisted of:

- battalion staff
- 4 Jäger companies
  - 26 officers, 1054 NCOs and other ranks, 58 horses, 4 ammunition wagons, 1 medical wagon, 4 field kitchens, 5 baggage wagons and 5 supply wagons
- 1 machine gun company
  - 2 officers, 95 NCOs and other ranks, 45 horses, 6 machine guns, 1 reserve machine gun, 3 ammunition wagons, 1 field kitchen, 1 store wagons, 1 baggage wagon and 1 fodder wagon
- 1 cyclist company
  - 3 officers, 124 NCOs and other ranks
- a motorised vehicle column
  - 10 vehicles each with a driver and escort

They added considerable fire power to the cavalry.

== See also ==
- German Army (German Empire)
- German cavalry in World War I
- German Army order of battle (1914)

== Bibliography ==
- Cron, Hermann (2002). Imperial German Army 1914-18: Organisation, Structure, Orders-of-Battle [first published: 1937]. Helion & Co. ISBN 1-874622-70-1.
