= Julius von Groß genannt von Schwarzhoff =

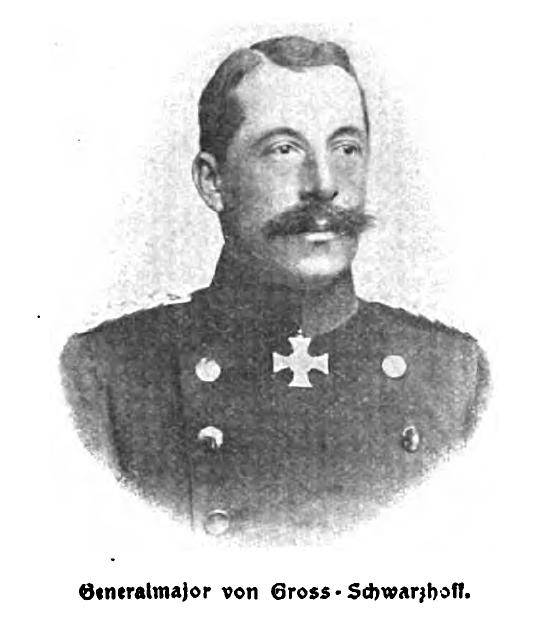
Julius Karl von Groß genannt von Schwarzhoff

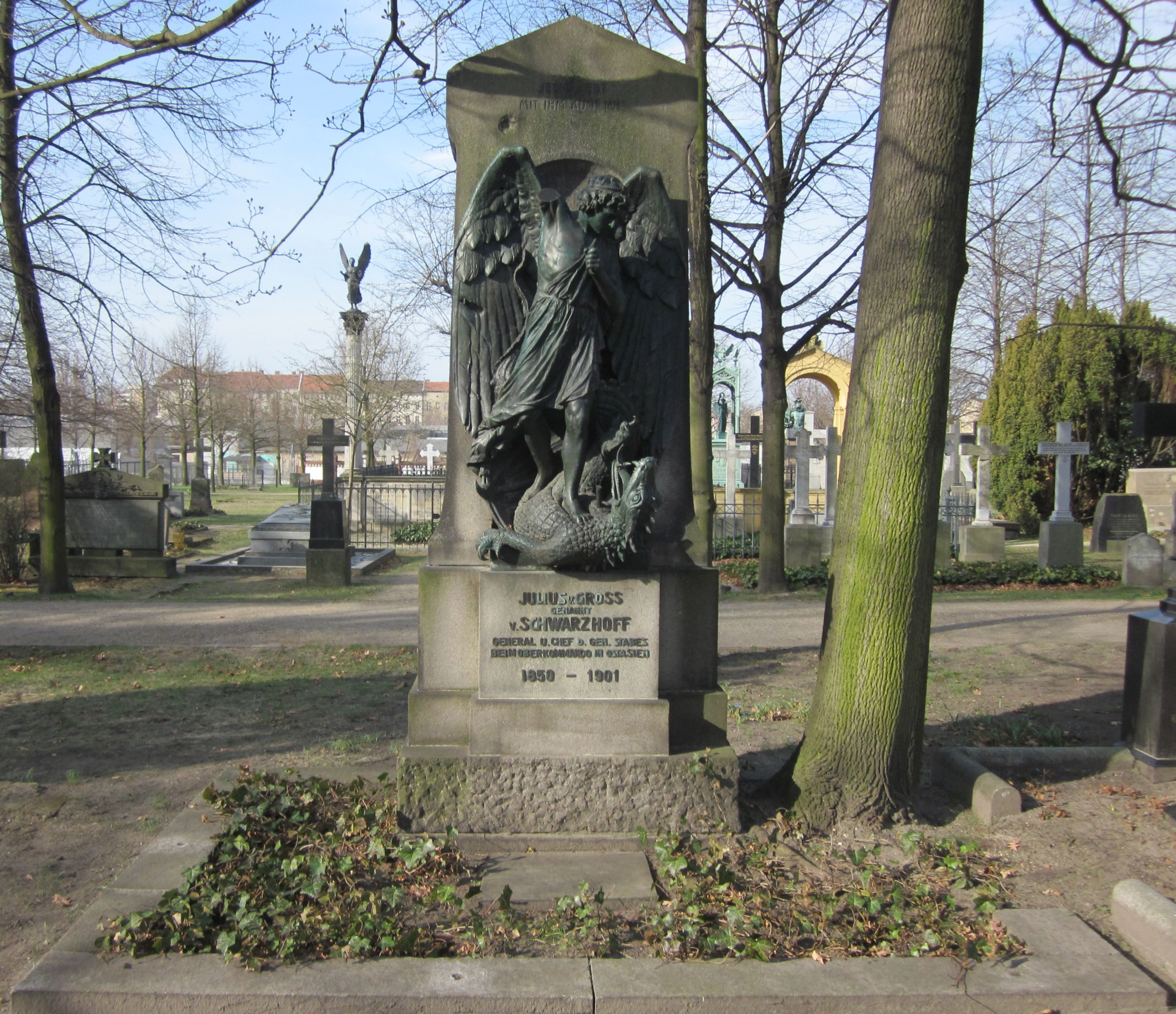
Grave of Julius von Groß in Invalidenfriedhof in Berlin

Julius Karl von Groß genannt von Schwarzhoff (September 7, 1850 in Magdeburg - April 16, 1901 in Beijing) was a Prussian major general and chief of staff of the Army High Command in East Asia.

== Biography ==
His parents were Prussian Infantry General Julius von Groß (1812–1881) and his wife Berta, née von Lettow (1821–1910). Due to the association of Prussian names and the coat of arms of the von Schwarzhoff family, he used the name "von Groß genannt von Schwarzhoff" from February 6, 1835 onwards. Dietrich Christoph von Groß gen. von Schwarzhoff was his uncle.

Groß attended high school in Magdeburg and, after graduating on April 1, 1870, joined the 2nd Foot Guard Regiment of the Prussian Army. During the war against France, he took part in the battles at St. Privat, Beaumont, and Sedan, as well as the siege of Paris. Awarded the Iron Cross II Class, he attended the Prussian Staff College in Berlin for three years from 1874, where he demonstrated a talent for foreign languages. Transferred to the Guards Rifles Battalion on January 2, 1878, he was promoted to first lieutenant in 1879 and sent to Switzerland to take part in maneuvers in 1879. Assigned to the General Staff in May 1880, he was promoted to Hauptmann in 1882.

From 1885 to 1887, Groß was assigned to the embassy in Paris and served as military advisor to the German ambassador Georg Herbert zu Münster during the deliberations at the Hague Peace Conference. The influence he exerted during the negotiations was significant, as he was able to shed light on all aspects of the issues at hand, both as a soldier and as a politician. His statements, in which he convincingly explained his views on the issue of disarmament to the assembly in French, contributed most to its ultimate rejection. His proposals for the expansion of the Geneva Convention, which he made there, were also very noteworthy. The Faculty of Law at the University of Königsberg awarded him an honorary doctorate for his work. After being relieved of his command, Groß was transferred to Cologne on October 22, 1887, as company commander in the 5th Rhenish Infantry Regiment No. 65. With his promotion to major on November 13, 1888, he was transferred to the Great General Staff and reassigned to the General Staff of the Army. After various general staff assignments, Groß served as colonel and commander of the Grand Duke of Saxony (5th Thuringian) Infantry Regiment No. 94 from July 20, 1897, to April 17, 1900. He was then promoted to major general and transferred to Altona as commander of the 33rd Infantry Brigade.

Following the suppression of the Boxer Rebellion, Groß was given command of the 1st East Asian Infantry Brigade on July 9, 1900, and shortly thereafter, on August 12, 1900, he was appointed Chief of Staff of the East Asian Expeditionary Corps. His position in the Far East was a very difficult one. However, he had an astonishing ability to bring the allies together to act in concert, despite their many divergent aspirations. Groß died on April 16, 1901, in the fire at the Winter Palace in Beijing,, which served as the headquarters of the army high command. His remains were transferred to Germany and buried in the Invalidenfriedhof in Berlin.

Field Marshal von Waldersee said of him: "Appointed by His Majesty to the position of Chief of Staff of the Army High Command in East Asia, he fulfilled his difficult role with rare dedication, clear, comprehensive intellect, and outstanding military and diplomatic knowledge, and through his personal kindness and genuine camaraderie, he earned the love and trust of all who came into contact with him. The Army High Command mourns with the army the loss of one of the best!"
