= Schloss Körtlinghausen =

- Soest (district), North Rhine-Westphalia Germany
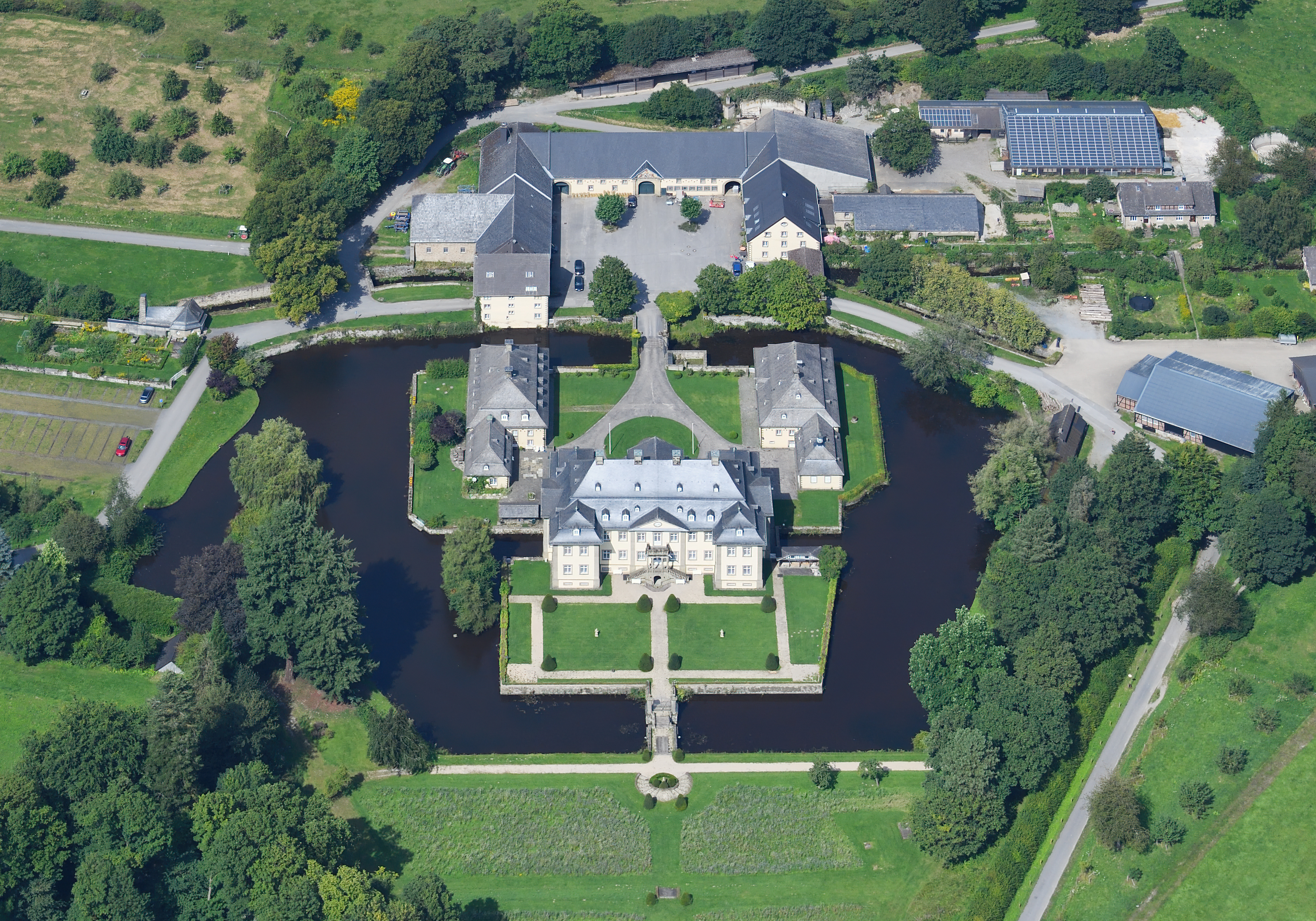
- Schloss Körtlinghausen from the south 2024

Site information
- Type: Château (Schloss / Moated manor house)
- Condition: Restored

Location
- Coordinates: 51°27′41″N 8°24′37″E

Site history
- Built: 1746 (present version)
- Architect: Justus Wehmer

Schloss Körtlinghausen is a Baroque Schloss (château) in Germany's Sauerland region, roughly equidistant between Dortmund and Kassel. It is sited on the southern bank of the River Glenne and it is surrounded by a moat.

Beyond the moat it one of the country's largest and oldest Oak trees, which is more than a thousand years old. The circumference of the trunk just above ground level is 12.4 m (41 ft).

== History ==
The first documented mention of a castle on the site dates from 1398.

The current château replaced an earlier previous moated fortress. The manor belonged to the von Schorlemer and the von Rüdenberg families till 1447 when it was acquired by the von Lürwalds. They were followed by the von Hanxleden who were in their turn succeeded by the von Westrems in 1614. Between 1645 and 1819 it belonged to the von Weichs family.

In 1714 Franz Otto von und zu Weichs instructed the architect Justus Wehmer to construct a replacement château in the fashionable Baroque style, and the new building was completed in 1746. The von Fürstenbergs acquired it in 1830: it has remained in this family since that time.

In 1945 the château was occupied by the British and became as a holding centre for refugees rendered homeless by ethnic cleansing after large parts of eastern Germany had been transferred to Poland and the Soviet Union under the terms of an agreement between the United States, the Soviet Union and their allies. Between 1956 and 1994 it was rented out for use as a training school for the Bundesverband für den Selbstschutz ("National Self-defence Association"). Between 1999 and 2004 the château underwent an extensive restoration under the direction of the then owner, Baron Dietger von Fürstenberg, whose work earned him a prize for Historic preservation. In order to finance the work the baron sold a twelfth century German manuscript document, known as the Stammheim Missal, and which had been in his family for generations, to the Getty Museum in Los Angeles.

Today the château is made available for conferences, receptions and other large functions. Buildings on the north side house administrative operations for the house and its farm estate.

== Description ==
=== Exterior ===
The site comprises a rectangular manor house with two detached wings, one on each side, to the north of the main building. Between them these form three sides of a four sided courtyard. To the north of that runs part of the moat, across which a continuation of the courtyard is flanked by the stable block. Within the moat, the principal island is the one on which the mansion and its detached wings stand: there is also a small "unbuilt" island to the west of that.

The windows of the simple rendered building are framed in sandstone. On the main building the lines of the hipped roof are interrupted by gable windows, and the roof is topped off with four substantial chimney blocks. On each of the long sides of the court-yard ("Cour d'honneur"), it is rimmed by two short pavilion-like detached wings. On the garden (south) side the double steps approaching the main arched entrance are inscribed with the date, 1721. On the court-yard side the main entrance of the main building is topped of with a double double coats of arms of the von Weichs and (in the eighteenth century, neighbouring) von Droste zu Erwitte aristocratic families.

=== Interior ===
The main double staircase leads to the first floor via a raised mezzanine halfway up A large ground floor reception room, with rich stucco decoration and frescoes on the ceiling, overlooks the park. The coat of arms of the Baron von Weichs who had the château built is prominently displayed along with those of each of his three successive wives.

=== Chapel ===
The chapel is directly accessible from either of the building's two main floors. The ceiling is decorated with a geometrical stucco design incorporating the image of Mary Magdalene, to whom the chapel is dedicated. The ceiling was painted in 1727. The altar dates from 1739. The raised box (literally "patronal loggia"), constructed to be occupied by the lord of the manor and his family during services, is particularly eye-catching.
