= Stammheim Missal =

12th c. illuminated manuscript

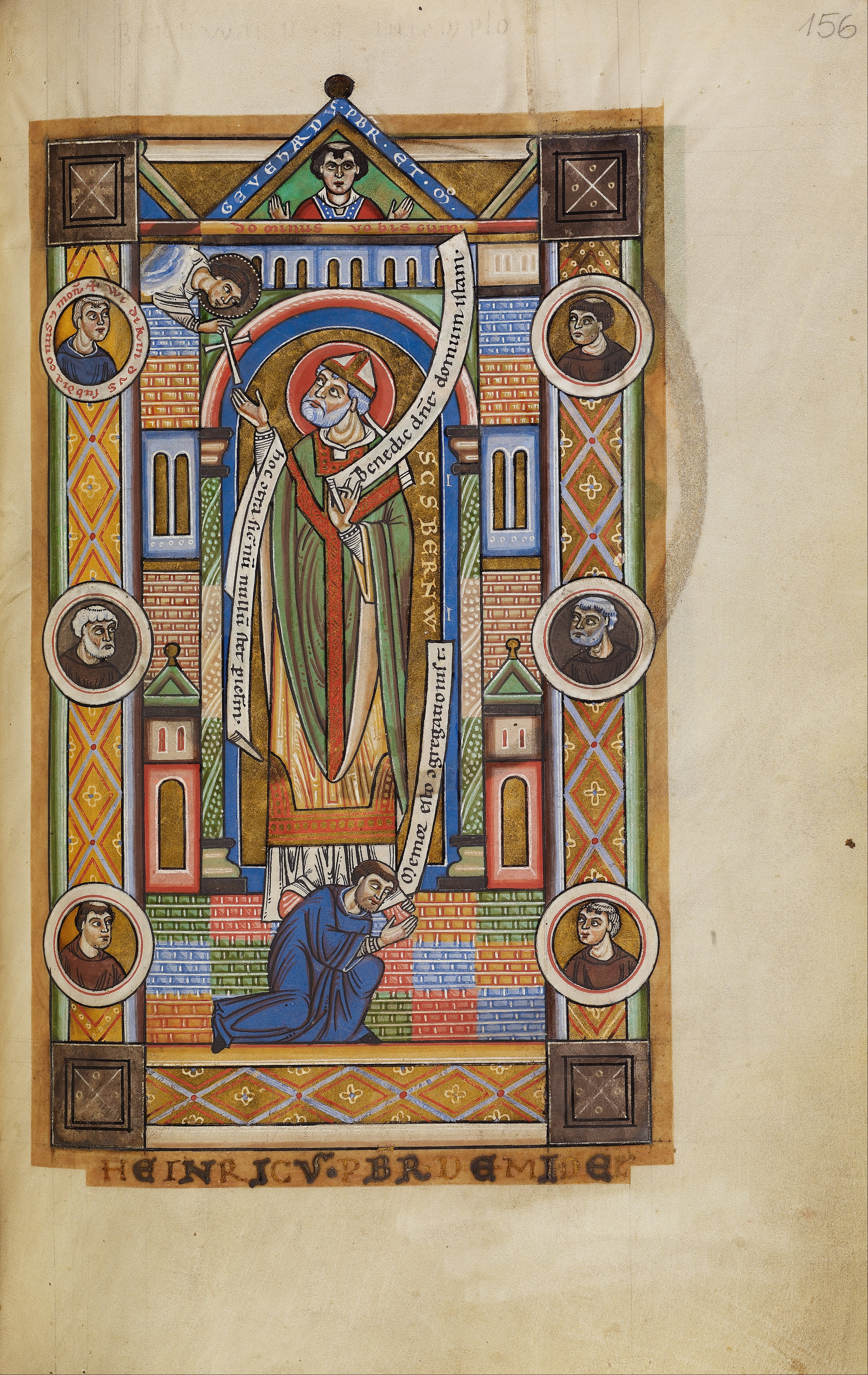
St Bernward of Hildesheim

The Stammheim Missal is an illuminated manuscript Roman Missal made between 1160 and 1170. It is now in the J. Paul Getty Museum, having been acquired from the private collection of the barons of Fürstenberg, who sold it to raise funds to repair Schloss Körtlinghausen. A Carolingian ivory diptych had been used for its binding, but was removed in 1904 and was in the State Museums of Berlin until 1945, when it disappeared during the bombing of Berlin in World War II.

It was produced by the priest Henricus of Middel for Hildesheim Abbey, and was later held at Stammheim Castle. It was made in the same era as the Ratmann Sacramentary. It is richly decorated with full-page miniatures, including one showing Bernward of Hildesheim (died 1022, subject of a local cult from 1150 and formally canonised in 1192).
