= Schützen (military) =

German infantrymen used in a light-infantry or skirmishing role

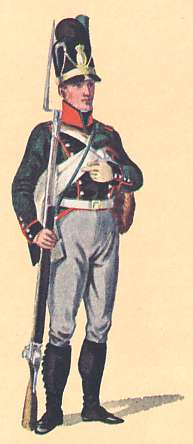
A Bavarian schütze, 1806.

Schützen (lit. 'shooters', but usually translated as "marksmen") is a German plural noun used to designate a type of military unit of infantrymen, originally armed with a rifled musket and used in a light-infantry or skirmishing role – and hence similar to the Jäger. The individual infantrymen are termed Schütze. Prior to the introduction of firearms the word was used for 'archer', and is sometimes used in the form Bogenschütze (bowman – lit. 'bow shooter').

The verb schützen (to protect) is not related to the plural noun Schützen, but to "Schutz" (protection).

== Translation and usage ==
The German word Schütze means 'one who shoots'; the most common English translations are 'rifleman' or 'marksman'. (The word is related to schießen, 'shoot'; the compound Scharfschütze means sharpshooter or sniper; Schützengraben means a trench from which infantrymen shoot; other related words are Geschütz, a piece of artillery, and its compounds, such as Sturmgeschütz, 'assault gun' (a type of armored vehicle used as self-propelled artillery and originally intended for infantry support). Schuetze is the correct variant spelling without the umlaut. Schütze is not to be confused with the noun Schutz, meaning 'guard', 'protection' or 'defence' (as in the compounds Zivilschutz, 'Civil Defence', and Bundesgrenzschutz, 'Federal Border Protection' or 'Border Guard' or Schutzstaffel (SS) 'Guard Echelon').

The rank of Schütze was used for 'Private' in the Imperial German Machine Gun Abteilungen (independent horse-drawn Machine Gun detachments) and for the Saxon Schützen (Fusilier) Regiment No 108. During the First World War the term became more widespread in the Imperial German Army, when it was applied to dismounted Cavalry Divisions, the Kavallerie-Schützen-Division. The Imperial German Colonial Infantry were referred to as Schutztruppe, however this is translated as 'defence troops' and is not related to the Schützen.

The Wehrmacht (or more correctly Heer – the army of the Third Reich) and the Waffen-SS, adopted the rank title Schütze for an infantry private (still used in the present day Bundeswehr), and therefore perhaps the best translation is 'rifleman' (or for the plural noun, as in British military usage, 'Rifles', e.g. 'Queen Victoria’s Rifles') with the additional sense of 'sharpshooter' or 'marksman'. The French equivalent is Tirailleur.

When Germany first introduced Motorised Infantry in the 1930s those regiments that were the Infantry component of the Panzer Divisions, prior to being known as Panzer Grenadiers (from 1942), were termed 'Schützen Regimenter' (organised into 'Schützen Brigaden'). Some were cavalry in origin (belonging to Divisions that had originally been 'Light Divisions'), and carried on the designation used in the First World War – Kavallerie-Schützen-Regiment. Sometimes these designations persisted after the official change to Panzer Grenadier.

In the modern German Bundeswehr the infantry fighting vehicle of the Panzer Grenadier units was, until 1971, the Schützenpanzer HS30 (Infantry fighting vehicle HS30 – verbatim: riflemen tank).

== History in Germany ==
Schützen originated in the Prussian Army from 1787 as 10 hand-picked soldiers from each Company of each Line Regiment (8 companies), each Grenadier Battalion (4 companies) and each Fusilier Battalion (4 companies). For the line infantry and Grenadiers, the Schützen were drawn from the 'third rank' – men who were trained in skirmishing. The Fusiliers, a term in Germany that denoted Light Infantry, were all trained skirmishers. The skirmishers' role was to precede the main body in 'open order', forming a protective screen and firing at the enemy in a way designed to gall and disrupt – and also to form a defensive screen to counter the enemy's skirmishers. This inevitably led to the selection of men who were superior marksmen, to be armed with rifled weapons (shorter than a musket and sometimes referred to as 'carbines') and charged specifically with the task of killing or disabling enemy officers or NCOs – thus undermining the cohesion and steadiness of the enemy ranks. The numbers may seem few, and in practice the Prussians found they had insufficient numbers (even though the Fusilier Schützen had been increased from 10 to 22 in 1798), but even when used in large numbers the methodology was to have only a small proportion of them rotated so that they would not run out of ammunition, and so they could always fall back on the main body when threatened by cavalry. As Light Infantry the Fusiliers had greater flexibility, and methods that were appropriate for what was termed 'outpost warfare' – fighting in woodland and villages, covering the flanks or assaulting over broken terrain and defensive earthworks. This included 'Skirmish Attacks', in which the skirmish lines operated offensively, and in greater numbers. Two entire companies – half the strength of the Fusilier battalion – were utilized, with the remaining two available as support or relief.

Over time, after the end of the Napoleonic Wars, the Schützen developed many similarities with the Jäger and eventually began to be grouped together in companies (although still integral within an Infantry battalion or regiment) and/or distinguished by special uniform features. One such feature (often also worn by Jäger and in Austria also) endured in many of the German states, on through the Imperial German Army, the Wehrmacht and continuing right up until the present Bundeswehr. This is known as the Schützenschnur (lit. 'shooter-cord') – a braided 'lanyard' denoting a marksman and worn slung from the shoulder, across the breast and secured at a tunic button. Often it was green, and also embellished by being terminated with tassels, pompoms or 'acorns'.

Schützen companies were found, for example, in Bavaria, Mecklenburg, Anhalt, Hesse-Darmstadt and Nassau but as these States gradually entered the German Confederation under Prussia, and adopted the Prussian model (except Bavaria which remained a distinct entity), the Schützen disappeared or were absorbed by the Jäger. At the same time there was a tendency for the Jäger to be converted to the third (Fusilier) Battalion of the Line Infantry Regiments (the Jäger only remained as distinct entities in Prussia, Saxony, Mecklenburg and Bavaria). This trend coincided with the beginnings of industrialised warfare and the general introduction of rifled weapons, eventually being breech-loading.

For example, in the Kingdom of Württemberg from 1842 each infantry company had, in wartime, 10 Scharfschützen, 50 Schützen and 220 musketeers (this can be interpreted as 10 sharpshooters or marksmen, 50 riflemen and 220 infantrymen). When Württemberg adopted the Minié Rifle for the entire infantry in 1855, these distinctions ceased, and the existing Schützen were used, in 1857, to create three Jäger Battalions.

This meant that small groups of specialised infantries trained to use rifles were redundant, as all infantrymen were now riflemen, and their training and tactics were the same, regardless of what they were called. These old specialist names became honorific or denoted an historic elite status (e.g. Fusiliers, Grenadiers, Light Infantry etc.). An exception to this is the Jäger, who maintained their elite specialist status by adopting roles such as mountain warfare (the Alpenkorps created in 1915), which continued until the second world war with the Gebirgsjäger (1938), Skijäger (1943) and especially with the creation of the Fallschirmjäger (1935).

The use of rifled breech-loaders also meant that soldiers could reload their weapons while prone and, with the adoption of smokeless powder, the idea of a marksman who was able to remain concealed gradually evolved into the modern sniper.

By 1870 only the Bavarian and Prussian armies contained Schützen; in Bavaria as integral companies, in Prussia as an independent battalion.

Schützen Battalions first appeared as part of the Prussian Army in 1808, and there were only ever a few such battalions in existence. Outside of Prussia only Hesse-Cassel (until 1926 the official spelling of 'Kassel' was 'Cassel'), Saxony and Saxe-Meiningen ever raised Schützen Battalions. Hesse-Cassel formed two battalions in 1832 from their Garde-Jäger-Bataillon and the Fusilier Battalion of the 2nd Line Infantry Regiment. In 1834 these changed to a Jäger Battalion and a Schützen Battalion – the latter converting again in 1852 back to Fusiliers, and in 1856 briefly becoming 'Light Infantry' (Leichte Infanterie) before again being known as Schützen. Both the Jäger and the Schützen were disbanded in 1867 – after Hesse-Cassel was defeated and annexed by Prussia – to be re-embodied in the newly raised Prussian 11th Jäger Battalion (Hessian). The Saxon units had an equally chequered history. In 1793 each infantry regiment established Scharfschützen (Sharpshooters) similar to the Prussians. In 1809 these were grouped together in two battalions, each of four Scharfschützen-Abteilungen (Sharpshooter Detachments). Within a few months they reorganised, firstly into a Jäger-Korps and then into two Light Infantry Regiments and a Jäger Battalion. In 1815, with the loss of territory to Prussia (because Saxony had been unable to break from its alliance to Napoleonic France), many of the personnel transferred to the Prussian Army – leaving only two Light Battalions and the Jäger Battalion, with the Light Battalions being re-designated as Schützen Battalions. In 1821 the Jäger Battalion became the 3rd Schützen Battalion and in 1849 a fourth Battalion was raised for the creation of a 'Light Brigade', in line with the general reorganisation of the Saxon Army from regiments (of two battalions each) into Brigades (of four Battalions each). Finally in 1853 the Light Brigade became a Jäger Brigade of four Jäger Battalions, and in 1867 – as with the Hessians after being defeated by the Prussians – the Saxon Army was reorganized along Prussian lines, with two of the Jäger Battalions becoming the 12th and 13th in the Prussian sequence, and the other two forming a regiment that became the 108th Infantry Regiment in the Prussian sequence. In 1827 the former 'Musketeer Battalion' (3 Companies) of the Duchy of Saxe-Meiningen was reformed as a Shützen Battalion but again this was short-lived, becoming in 1853 a 'Fusilier Battalion' (and in 1855 a Fusilier Regiment of two battalions).

From 1820 the 4 infantry regiments of the Grand Duchy of Hesse (Hesse-Darmstadt) each had 1 Schützen company, which in 1861 were grouped into a 'Provisional Shützen-Corps' (essentially a battalion except by name). In 1866 this became a 'Scharfschützen Corps', and in 1871 was converted to 2 Jäger battalions.

The first Prussian Schützen Battalion was recruited from the province of Silesia. A second Battalion (the Guards Rifles Battalion, Garde-Schützen-Bataillon) was raised in 1814 from the Swiss canton of the Principality of Neuchâtel (which from 1707 to 1800 and from 1814 to 1848 was ruled in personal union by the Berlin Hohenzollern), and in 1815 a third battalion was formed in the Rhineland (from Schützen personnel in the territories newly acquired by Prussia after Napoleon's downfall – e.g. the Grand-Duchy of Berg). The Prussian Army from 1815 thus contained:

- Guard Schützen Battalion
- Silesian Schützen Battalion No. 1
- Rhenish Schützen Battalion No. 2

While Schützen originally wore the uniform of the unit they belonged to, with the addition of the Schützenschnur, the Schützen Battalions, as units in their own right, adopted the green uniform of the Jäger but with the traditional red facings of the Jäger changed to black with red piping.

Although similar to the Jäger, the Schützen had a distinct character. Intended as fusilier-style skirmishers but with highly developed marksmanship, they were unable to operate with the same degree of independence and initiative as practised by the Jäger. In the Prussian Army the Schützen were phased out between 1821 and 1845, being converted to Jäger – leaving only the Garde-Schützen-Bataillon, which thus became the only unit in the Prussian Army with that designation; and although only titular, this unit preserved the tradition of the original Schützen (including retaining the black facings with red piping). However those Jäger Battalions that had a Schützen origin (Battalions 5–8) also carried on the tradition in subtle ways, and it may be through their links with the mountainous regions of Switzerland, Bavaria and Silesia that the Jäger also adopted techniques and skills of mountaineering (cf. the Austrian Mountain Troops, the Landesschützen or the Bavarian tradition of the Gebirgsschützen). While the Jäger had links with woodlands and hunting, the Schützen had links with uplands and alpine pursuits.

In the Imperial German Army prior to World War I, there was only one Schützen Battalion, the Garde-Schützen-Battaillon, plus an infantry regiment from Saxony that, while designated 'Schützen', was a special case.

== History in other countries ==
United States Sharpshooters During the American Civil War two regiments of Sharpshooters were raised in 1861 by the Union Army. Commanded by Hiram Berdan, himself a noted marksman who had been actively involved in their recruitment – they were thus popularly known as Berdan’s Sharpshooters. Recruited from picked marksmen, employed as snipers and skirmishers, like the German Schützen they often bore their own personal weapons and were dressed (uniquely for American regular military units) in dark green.

Austrian Schützen

Tiroler Landesschützen later known as Kaiserschützen

United Kingdom Sharpshooters

Yeomanry Regiment

French Tirailleurs
