= Hanxleden =

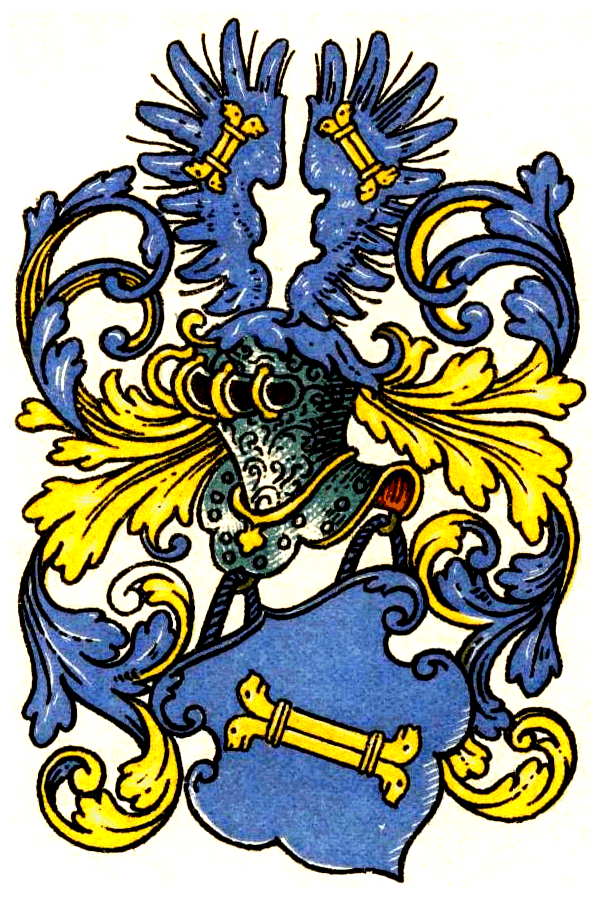
Von Hanxleden coat of arms

The Hanxleden family is a Westphalian noble family whose seat is the village of Hanxleden, today part of Schmallenberg in the district of Hochsauerland in Germany. In the 14th and 15th centuries the family provided several bailiffs (Amtmänner) of Fredeburg.

== History ==
=== Family tree ===
Siegfried von Hanxleden (b about 1180, d after 1279) lived as knight (Ritter) in Hanxleden and took part in the Fifth Crusade from 1217 to 1221. After his return he founded, together with his neighbour, the Lord (Herrn) of Sögtrop, a church and a rectorate on the common estate boundary, from which the village of Kirchrarbach developed.

Albert von Hanxleden (b about 1200), was mentioned about 1216 and may have been his son.

Johann I von Hanxleden (b about 1260) was mentioned in 1326 and may have been a grandson of Albert von Hanxledens.

Goddert I von Hanxleden (b about 1290) was 1327-1358 mentioned. He was Lord (Burgmann) of Grevenstein, Fredeburg and Schwarzenberg as well as bailiff (Gograf) of Attendorn. His wife was called Cunigunde.

Johann II von Hanxleden (b 1315, d n. 1374) was bailiff (Amtsmann) and Lord (Burgmann) of Fredeburg. He was married to Catharina von Plettenberg-Bamenohl (b ca. 1315).

Goddert II von Hanxleden (b about 1340, d 1410) was Lord (Burgmann) of Grevenstein and Fredeburg, Drost in Nyle (now part of Roermond) in the Duchy of Jülich. About 1390 he married Catharina von Hatzfeld zu Wildenburg.

Hunold von Hanxleden (b ca. 1390, d 1438) was bailiff of Fredeburg and Lord (Herr) of Bödefeld. In 1410 he was granted permission by the Electorate of Cologne to build Bödefeld castle. Construction lasted from 1425 to 1428. His first marriage was to Beleke von Huckelheim and his second was to Gertrude von der Elpe. In 1452 he died and was buried in the Church of St Walburga in Meschede.

Johann III von Hanxleden (b ca. 1410, d 1486), second son of Hunold and Beleke, was Lord (Herr) of Körtlinghausen Castle and in Kallenhardt as well as the Drost of Brilon. In about 1448 he married Margarethe von Hatzfeld.

Wigand von Hanxleden (about 1440–1501) was Lord (Herr) of Kallenhardt, Drost of Erwitte and on the Electorate of Cologne in 1483. His wife was Elisabeth von Hörde.

Johann IV von Hanxleden (about 1477-about 1560), Lord (Herr) of Körtlinghausen was married to Elisabeth von Kettler, heiress of Herdringen Castle. He had the Hanxleden manor house (Gräftenhof) built there about 1501 on an artificial island south of the bailey of the now ruined Kettelburg castle. In 1536 the County of Waldeck pledged the Assinghauser Grund to Hanxleden. This pledge expired 15 years later.

Wigand II. von Hanxleden (b about 1504, d 1576), Lord (Herr) of Körtlinghausen and Herdringen, was married in 1543 to Gertrude von Schorlemmer. The pair had seven children.

Georg Rombert von Hanxleden (b about 1540, d 1609) their eldest son, was marshal of the Teutonic Knights in Marburg in 1562, Komtur in 1581 in Ottmarsheim and Landkomtur of the Westphalian chapter of the Teutonic Knights in 1582.

Elisabeth von Hanxleden, daughter from Georg Rombert's marriage to Walburga auf der Ham, married 1599 in Mülheim an der Möhne the Rentmeister of Bilstein, Ludwig von Stockhausen.

=== Hanxleden of Bödefeld (line extinct) ===
Dietrich von Hanxleden (b about 1431), son of Hunold von Hanxleden's second marriage to Gertrude von der Elpe, inherited Bödefeld Castle and married Anna von Bruch about 1470.

Their successor Johann von Hanxleden was the last knight of the castle. About 1540 he founded the village of "Lichtenscheid", today Altastenberg, part of Winterberg, where he settled charcoal burners and herdsmen. As a result, he ended up in conflict with the townsfolk of Winterberg, who claimed the land. The region paid taxes to the Electorate of Cologne until it was dissolved.

Johann had a daughter Anna and an illegitimate son Jürgen. After his death in about 1550 the castle was enfeoffed to the family of his son-in-law, the Knight von Dersch.

=== Hanxleden of Anröchte (line extinct) ===
Johann von Hanxleden of Anröchte took over the estate of Haus Ostwig, today part of the municipality of Bestwig, in 1539. The family had their seat there and built the house in the 17th century into an impressive manor. In 1771 the Ostwig line of the Hanxledens died out and the estate went to the family of the barons von Lüninck.

== Other bearers of the name ==
b Johann Ernst von Hanxleden (1681-1732) Jesuit, missionary in India, philologist and Sanskrit researcher

b Reinhard von Hanxleden (b ca. 1957), computer scientist, lecturer at Kiel University

b Leopold Freiherr von Hanxleden, canon in Passau in 1790, owner of the Haidenhof Nord hunting lodge
