= Justus Wehmer =

German master builder

Justus Wehmer (ca.1690 - 1750) was a German master builder of the Baroque era. He was the architect of the (subsequently largely destroyed) eighteenth century Hildesheim Cathedral and surrounding buildings. He was also responsible for the design of various town houses and manor houses in Westphalia.

== Life ==
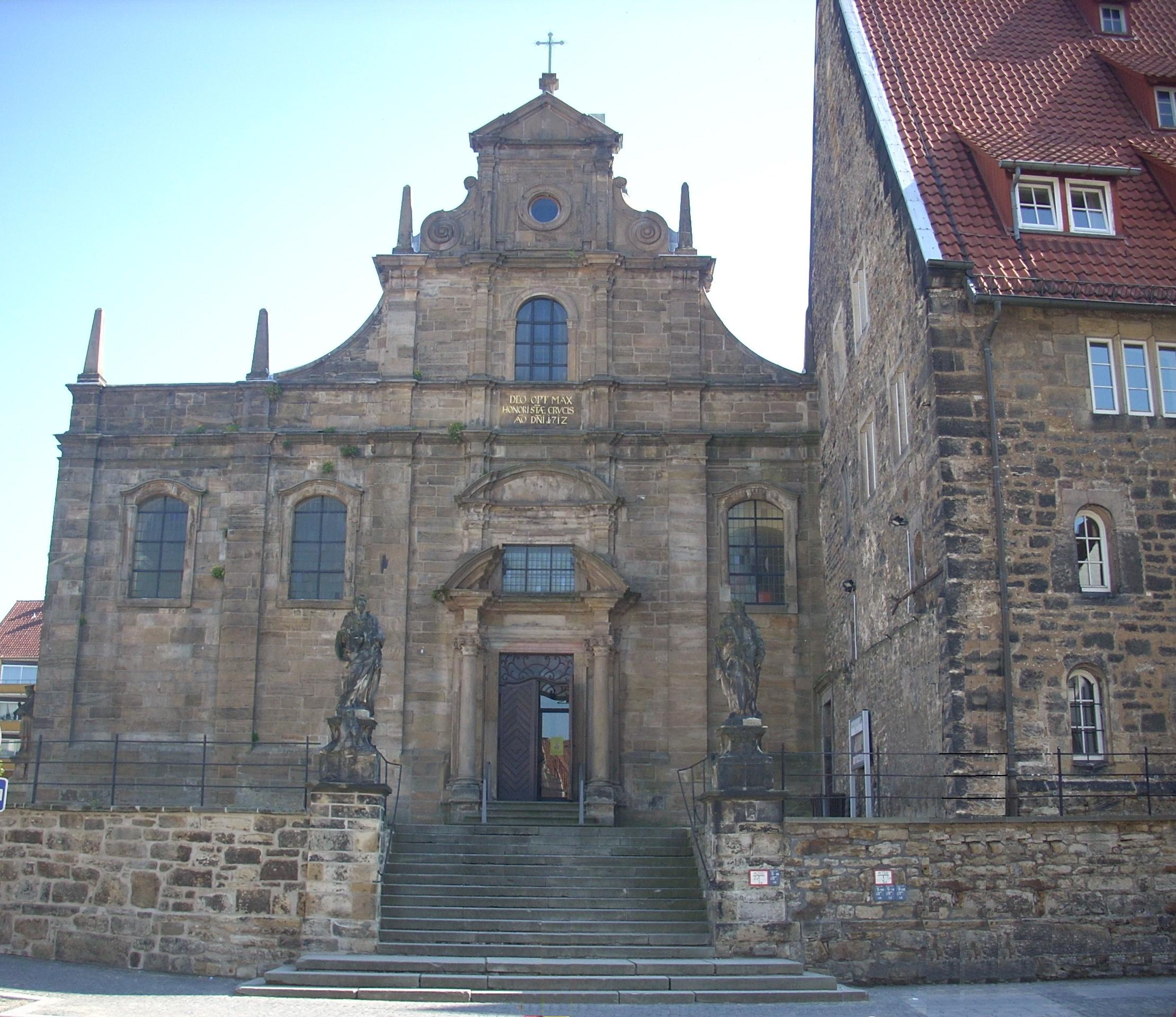
West front of the Church of the Holy Cross in Hildesheim

Aside from his work, little is known of Wehmer's life. He probably came originally from Darmstadt or Mannheim. He took his inspiration from architects such as Hermann Korb, Remy de la Fosse and Sudfeld Vick, and from the theoretician Leonhard Christoph Sturm.

His first significant appearance comes in the Bishopric of Hildesheim, starting in 1708. In 1712 he was responsible for the west front of the Church of the Holy Cross in Hildesheim itself. His first work covering a complete site was Schloss Körtlinghausen on which he started working in 1713. Almost at the same time he constructed Schloss Vinsebeck nearby. Both these chateaux-manor houses was inspired by French architectural fashions of the time, and used an "H-plan" footprint. Some of the original stucco interior decoration can still be seen at Vinsebeck.

In 1717 or 1718 he was called back to Hildesheim in order to assess the state of the cathedral and restore it appropriately. His recommendations included reconstructing the quadrangle in front of the building. On the inside he had also, by 1722, recreated the choir and the nave, together with other artists. Unhappily, very little of this work survived allied bombing raids during the early months of 1945.

The Prince-bishop of Hildesheim, Clemens August of Bavaria, sent Johann Conrad Schlaun to reconstruct the episcopal chancelry building. The contract was delegated to Wehmer. He managed the reconfiguration of Auxiliary bishop's residence. Also in 1729 he built the curia chamber for the cathedral cantor, Johann Bernhard Joseph von Weichs. He had already worked for von Weichs' family on the Schloss Körtlinghausen. The curia building was later adapted for use as the episcopal college. It seems likely that Wehmer was responsible for the new provost's residence in 1730. There were also numerous other more minor contracts, including extension work on the Brabeck Palace (later the bishop's palace).

A few years later Wehmer constructed Schloss Herringhausen and Schloss Vörden, applying a style noticeably different from that used for his earlier work. However, between 1734 and 1737, he built Schloss Welda, using a layout and design that closely echoed his design for Schloss Vinsebeck. The carriage house and the main portal at Corvey are also Wehmer's work.
