= Ferdinand von Lüninck =

German government official (1888–1944)

Ferdinand Freiherrr von Lüninck
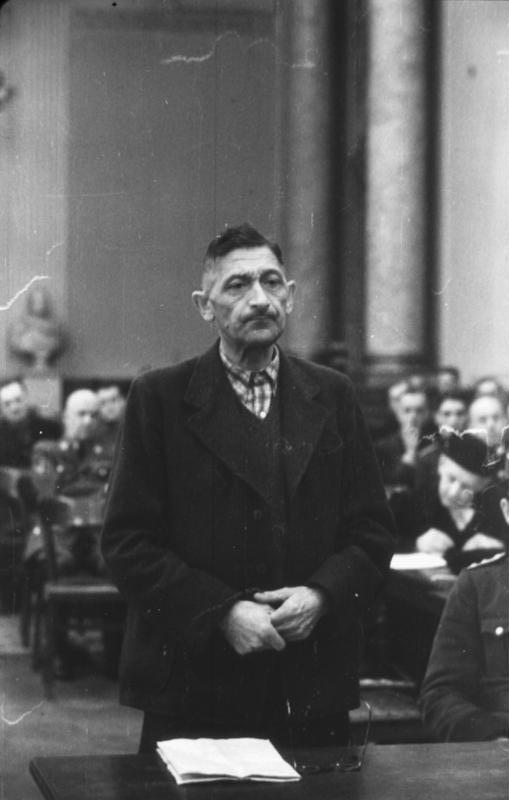
- Ferdinand Freiherr von Lüninck on trial before the People's Court, 1944

Oberpräsident, Province of Westphalia
- In office 22 February 1933 – 21 July 1938

Personal details
- Born: 3 August 1888 Ostwig, Province of Westphalia, Kingdom of Prussia, German Empire
- Died: 14 November 1944 (aged 56) Plötzensee Prison, Berlin, Nazi Germany
- Cause of death: Execution by hanging
- Party: Nazi Party (NSDAP)
- Other political affiliations: German National People's Party
- Education: University of Münster, University of Göttingen, Ludwig-Maximilians-Universität München
- Profession: Lawyer; Civil servant

Military service
- Allegiance: German Empire; Nazi Germany
- Branch/service: Imperial German Army; German Army
- Years of service: 1914–1918; 1939–1943
- Rank: Leutnant; Major
- Unit: Guards Rifles Battalion
- Commands: 178th Infantry Reserve Battalion; 9th Infantry Reserve Battalion
- Battles/wars: World War I World War II
- Awards: Iron Cross 1st and 2nd class

Ferdinand Joseph Meinolph Anton Maria Freiherr von Lüninck (3 August 1888 – 14 November 1944) was a German landowner, lawyer, military officer and politician. An early supporter of the Nazi Party, he became the Oberpräsident of the Province of Westphalia. He eventually joined the opponents of the regime and was executed in connection with the failed 20 July Plot.

== Family ==
Scion of a noble family, Ferdinand Freiherr von Lüninck was born at the family estate Haus Ostwig, in Ostwig, Province of Westphalia, and was married to Auguste Freiin von Gaugreben-Schönau, with whom he had two daughters and three sons. His younger brother Hermann von Lüninck later became Oberpräsident of the Rhine Province.

== Early years ==
Lüninck studied law at the University of Münster, the University of Göttingen, and the Ludwig-Maximilians-Universität München, passing his initial state examination in 1909. He served in the Imperial German Army during the First World War as a Leutnant and company commander in a Guards Rifles Battalion, earning the Iron Cross 1st and 2nd class. After the war, he adopted a career in government and was until 1922 District Administrator (Landrat) in Neuss. A conservative and a monarchist, he was fiercely opposed to democracy and the Weimar Republic. After his father's death, he resigned from the civil service and moved back to his family home to administer the estate. He became active in the Westphalia Landwirtschaftskammer, a body representing and regulating matters relating to rural interests and forests. From 1924 to 1928 he headed the Westphalia branch of Der Stahlhelm, a militant and conservative veterans association. A member of the conservative German National People's Party (Deutschnationale Volkspartei; DNVP) he supported the course that the Nazis were taking.

== Career in Nazi Germany ==
Following the Nazi seizure of power, Lüninck was appointed as Oberpräsident (Senior President) of the Province of Westphalia on 22 February 1933. During his time in office, he participated in the persecution and disenfranchisement of ethnic groups, and many anti-Jewish riots were held. On 12 October 1933, he was appointed by Prussian Minister President Hermann Göring to the newly reconstituted Prussian State Council. In 1934, he also became a member of the Provincial Council of Westphalia.

Lüninck was never fully trusted by the Nazi hierarchy due to his ardent Catholicism and conservative, monarchist background; he was not one of the Alter Kampfer. On 21 July 1938, he was suspended as Oberpräsident on Göring's initiative, and was soon replaced by the Nazi Party Gauleiter of Gau Westphalia-North, Alfred Meyer. Lüninck returned to military service on the formation of a reserve battalion at Soest in 1939 after the outbreak of the Second World War. In 1940, he was made a Major of reserves in the 9th Infantry Regiment in Potsdam and was given command of the 178th and 9th infantry reserve battalions, which he led until early 1943.

== Involvement in the 20 July plot and death ==
Lüninck then became involved in the plans to overthrow Adolf Hitler after having met the plotters Carl Friedrich Goerdeler and Fritz-Dietlof von der Schulenburg in Berlin at the end of 1943. He declared himself willing to take on a political assignment, and they were considering him for leadership of Wehrkreis (Military District) XX in Danzig, (today Gdańsk, Poland). After the plot failed, his participation was uncovered by the Gestapo and he was arrested on 25 July 1944. He was tried and sentenced to death by the Volksgerichtshof (People's Court) on 13 November 1944, and was hanged at Plötzensee Prison in Berlin the next day.

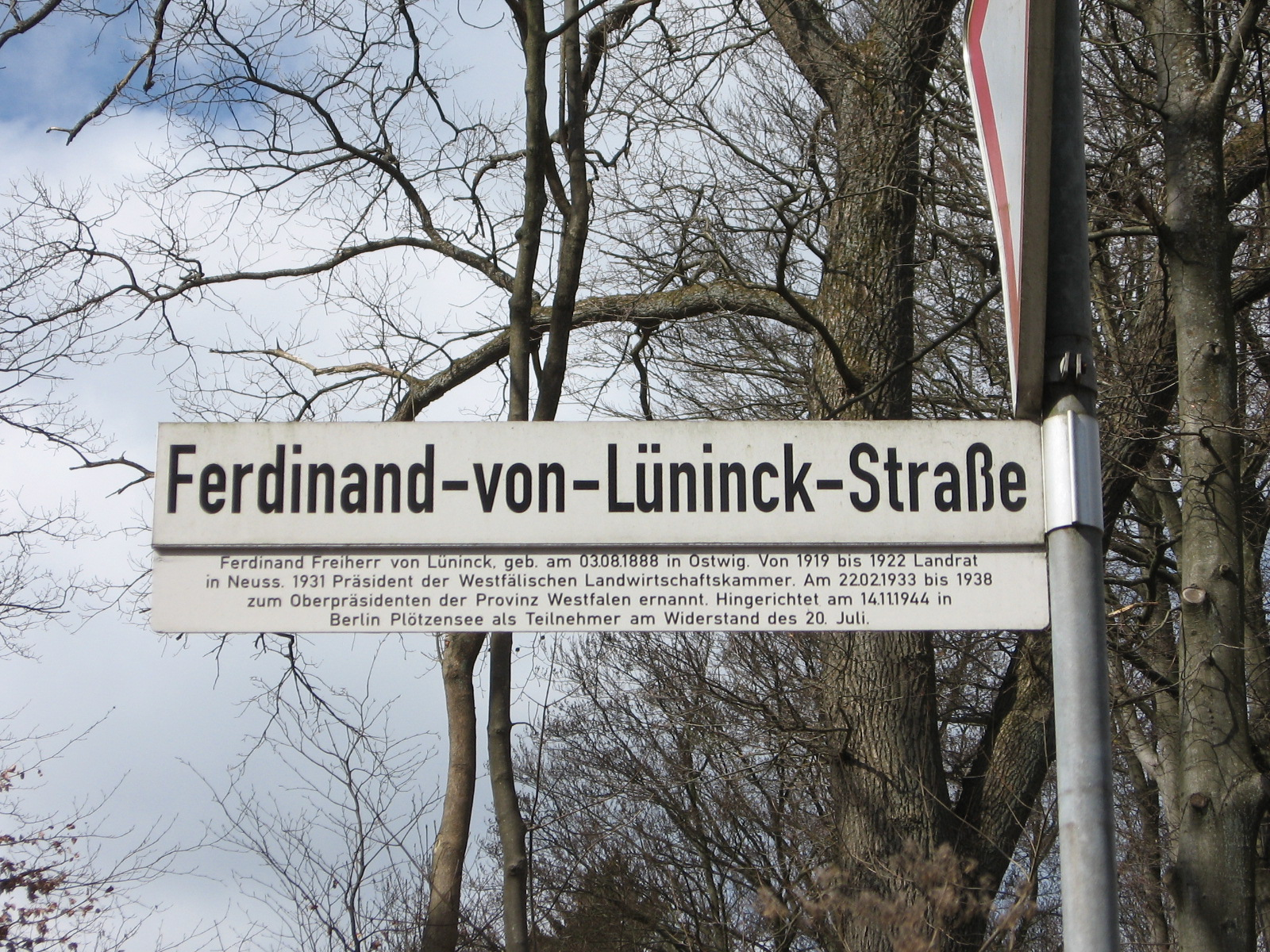
Street in Ostwig named in honor of Lüninck
