= Bestwig =

- Municipality
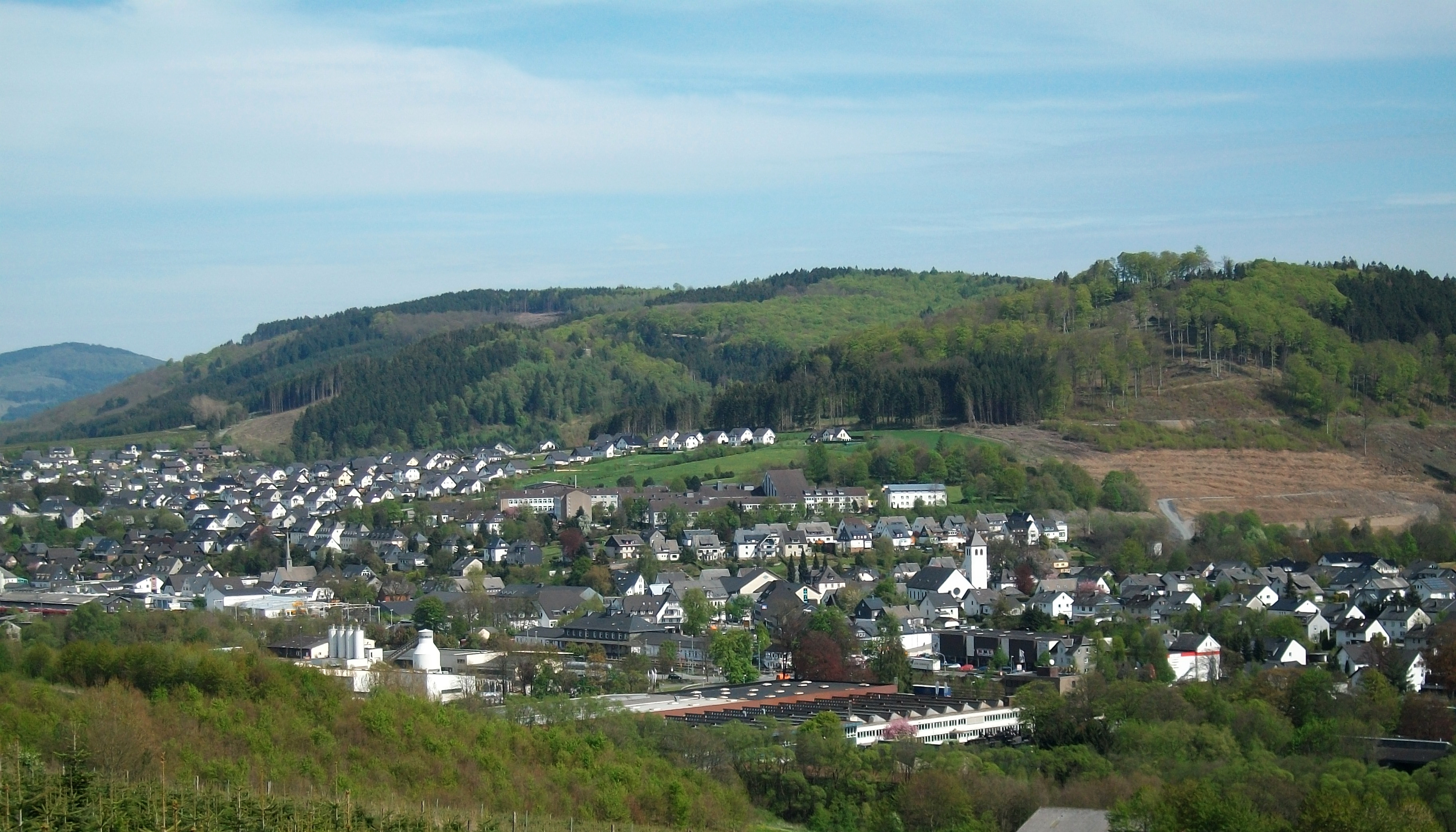
- General view of Bestwig

- Coat of arms

- Location of Bestwig within Hochsauerlandkreis district
- Interactive map of Bestwig
- Location within Germany Location within North Rhine-Westphalia
- Coordinates: 51°22′N 08°24′E
- Country: Germany
- State: North Rhine-Westphalia
- Admin. region: Arnsberg
- District: Hochsauerlandkreis
- Subdivisions: 6, containing 17 Ortsteile (villages)

Government
  - Mayor (2025–30): Christoph Rosenau (CDU)

Area
  - Total: 69.36 km^{2} (26.78 sq mi)
- Elevation: 280–750 m (920–2,460 ft)

Population (2025-12-31)
  - Total: 9,976
  - Density: 143.8/km^{2} (372.5/sq mi)
- Time zone: UTC+01:00 (CET)
  - Summer (DST): UTC+02:00 (CEST)
- Postal codes: 59909
- Dialling codes: 02904, 02905
- Vehicle registration: HSK
- Website: www.bestwig.de

Bestwig is a municipality in the Hochsauerland district, in North Rhine-Westphalia, Germany.

== Geography ==
Bestwig is situated on the river Ruhr, approx. 10 km east of Meschede. It lies on the German Autobahn A 46. Bestwig has a railway station, connecting the town through local trains to Dortmund Hauptbahnhof, Winterberg and Hagen Hauptbahnhof.

=== Neighbouring municipalities ===
- Olsberg
- Schmallenberg
- Meschede
- Rüthen
- Warstein

=== Subdivisions ===
Since 2009, the municipality is officially divided into six Ortschaften, each containing one to five villages (Ortsteile).

Ortschaft	Ortsteile	Population
Velmede	Velmede, Bestwig, Föckinghausen, Nierbachtal, Halbeswig	4.595 (3.140, 1.391, 29, 28, 7)
Nuttlar	Nuttlar, Grimlinghausen	1.586 (1.556, 30)
Ostwig	Ostwig, Alfert, Borghausen	1.691 (973, 58, 660)
Heringhausen	Heringhausen	793
Ramsbeck	Ramsbeck, Berlar, Valme	1.827 (1.608, 146, 73)
Andreasberg	Andreasberg, Dörnberg, Wasserfall	609 (482, 76, 51)

== Population ==
Historical population

Year	Pop.	±% p.a.
1965	11,966	—
1970	12,121	+0.26%
1975	11,902	−0.36%
1980	11,885	−0.03%
1985	11,366	−0.89%
1990	11,571	+0.36%
1995	12,148	+0.98%

Year	Pop.	±% p.a.
2000	12,013	−0.22%
2005	11,812	−0.34%
2010	11,285	−0.91%
2015	11,170	−0.20%
2020	10,525	−1.18%
2025	9,976	−1.07%

Source: Landesdatabank Nordrhein-Westfalen

== Politics ==
The current mayor of Bestwig is Christoph Rosenau of the CDU, who has been serving as mayor since 2025. In the 2025 local elections he was elected with 68,25 % of the vote.

=== City council ===
After the 2025 local elections, the Bestwig city council is composed as follows:

Party	Votes	%	+/-	Seats	+/-
Christian Democratic Union (CDU)	2,916	61.3	▲4.2	17	▲1
Social Democratic Party (SPD)	1,642	34.5	▼3.0	10	±0
Alliance 90/The Greens (Grüne)	200	4.2	▼1.2	1	▼1
Valid votes	4,758	97.2			
Invalid votes	136	2.8			
Total	4,894	100.0		28	±0
Electorate/voter turnout	8,134	60.2			
Source: City of Bestwig

== Economy ==
Bestwig, surrounded by many acres of pine tree forests, is a centre of Christmas tree production.

Tourism, however, is the most important source of income. The Sauerland forests are popular among hikers and, in winter, skiing is possible.

== Twin towns ==
Bestwig has no official partnership with another town, but has close to ties to Niederorschel (Thuringia, Germany) and Niederwiesa (Saxony, Germany).

== Coat of arms ==
The coat of arms shows a silver Saint Andrew's Cross on blue ground. The Saint Andrew's Cross is a reference to the patron of the parish church in Velmede, Saint Andrew. The colors silver and blue show the allegiance to the former county of Arnsberg.

== Notable natives ==
- Franz Hoffmeister (1898-1943), Roman Catholic priest
- Theo Bücker (born 1948), coach of Lebanon's national football team
- Wilhelmine Lübke (1885–1981), First Lady
- Ferdinand von Lüninck (born 1888), German nobleman (a Freiherr i.e. a Baron) Roman Catholic, who participated in plans to overthrow Hitler on 20 July 1944. Arrested after plot failed and sentenced to death. Hanged on 14 November 1944.
- Hedwig von Beverfoerde (born 1963), German noblewoman, right-wing political activist and Traditional Catholic

== Notable places in Bestwig ==
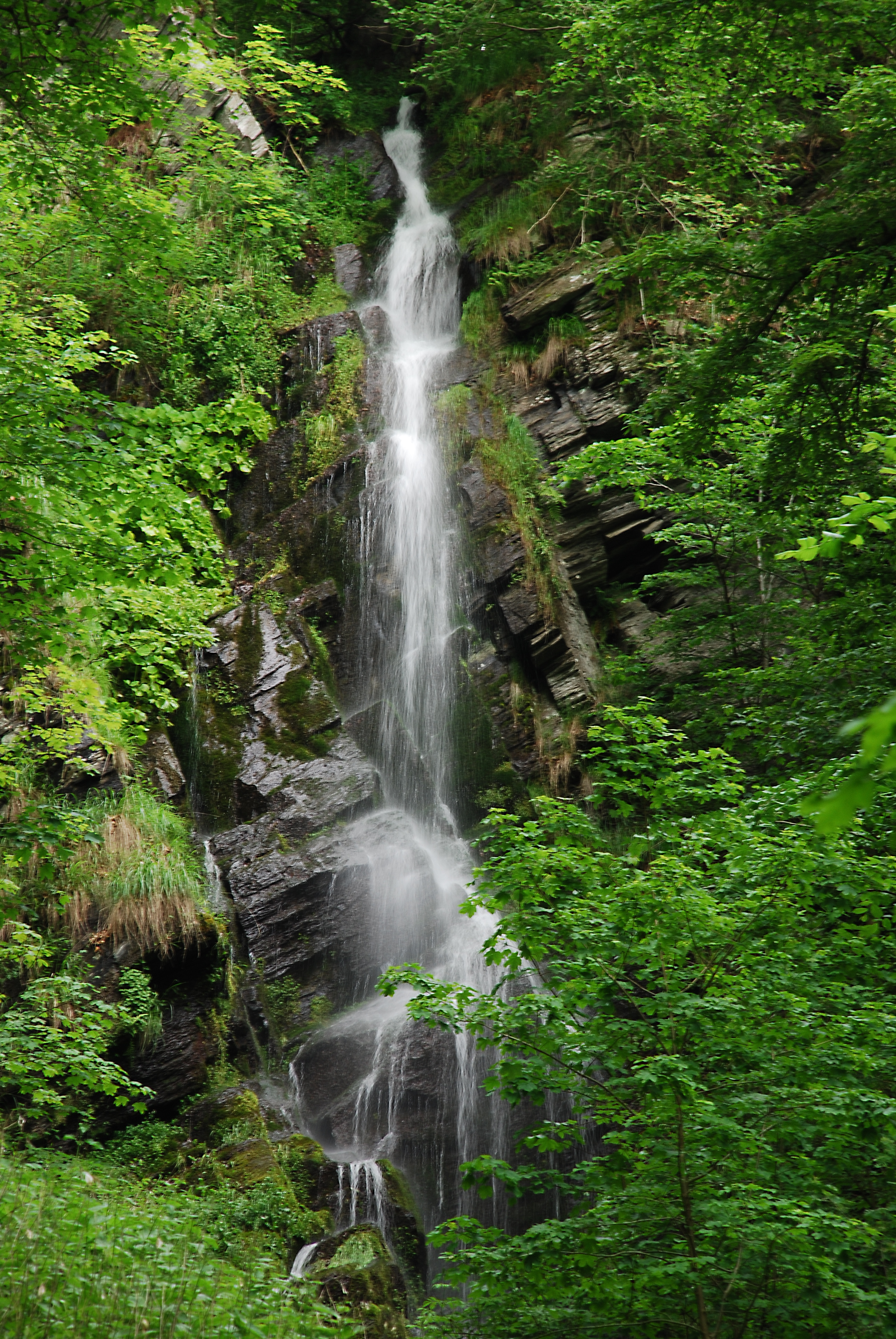
Waterfall Plästerlegge near Wasserfall
- Wasserfall is named after its famous waterfall, a popular sight during walking tours. It is one of the largest cascades in North Rhine-Westphalia.
- Bergkloster Monastery, the motherhouse of the European Province of the Sisters of St Maria Magdalena Postel
