= Azelin chandelier =

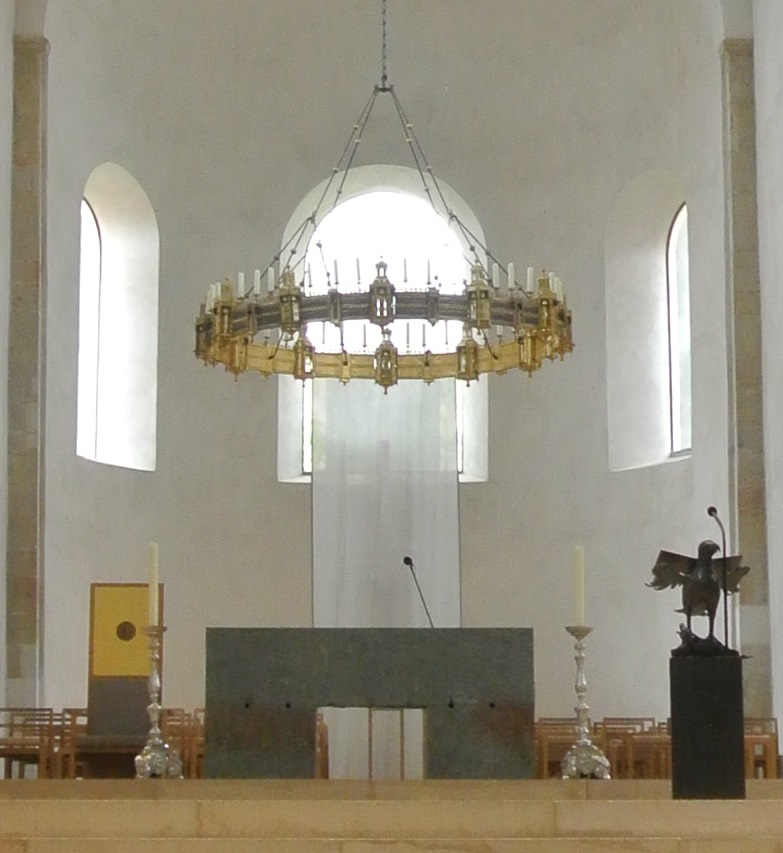
- The chandelier in the Hildesheim Cathedral above the altar, 2015
- Year: Eleventh century
- Type: Romanesque art
- Medium: Gilt copper
- Location: Hildesheim, Germany; 52.1489°N 9.9464°E

The Azelin chandelier 1018 A.D (German: Azelinleuchter) is a Romanesque wheel chandelier, made in the 11th century for the Hildesheim Cathedral in Hildesheim, Germany, a UNESCO World Cultural Heritage site since 1985. It is the oldest of four extant wheel chandeliers from that period, along with the Hezilo chandelier, also in Hildesheim, the Barbarossa chandelier in the Aachen Cathedral, and the Hartwig chandelier in the Abbey of Comburg. It was believed to be donated by Bishop Azelin, however his predecessor Thietmar is more likely to be the patron. Therefore, the chandelier is also called the Thietmar chandelier (Thietmarleuchter).

== Description ==
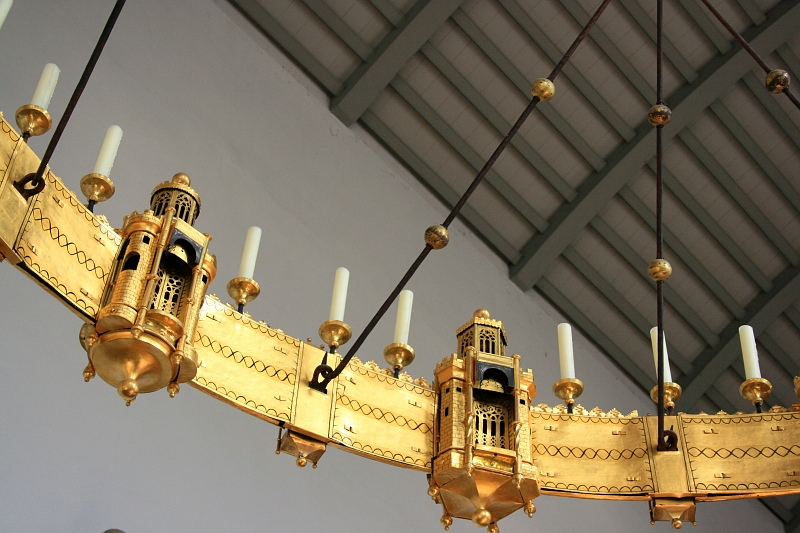
Detail

A wheel chandelier is also called a corona (crown) and circular chandelier. Like the later and larger Hezilo chandelier, the Azelin chandelier is a circular hoop of gilt copper and tinplate, decorated with twelve towers and twelve gatehouses. However, the decoration is much sparser, limited to a braided bar in the middle of the hoop and an openwork wreath of foliage on the upper edge of the hoop. The twelve gatehouses, to which the ropes holding the chandelier up are attached, are basically rectangular in shape with rounded arches and roofing. It is possible that they once held figures, but these would have had to have been very small and flat. The twelve towers are more elaborate, with a hexagonal groundplan. On the outside there are three niches closed with openwork doors, on the inside there is one niche flanked by two (alternately round or square) towers decorated with battlements and imitation brickwork. The spires of the towers extend above the top of the chandelier's hoop and are alternately round or hexagonal, with openwork windows in imitation of roof lanterns.

The Azelin chandelier has been repeatedly altered by additions, removals, and repairs over the centuries. The overall image of the New Jerusalem, lit up and floating in the air, which all works of this type present, has been maintained. An important and meticulous restoration of the chandelier was carried out between 1982 and 1989, repairing the damage World War II.

== History ==
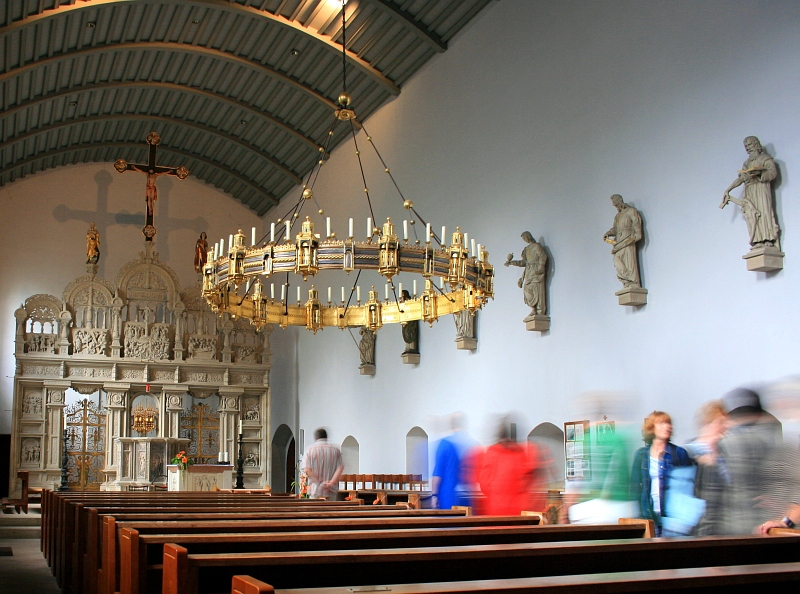
The chandelier in the church of St. Antonius, 2008

The Azelin chandelier, named for its supposed donor, the bishop Azelin (1044–1054) is the predecessor of the Hezilo chandelier, which was probably commissioned by Azelin's successor Hezilo. Perhaps the two wheel chandeliers were originally planned as a set, just as they then hung in the cathedral for centuries: the Hezilo chandelier in the nave, the Azelin chandelier (which is about half the size) in the choir. The chandeliers were created after the devastating fire of 1046, in which the cathedral of Altfrid and many nearby buildings in the Domhof were destroyed. Before this, a gold and silver wheel chandelier, gifted by Bernward of Hildesheim had hung in the nave. This earlier chandelier was definitely destroyed in the fire. The chandelier was thought to have been commissioned by Bishop Azelin after this fire, but according to a lost document from the 16th century his predecessor Thietmar of Hildesheim was the patron. It is not clear, in that case, how the chandelier survived the fire of 1046.

From 1960, when the cathedral and the adjacent buildings were rebuilt, the chandelier hung in the church of St. Antonius, adjacent to the cloisters of the cathedral. After the completion of extensive restorations of the cathedral, reopened on 15 August 2014, and the conversion of St. Antonius to a part of the Cathedral museum, the Azelin chandelier was returned to the cathedral and placed again above the altar in the crossing, while the Hezilo chandelier, which hung there before, was returned to its original location in the nave.

== Literature ==
- Bernhard Gallistl: Bedeutung und Gebrauch der großen Lichterkrone im Hildesheimer Dom. In: Concilium medii aevi 12, 2009, S. 43–88, online: (German) (PDF; 2,9 MB). Retrieved 18 January 2012
- Adolf Bertram, Geschichte des Bisthums Hildesheim, (German) vol. 1, Hildesheim 1899, p. 106.
- Christine Wulf: Die Inschriften der Stadt Hildesheim. (German) Wiesbaden 2003 (Die deutschen Inschriften 58). vol. 2. pp. 213–216.
