= Azelin =

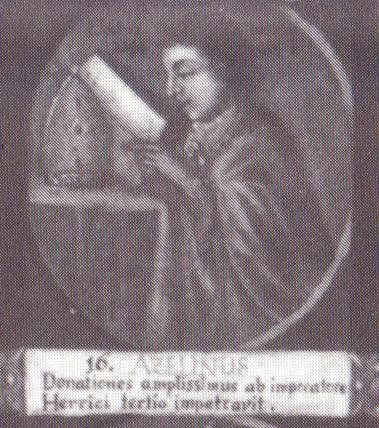
- Azelin as 16th Bishop of Hildesheim, part of a painting, c. 1800
- Born: before 1000
- Died: 8 March 1054; Hildesheim
- Occupation: Bishop of Hildesheim

Azelin (before 1000 – 8 March 1054) was Bishop of Hildesheim from 1044 until 1054.

Azelin's origin is not known. He was appointed Bishop of Hildesheim by Emperor Henry III, succeeding Thietmar. During his tenure, the cathedral built by Altfrid was destroyed by a fire on 23 March 1046, along with works of art and documents. Azelin's plans to build a new cathedral were not successful. The wheel chandelier known by his name as the Azelin chandelier was possibly donated by Thietmar.

He died in Hildesheim and was succeeded by Hezilo.

== Literature ==
- Adolf Bertram: Geschichte des Bisthums Hildesheim. Lax, Hildesheim u. a. 1899–1925, vol. 1, pp. 100–107.
