= Hezilo chandelier =

11th-century Romanesque wheel chandelier

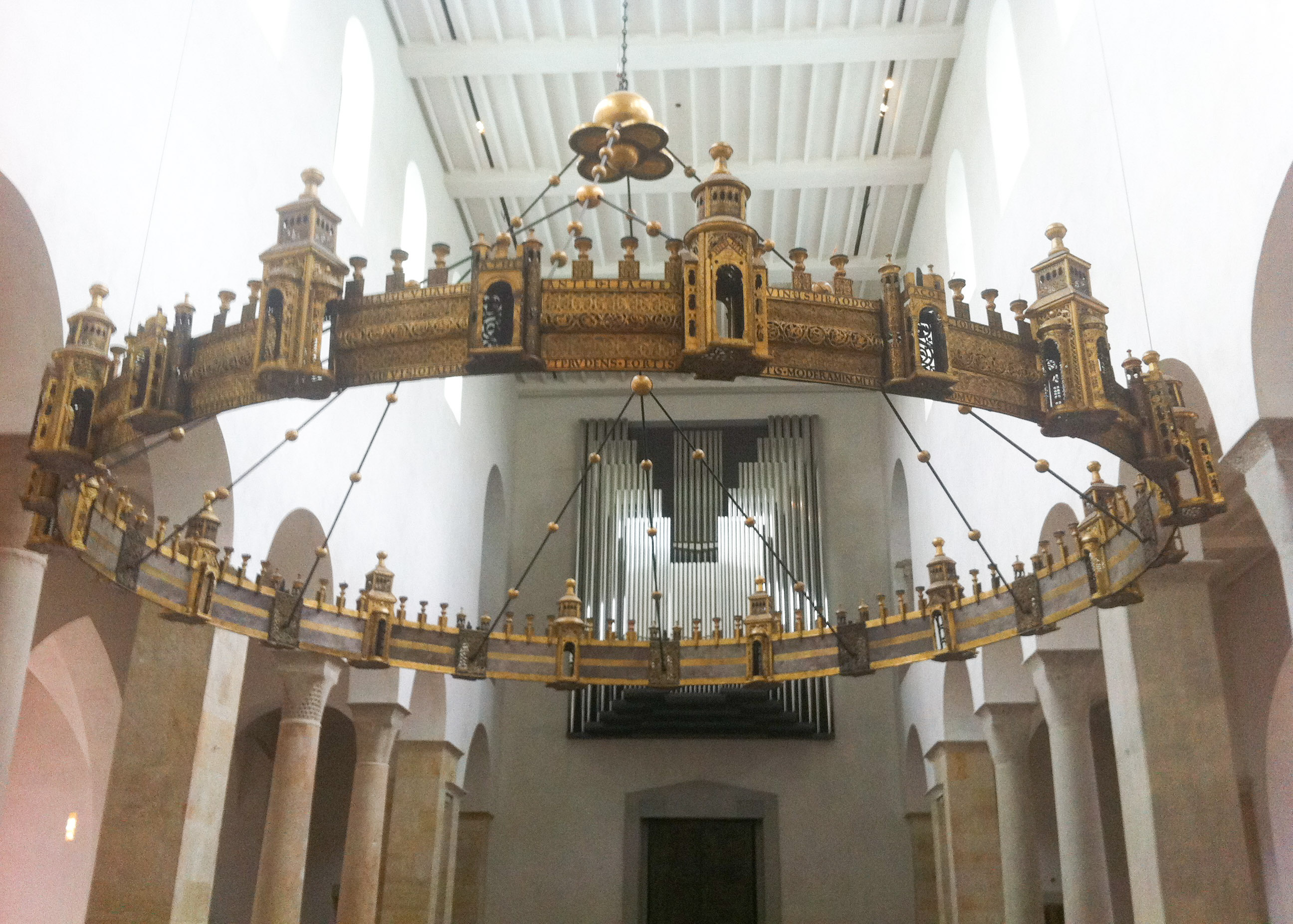
- The Heziloleuchter above the Hildesheim Cathedral nave, in 2014
- Year: Eleventh century
- Type: Romanesque art
- Medium: Gilt copper
- Dimensions: 600 cm (240 in)
- Location: Hildesheim, Germany; 52.1489°N 9.9464°E

The Hezilo chandelier (German: Heziloleuchter) is an 11th-century Romanesque wheel chandelier. It is part of the treasures of the Hildesheim Cathedral in Hildesheim, Germany, which has been a UNESCO World Cultural Heritage site since 1985. The chandelier was most likely commissioned by Bishop Hezilo of Hildesheim, who rebuilt the cathedral after a fire. He probably also influenced the program of imagery and inscriptions. It is the largest of four extant wheel chandeliers of the period; the others surviving examples are the Azelin chandelier (also in Hildesheim), the Barbarossa chandelier in the Aachen Cathedral, and the Hartwig chandelier in the Abbey of Comburg.

During the restoration of the cathedral (from 2010 to 2014), the chandelier was installed in St. Godehard, a basilica since 1963 and the temporary bishop's seat. After the restoration of the cathedral, which reopened on 15 August 2014, it was returned to its original location in the cathedral's nave.

== Description ==
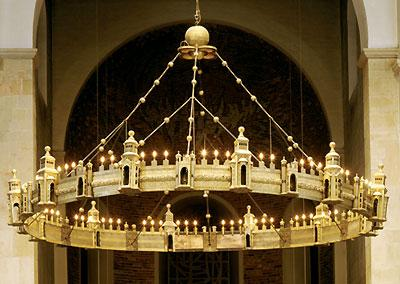
The chandelier in the cathedral, c. 2003

The Hezilo chandelier is composed of a circular hoop which is 6 metres (20 ft) in diameter. The hoop is made of gilt copper and bears Latin inscriptions on the upper and lower edges. Between the inscriptions are three horizontal bands, with the middle band bulging outwards, which are richly decorated with openwork foliage. There are square merlons on top of the hoop holding seventy-two candles.

Twelve towers and twelve gate-houses alternate along the outside of the hoop. The layout of the towers is a Greek cross with four apses (alternately rounded with domed roofs and square with pitched roofs) and a doorway. The upper parts of the towers have a narrower form, extending above the candles on the hoop and topped with large balls. Small statues or lamps probably originally stood inside these towers.

The gatehouses are flat, no higher than the hoop and are closed at the rear - where the ropes which hold up the chandelier are anchored. Each gate is flanked by two small but richly decorated round turrets and is crowned with battlements and the name of an apostle. It is likely that there were once images of these apostles in the doorways.

In the center, a large lamp is hung from a rope. The chandelier, also called a corona (crown) or circular chandelier, hung in the nave until 1944, when it was removed to protect it from bombing. It hung above the altar in the crossing from the reopening of the cathedral in 1960 to 2010, when cathedral restoration work began.

== History ==
Bernward, Bishop of Hildesheim, gifted the first large wheel chandelier to the Hildesheim Cathedral built by Bishop Altfrid, and later also gave one to the adjacent church of St. Michael. After Altfrid's cathedral burned down in 1046, Bishop Hezilo had it rebuilt with alterations, rejecting the plan of his predecessor Azelin to build a new cathedral, and in the nave he hung a "crown chandelier of shimmering gold", which is now known by his name as the Hezilo chandelier. It is not clear what influence the earlier chandelier of Bernward had on the design of this replacement.

== Symbolism ==
The model for a chandelier as the symbol of the New Jerusalem was the great wheel chandelier in the Church of the Holy Sepulchre above Golgotha; the Azelin chandelier was designed to have the same symbolism. Elements of Islamic art in the ornamentation of the chandelier support the identification with Jerusalem.

The idea of the chandelier is the image of a floating city: according to the inscription, the Heavenly Jerusalem as target of the old and new covenants, fragrant with the scent of virtue, populated by the saints, lit by God himself, the source of all light.

— Bertram, p. 117

The Hezilo chandelier was at the liturgical center of the cathedral until the nineteenth century, with services held under its crown of light. Its location marked the beginning and end of the great processions of the cathedral chapter on Sundays and holidays. The chandelier served as a symbol of righteousness. Violations of the sovereignty of the diocese were solemnly resolved beneath it.

== Restoration ==
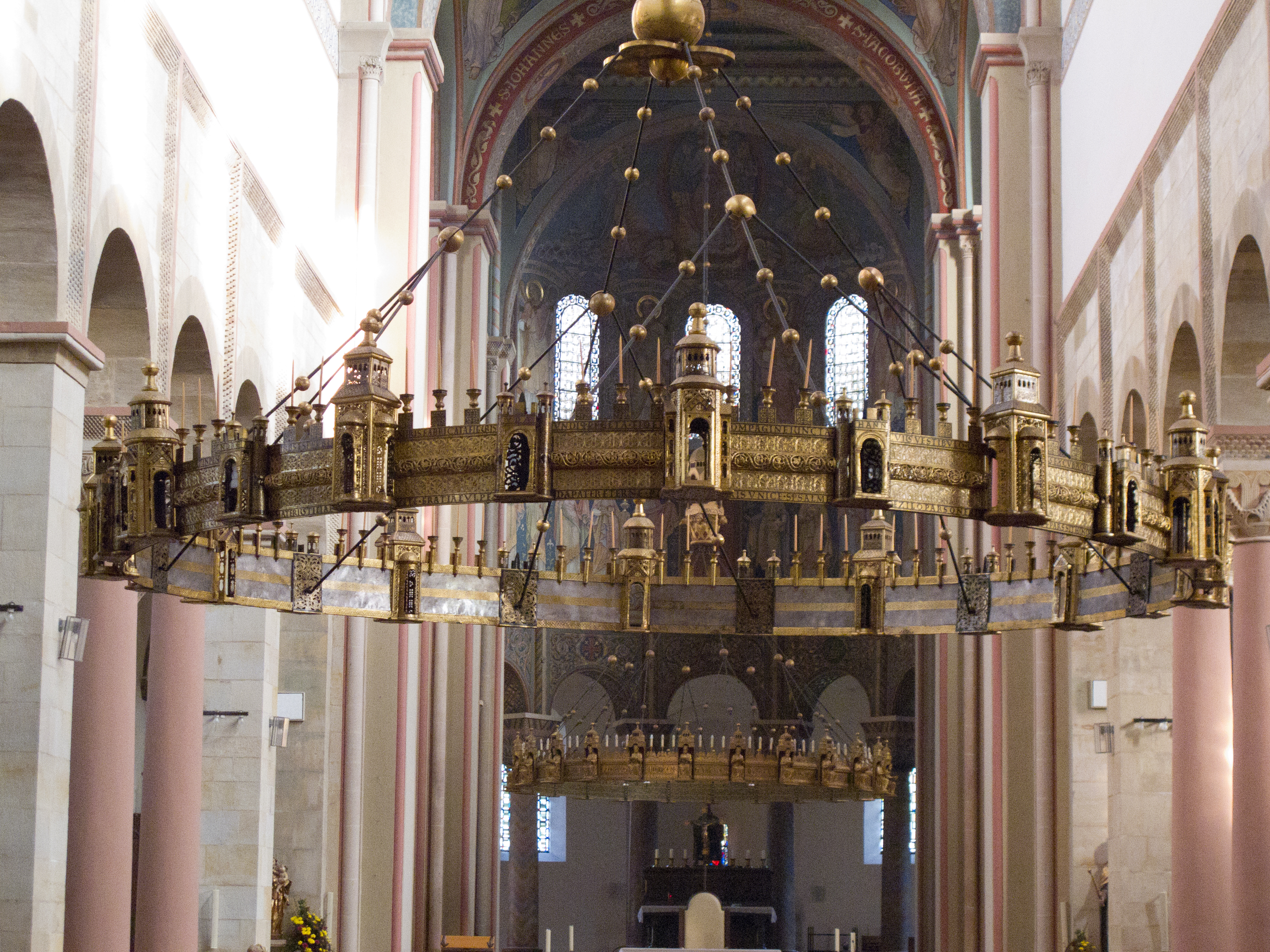
In St. Godehard, 2011

Restoration work was carried out in the 16th century and again at the beginning of the 19th and 20th centuries, During the Second World War, the Hezilo chandelier was dismantled and removed from the cathedral — which was virtually destroyed by Allied bombing in March 1945. After the cathedral was rebuilt during the 1950s, the 900-year-old chandelier was placed in the crossing. It underwent extensive conservation work from 2002 until 2007. In 2010, when restoration work on the cathedral began, it was moved to St. Godehard, a Romanesque church in Hildesheim and the temporary seat of the bishop.

== Inscription ==
Due to early modern restorations, the verse inscription has been significantly altered. The donor's name, "Hezilo" was written in a later script. The oldest version is in a manuscript from around 1500:

Latin
English

URBS EST SUBLIMIS MIRIS FABRICATA FIGURIS
VNDIQVE PERFECTA FIDEI COMPAGINE IVNCTA
GERMINE VIRTVTVM QVAE MIRE SVRGIT IN ALTVM
AVCTORES OPERIS TOGA VESTIT CANDIDA PACIS
IN VIRTVTE SVA SOLIS SOL LVCET IN ILLA
ET SOLIVM REGNI CORDIS LOCAT IN PENETRALI
CVIVS VESTIBVLO VETVS ET NOVVS EXCVBAT ORDO
MISTICA DISCERNIT TENET ASPICIT OMNIA NOVIT
FLORIBVS HIC VIVIS ANIMARUM CVRIA LVCIS
ANTE DEI FACIEM DIVINUM SPIRAT ODOREM
HOS PATER ET VERBVM CIVES ET SPIRITVS HORVM
VNVS ET IPSE REGIT QVI QVOD SVNT IPSE CREAVIT

The city on high is built with amazing shapes,
perfected throughout by the bond of faith,
joined by the bud of the virtues which he miraculously makes flourish.
He clothes the authors of this work in the white gown of peace.
The Sun of the Sun glows in its virtue.
There also is the seat of the royal heart in the innermost place,
where his soldiers old and new stand guard at the gate.
He knows, holds, sees the mysteries. He renews all things.
A bouquet of souls have been enlivened there -
a court of light breathes incense before the divine face of God.
The Father, the Word, and the Spirit rule these people,
three in one, he who created all that is.

MATER IVSTITIAE VIA VITAE GRATIA CVLPE
ISTIVS ORNATVS PIA VIRGO SUSCIPE MVNVS
ETQUE DO (et quod?) PARS ONERIS PER TE QVOQVE PARS SIT HONORIS
DA PATER ETERNE PATRIS VNICE SPIRITVS ALME
VT PRVDENS FORTIS IVSTVS MODERAMINE MITIS
HIC SERAT ATQVE METAT QVOD LUCIS IN HORREA CEDAT
ET SPES ATQVE FIDES ET AMORIS VT ACTIO PERPES
HVNC REGAT AD SPECIEM DAT PACIS VISIO PACEM
CONSVMENS IGNIS CONSVMAT ET OMNIA CARNIS
NE CAREAT PATRIA VIA LABILIS VRGEAT ISTA
SED MVNDVS CORDE SANCTVS ET IVSTVS IN ORE
SIT ODOR SPONSO SVPER OMNIA BALSAMA CHRISTO

Mother, path of Justice, in thanks for life,
pious virgin, accept the work of this decoration
and I grant (also that?) your part of the toil may be the part of honour too.
Eternal Father of fathers, sole nourishment of the soul, grant
that if one who is aware of chance, just, and mild at the rudder
sows their seed here, they will reap a harvest like those found in heaven's granary.
May hope and faith and love's perpetual performance (as it were)
rule him in like manner. Let the vision of peace grant peace.
Let devouring fire devour everything of the flesh
so that he will not avoid the path of his father.
If he slips, may he be driven that way,
but may the Holy World be in his heart and just
fragrance in his mouth, his vow to Christ exceeding all perfumes.

== Bibliography ==
- Willmuth Arenhövel. Der Hezilo-Radleuchter im Dom zu Hildesheim: Beiträge zur Hildesheimer Kunst des 11. Jahrhunderts unter besonderer Berücksichtigung der Ornamentik. Mann, Berlin 1975, ISBN 3-7861-4099-5.
- Norbert Bergmann. "Der Hezilo-Leuchter – Eine Systemanalyse und ihre Folgen," in Ursula Schädler-Saub (ed.), Weltkulturerbe Deutschland. Präventative Konservierung und Erhaltungsperspektiven, internationale Fachtagung des Deutschen Nationalkomitees von ICOMOS. Hildesheim, 23.–25. November 2006. Regensburg 2008
- Adolf Bertram. Geschichte des Bisthums Hildesheim, Vol. I, Hildesheim 1899, pp. 116f & 120f.
- Bernhard Gallistl. "Bedeutung und Gebrauch der großen Lichterkrone im Hildesheimer Dom" in Concilium medii aevi 12, 2009, pp. 43–88, online: (PDF; 2,9 MB). Retrieved 18 January 2012
- Ulrich Knapp, Karl Bernhard Kruse. Der Hezilo-Leuchter im Hildesheimer Dom. Schnell und Steiner, Regensburg 2013, ISBN 978-3-7954-2755-9
- Ch. Wulf (ed.). Die Inschriften der Stadt Hildesheim. Ges. und bearb. von Ch. Wulf. Wiesbaden 2003, (Die deutschen Inschriften 58). vol 2. pp. 213–216
