= Barbarossa Chandelier =

Coordinates: 50.7747°N 6.0839°E

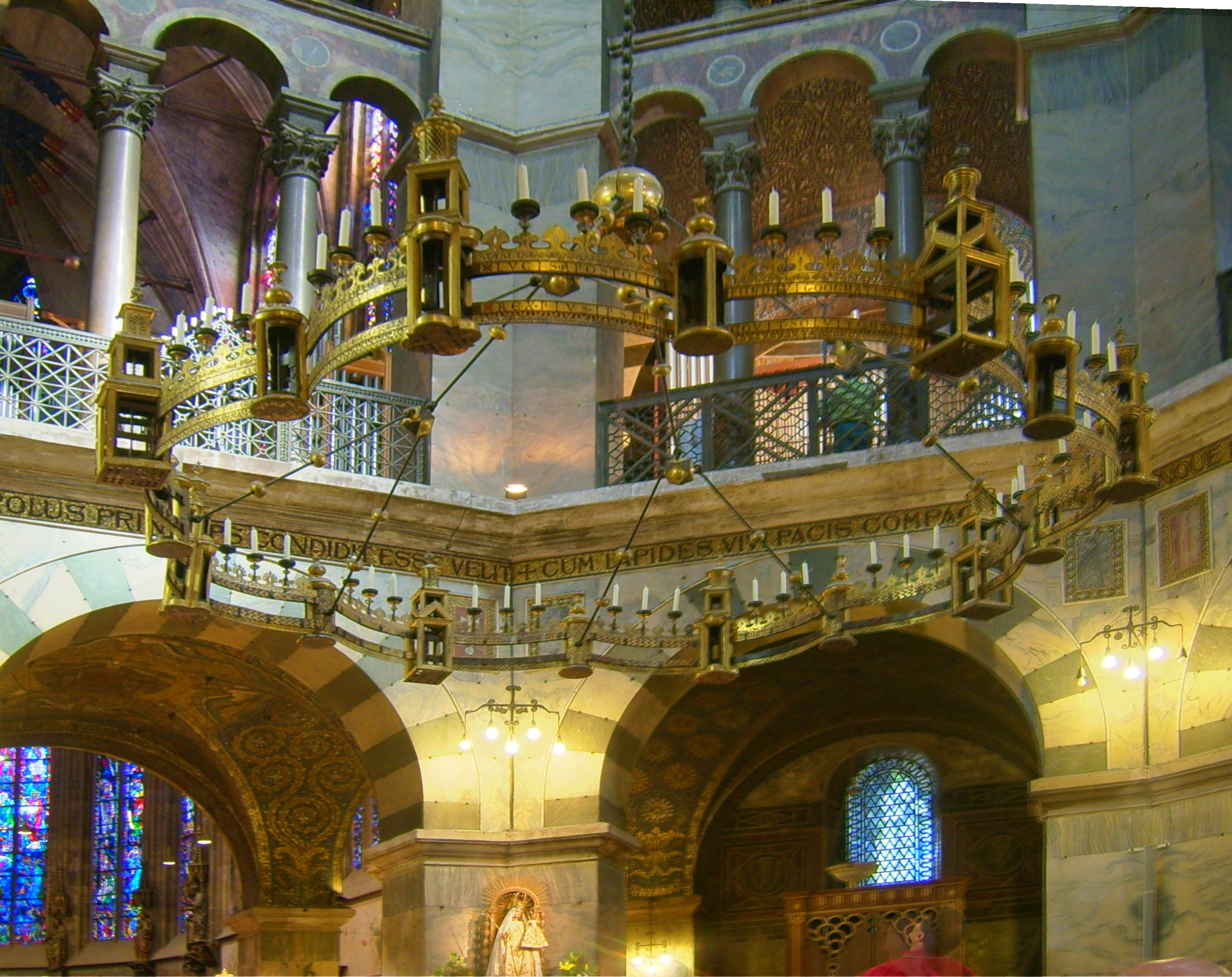
The Barbarossa Chandelier donated to Aachen Cathedral by Emperor Frederick I in the twelfth century

The Barbarossa Chandelier (German: Barbarossaleuchter) was made on the order of Emperor Frederick I, nicknamed Barbarossa, and his wife Beatrice sometime between 1165 and 1170 and was installed under the cupola of the Palatine Chapel in Aachen Cathedral. The chandelier was a donation in honour of Mary, Mother of God, the patroness of Aachen Cathedral and simultaneously represented a tribute to the builder of the cathedral, Charlemagne.

== Form ==
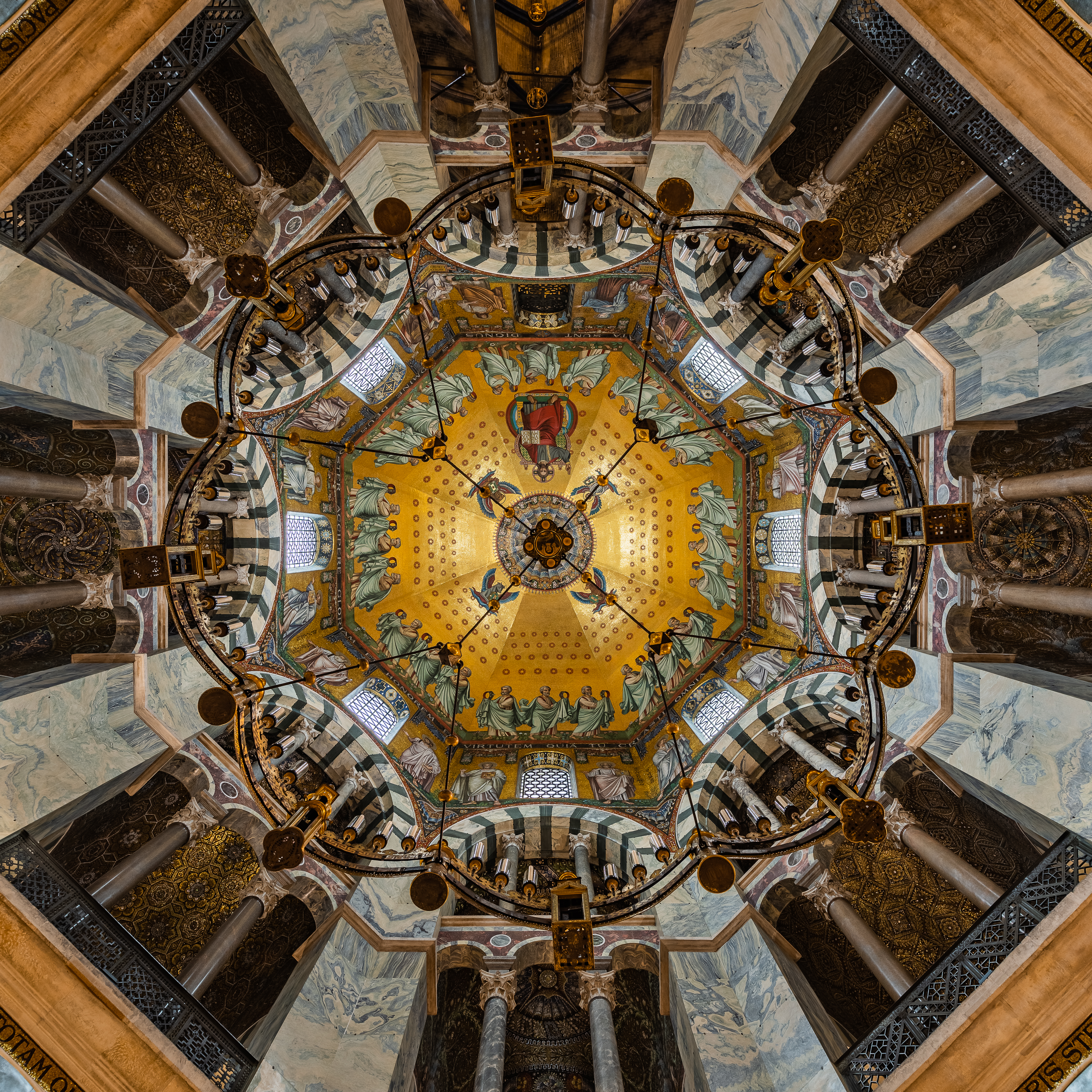
The four meter wide wheel chandelier hanging from the octagonal cupola, about four metres above the ground

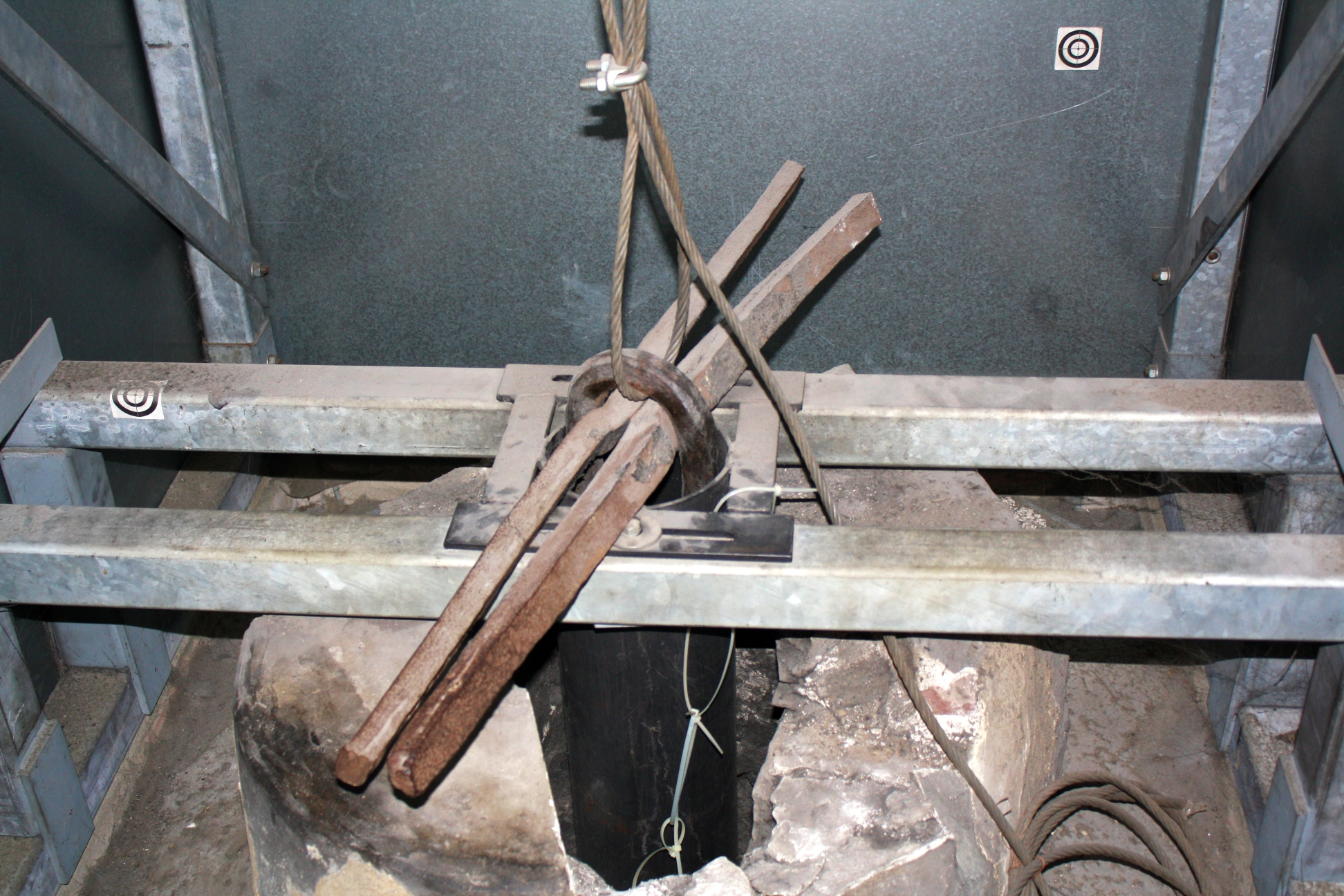
Suspension mechanism of the chandelier above the Octagon

The Barbarossa Chandelier was made of gilt copper in the form of a wheel chandelier. It has a diameter of 4.20 metres and is mounted on a roughly 27 metre long chain under the middle of the roof of the Palatine chapel - the Carolingian Octagon of the Cathedral. Reports that the original chain from Carolingian times is incorporated into the current chain are not true, since the links of the chain taper downwards. The chain links are tapered toward the bottom from a length of 150mm to 130mm and of a width of 74mm to 70mm. As a result, the impression when viewed from below is that the entire length of the chain has the same thickness. The chandelier, floating about four metres above the marble floor, is composed of eight curved segments, thereby conforming to the octagonal shape of the Palatine chapel. The circle of the wheel chandelier symbolises the city wall of the New Jerusalem. The stylised city wall of the chandelier contains eight large and eight small gate towers, which are arranged symmetrically. Because of the octagonal structure of the surrounding building, the traditional depiction of the Heavenly Jerusalem with only twelve towers was precluded.

In total, the chandelier contains 48 candles, which are lit on solemn occasions even today.

Silver figures, depicting the saints, angels, and sentries, originally mounted on the 16 towers, have been lost. The base panels of the towers have been preserved and can be seen from below, on which scenes from the Life of Jesus are engraved, particularly the eight beatitudes from the Sermon on the Mount.

A Latin inscription on the chandelier reads in translation:

Frederick, Catholic Emperor of the Holy Roman Empire, promised to take care that number and shape complement and harmonise with the dimensions of this lofty temple: this crown of light, a princely gift.

The Barbarossa Chandelier is one of only four surviving romanesque wheel chandeliers in Germany; the others are the Azelin and Hezilo chandeliers at Hildesheim Cathedral and Hartwig chandelier in Comburg Abbey.

== Bibliography ==
- Die Zeit der Staufer. Geschichte – Kunst – Kultur. Katalog der Ausstellung Band 1, Stuttgart 1977, S. 396-398 Nr. 537.
- Clemens Bayer: Die beiden großen Inschriften des Barbarossa-Leuchters. In: Clemens Bayer (ed.): Celica Jherusalem. Festschrift für Erich Stephany. Köln 1986. S. 213-240.
- Herta Lepie, Lothar Schmidt: Der Barbarossaleuchter im Dom zu Aachen. Aachen, Einhard, 1998 (ISBN 3-930701-46-4)
- Georg Minkenberg: Der Barbarossaleuchter im Dom zu Aachen. In: Zeitschrift des Aachener Geschichtsverein, 96 (1989) p. 69-102.
- Hann Wimmer. The iconographic programme of the Barbarossa Candelabrum in the Palatine Chapel at Aachen. A re-interpretation. In: Immediations 1, 2005, 2, p. 24-39.
