= Baptismal font (Hildesheim) =

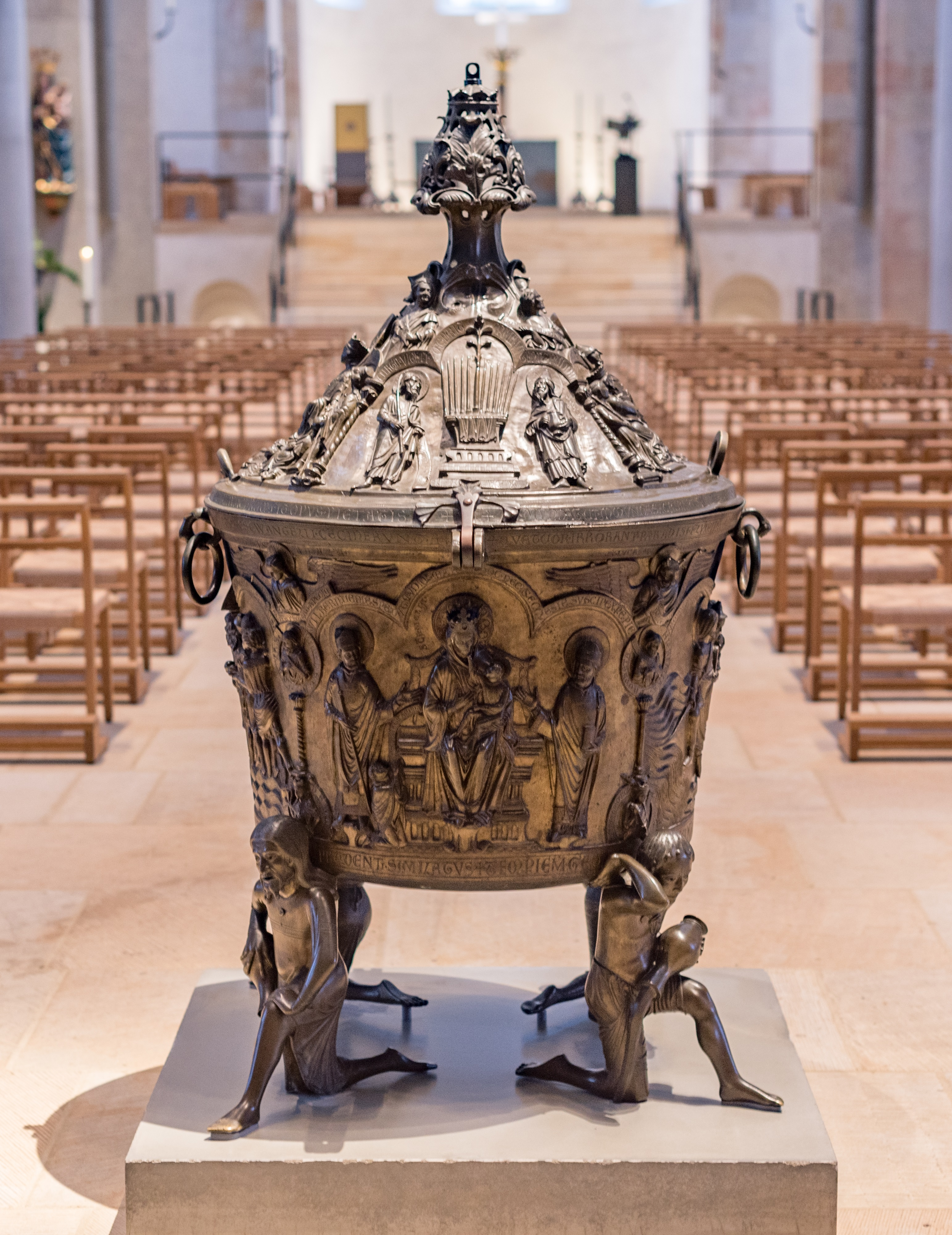
- The bronze baptismal font in the Hildesheim Cathedral

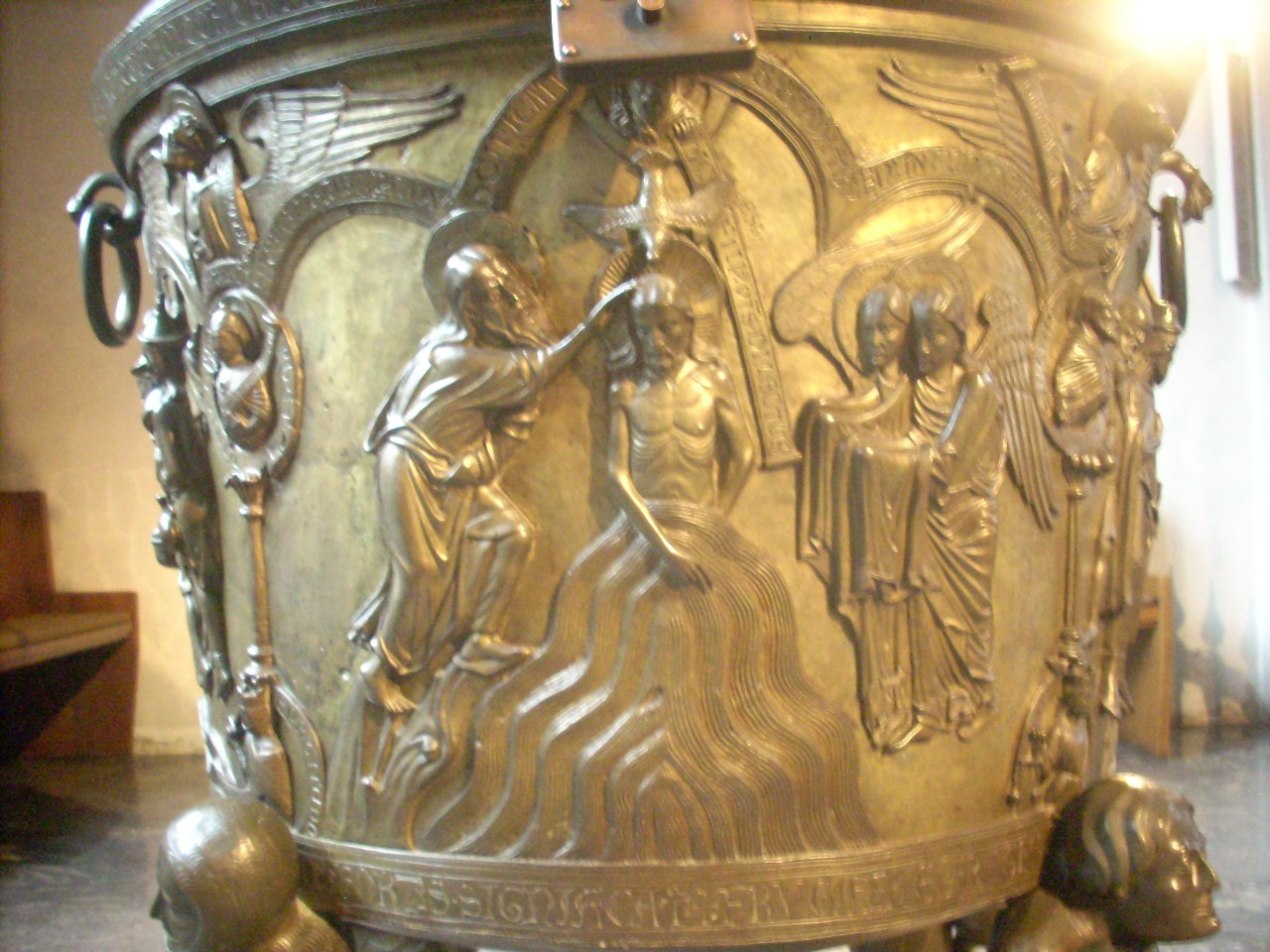
- Material: Bronze
- Size: 1.7 m
- Created: Thirteenth century
- Present location: Hildesheim Cathedral

The Bronze baptismal font (German: Bronzetaufe) in the Hildesheim Cathedral is a late Romanesque baptismal font which was probably made in Hildesheim in the first third of the thirteenth century. It is noted for its pictorial decoration which is of the highest quality and for its perfect proportions and is considered among the most outstanding works of its type. For centuries the baptismal font stood in the western part of the nave, until it was moved to the last of the northern side-chapels (George's chapel) in 1653. During the ongoing renovations of the cathedral (2010–2014) it is being displayed in the Bode Museum in Berlin. After the completion of the renovation work, it will be placed in the centre of the nave under the Hezilo chandelier.

== Description ==
The font is made up of a round pot, which widens towards the top, a tapering lid with four allegorical figures and a bauble on top. It has a total height of 1.7 m and a diameter of 96 cm.

The lively decorative style foreshadows Gothic art, but also shows a Byzantine influence, especially in the architectural elements. The postures and faces of the figures are especially emotionally expressive.

== Image program ==
The image program, divided into three horizontal bands and four vertical columns, is of great symbolic significance. The imagery can be interpreted on a number of levels and offers an ascetic and biblical understanding of the font overall. The imagers are further explained by Latin titles and inscriptions.

The lowest band shows four human figures, which support the whole font. These are personifications of the four rivers of the Garden of Eden (Genesis 2:10–14). Each of them pours out the water of life: at baptism what was dried up by sin, begins to flow once more. The four figures are clearly distinct in clothing, posture, and hairstyle and symbolise different classes and phases of life. In a small area above their heads, they are identified with the cardinal virtues: moderation, valor, justice, and wisdom. In this respect, the armour worn by the figure labelled as valour is particularly notable. The natural virtues were meant to be brought to fulfillment by the act of baptism.

The second level, on the body of the font, shows the most significant aspects of baptism with four scenes from the Old and New Testaments:

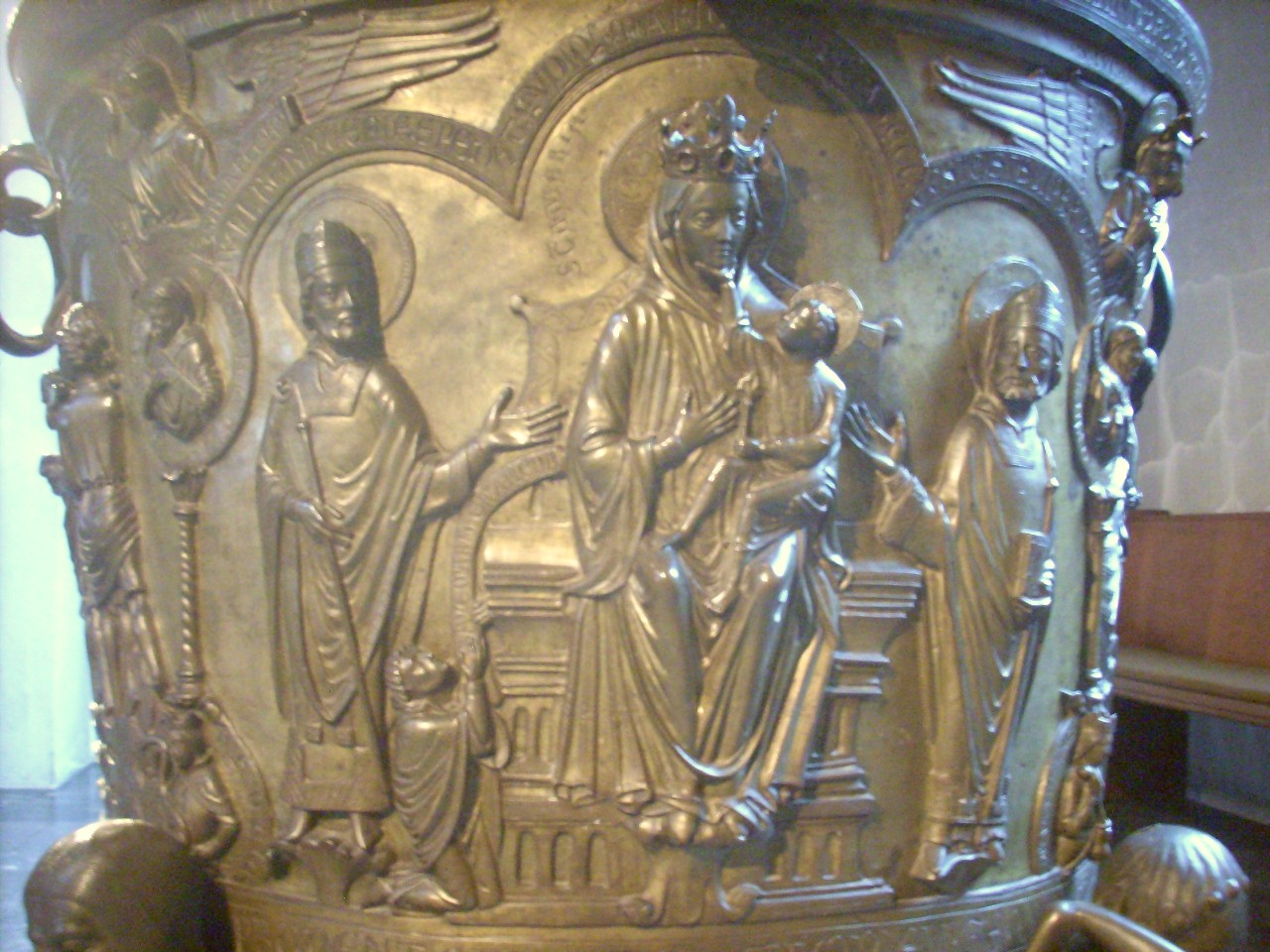
Mary with child (donor portrait)

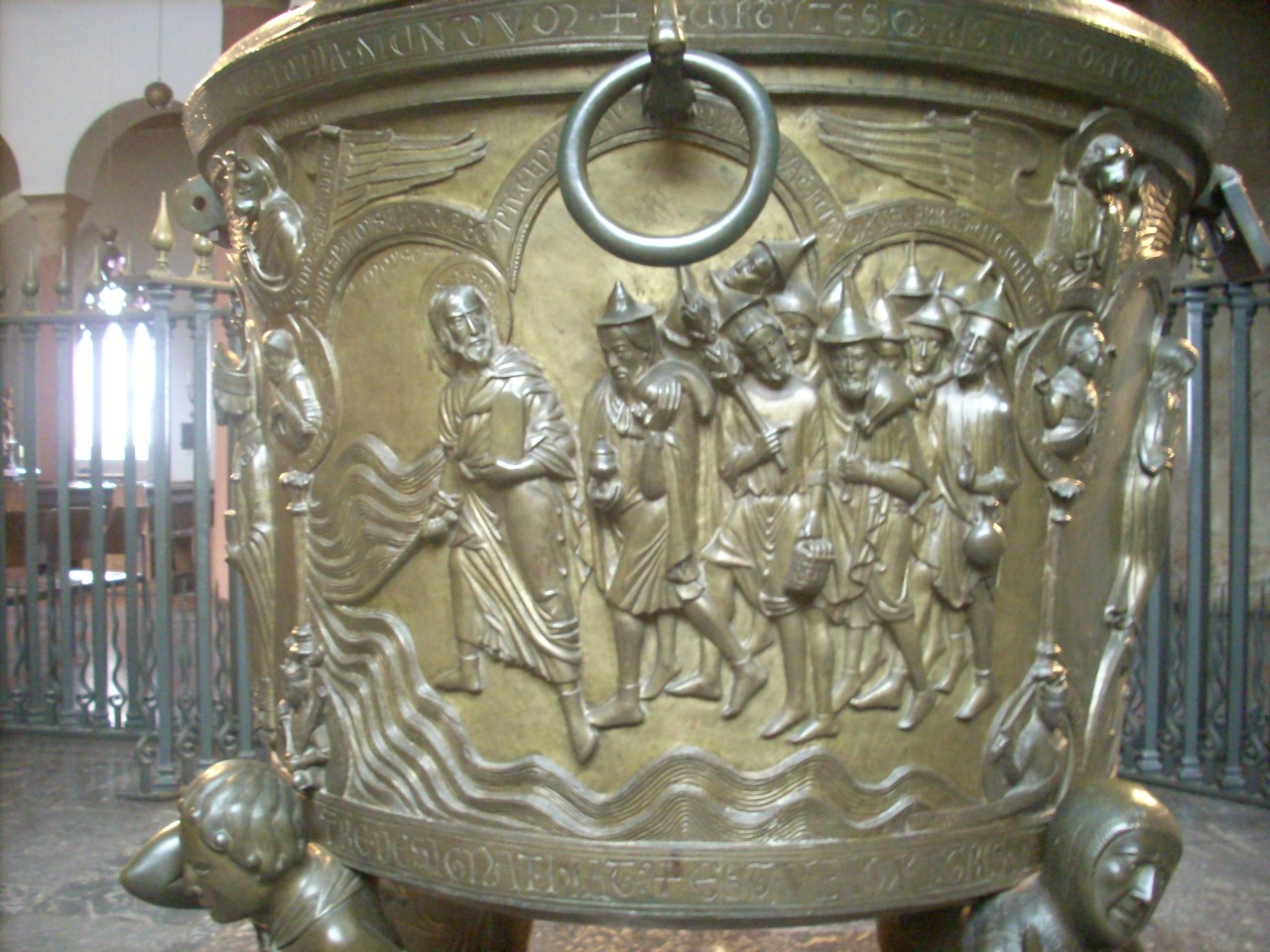
Parting the Red Sea

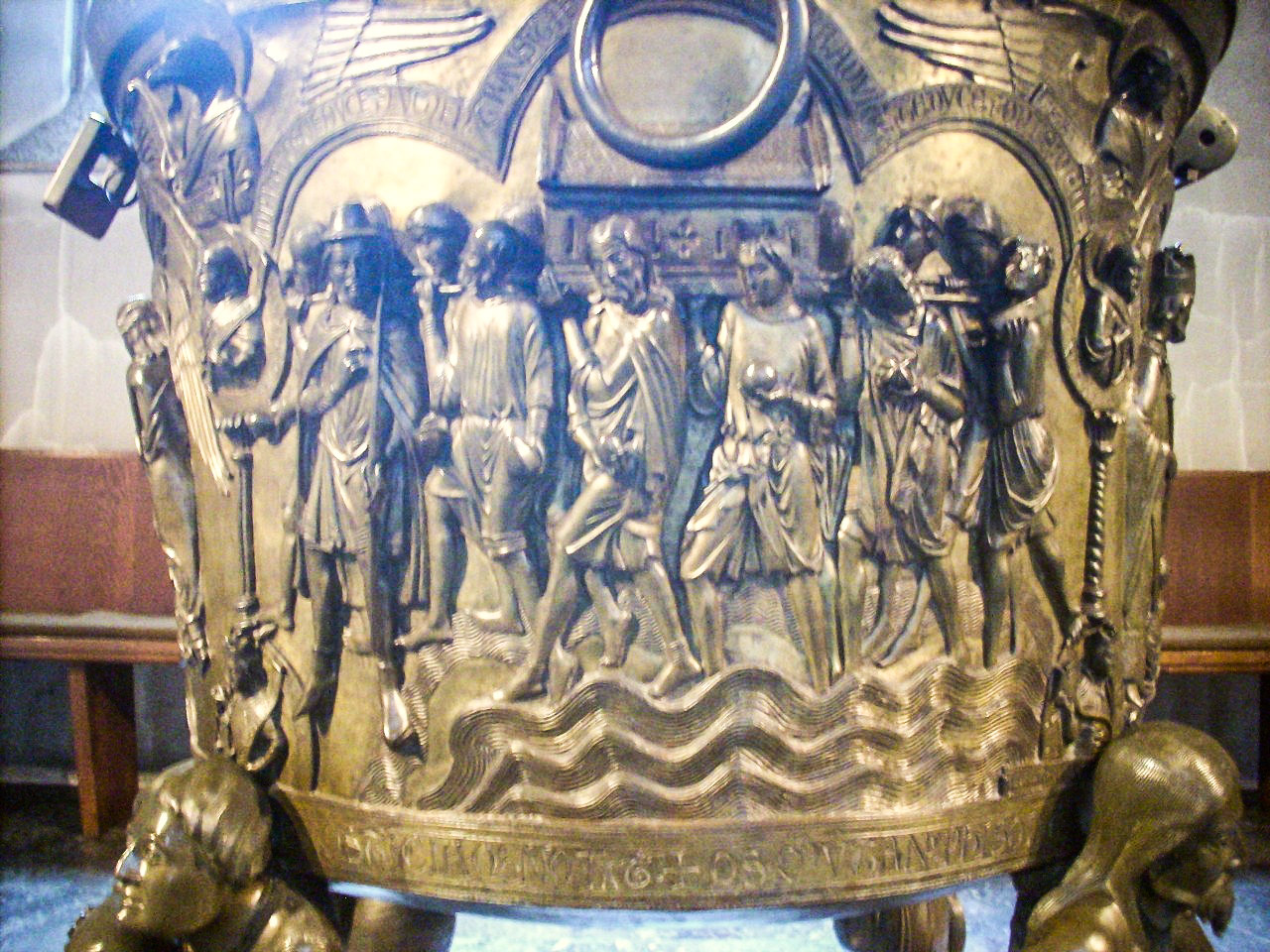
Crossing the Jordan
- The baptism of Jesus indicates that the experience of the baptised is shared with Christ, as is death and resurrection (Romans 6:3–8).
- The image of Mary with the baby Jesus on the opposite side places Jesus' mother before the eyes of the baptised; by their baptism she becomes their mother and advocate. She is depicted with the other patrons of the cathedral, Epiphanius of Pavia and Godehard of Hildesheim, symbolising the Communion of saints to which the baptised now belonged. This scene is probably also the donor portrait, since a small figure, whose name is given as "Wilbern" kneels at Mary's feet. This is probably Wilbrand van Oldenburg who was canon of Hildesheim Cathedral at the time the font was made.
- The depiction of the Israelites, indicated by their Jewish hats, crossing the Red Sea (Exodus 14) with Moses, connects the immersion and emergence from the baptismal font with the peril, salvation, and freeing of Israel and through that connection declares all the baptised to be members of God's chosen people, on their way to the Promised Land.
- The fourth image shows the return to the Promised Land by fording the River Jordan (Joshua 3). Everyone helps to carry the Ark of the Covenant which contains the Ten Commandments they received at Sinai. This symbolises the duty of the baptised to the one God and his will, which is contained in the covenant of baptism.

The next layer up is the four scenes on the lid. They present the significance of baptism for the Christian life.

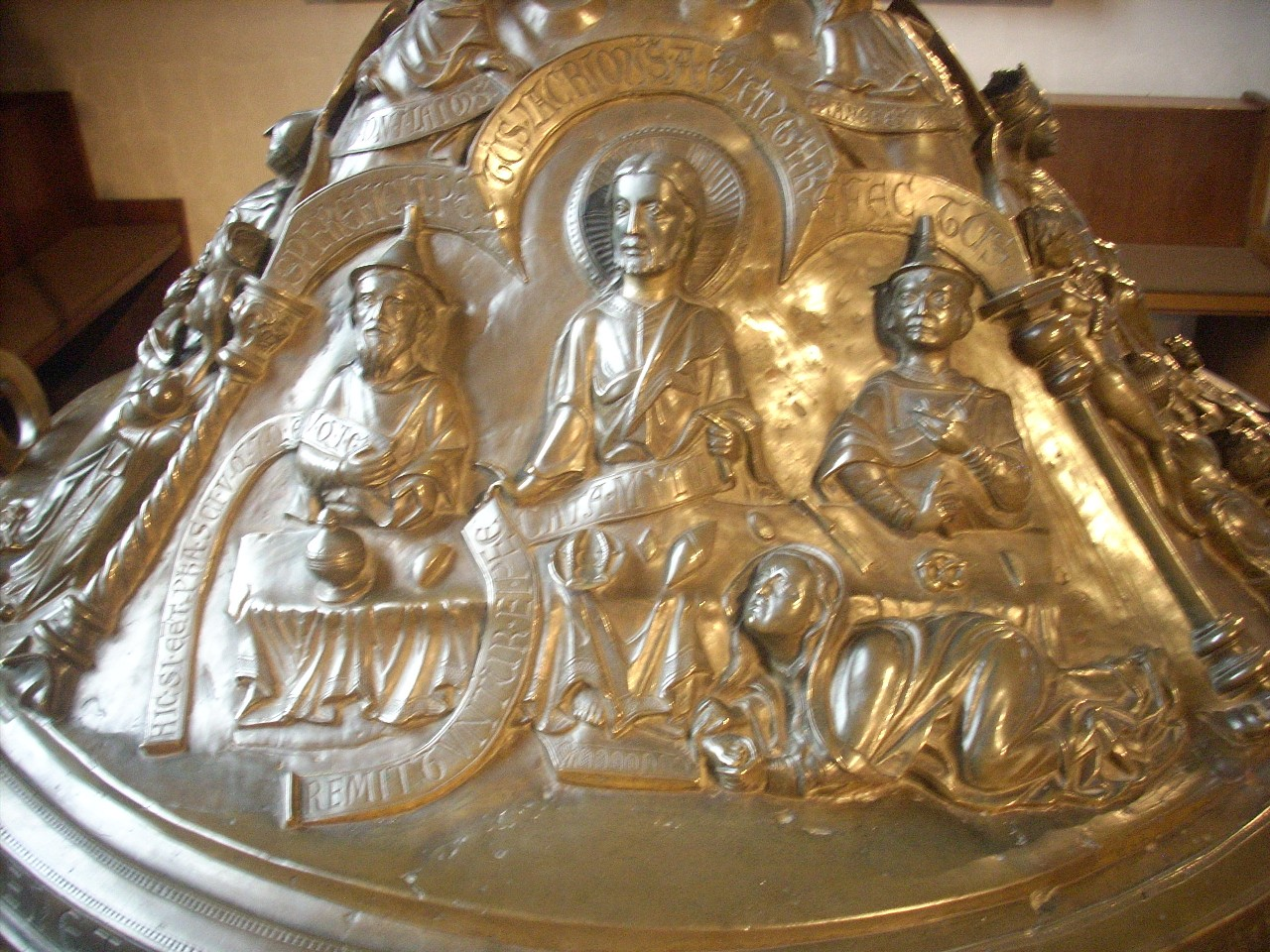
The Anointing of Jesus

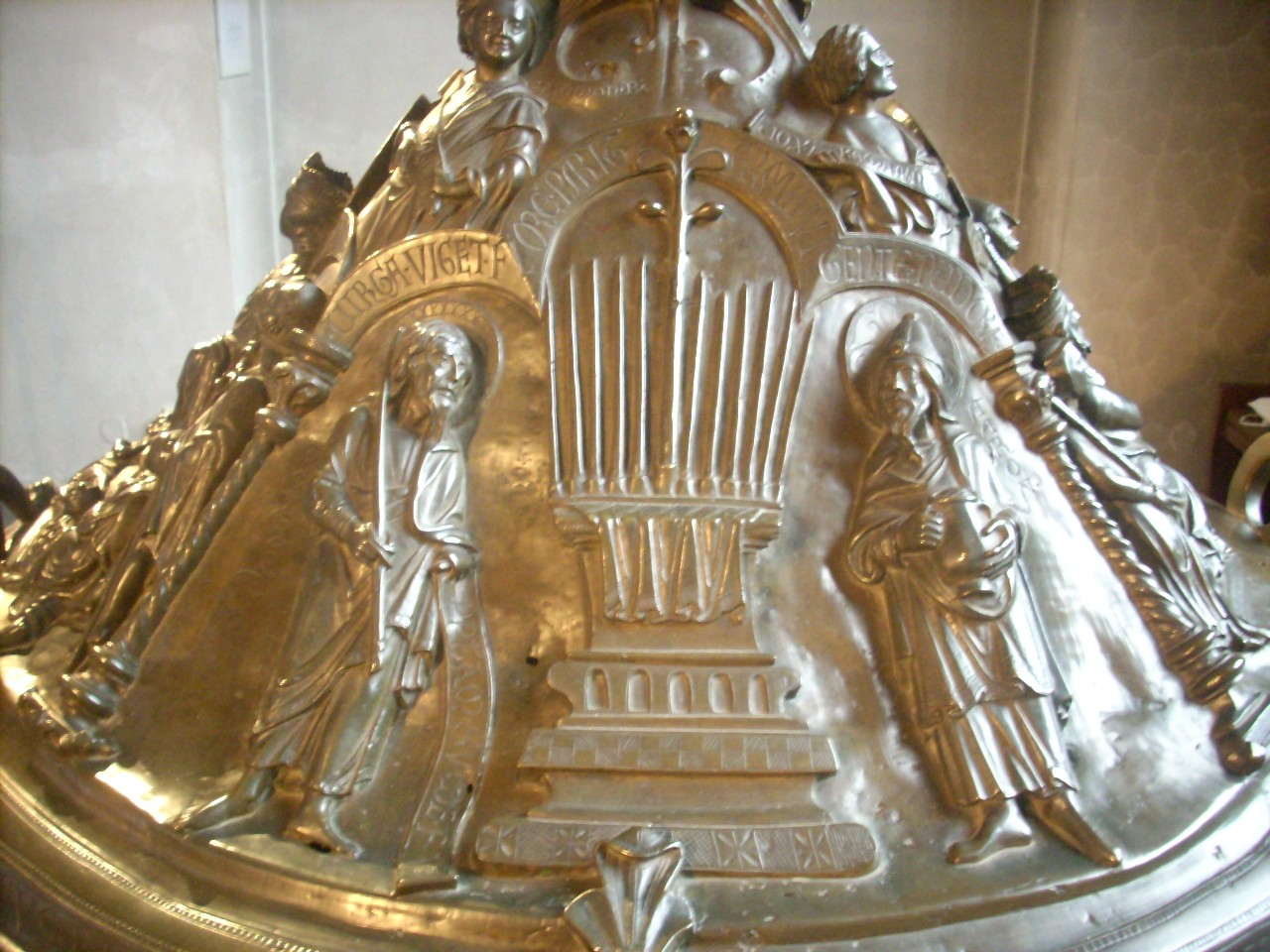
The blossoming of Aaron's rod

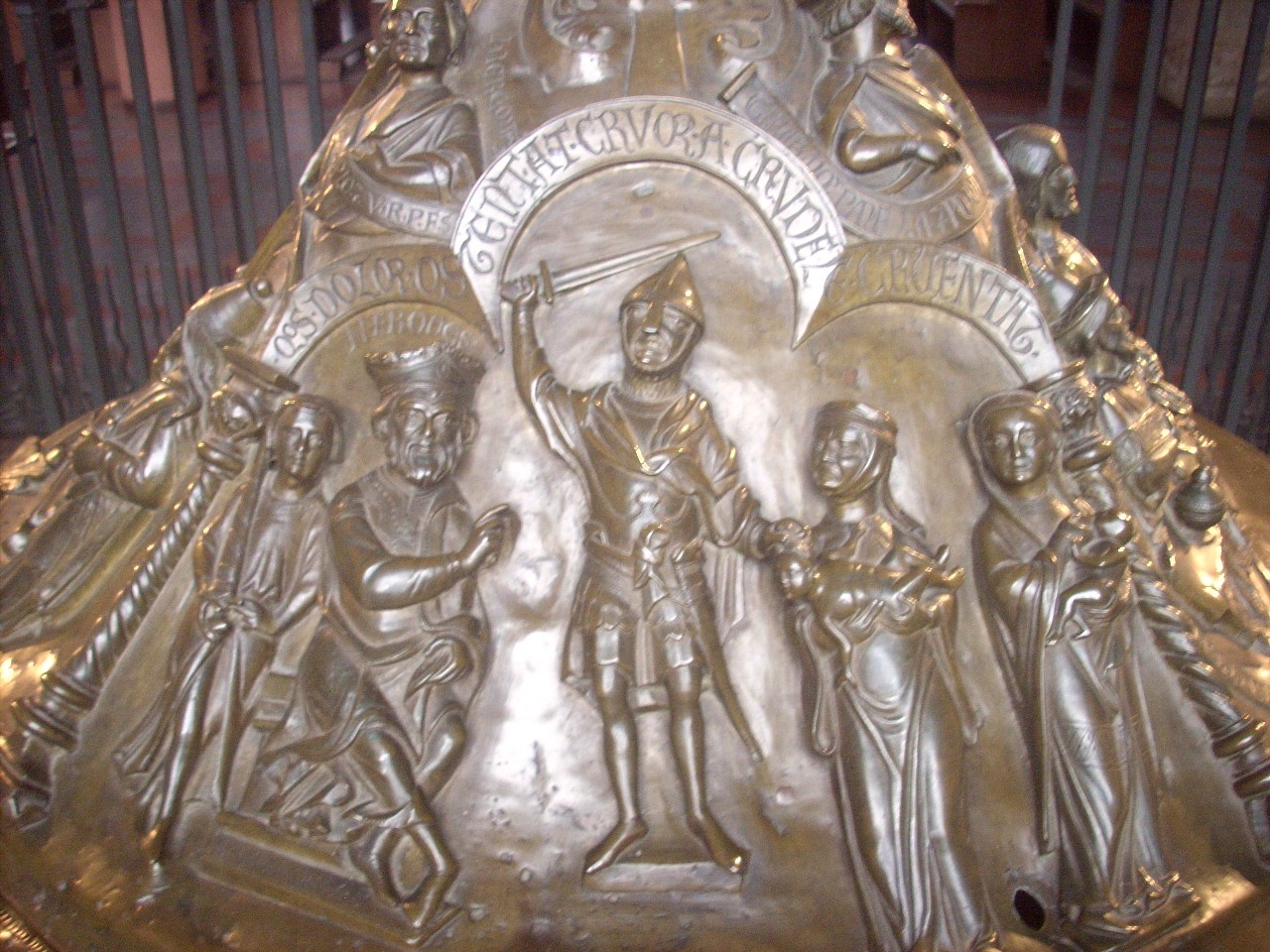
The Massacre of the Innocents

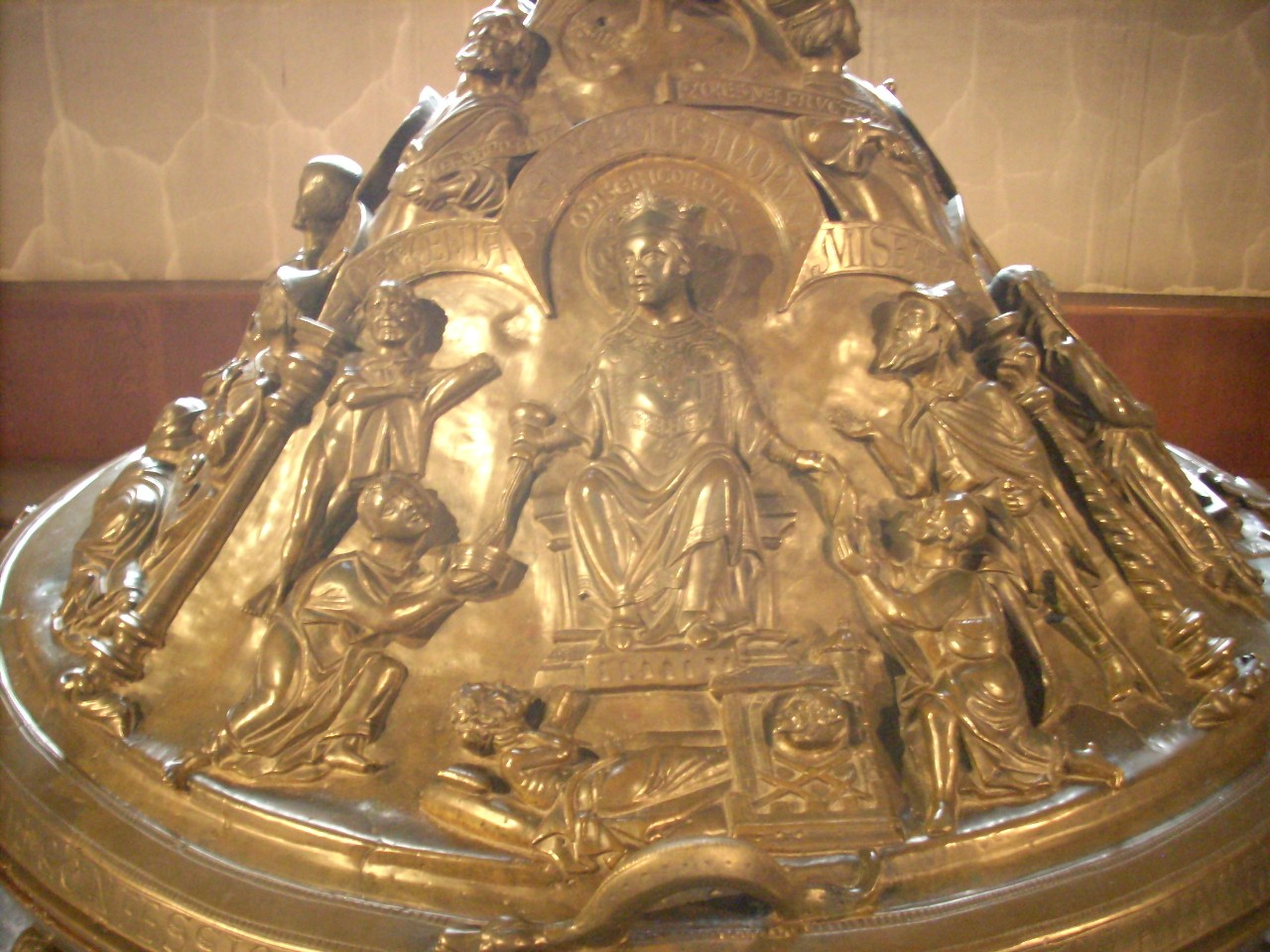
Personification of Mercy
- The image of the Anointing of Jesus by the prostitute (traditionally equated with Mary Magdalene (Luke 7:36–59) demonstrates remorse and repentance, as well as the inexhaustibility of Grace and the love originating from it.
- The blossoming of Aaron's rod (Numbers 17) opposite, symbolised Mary's fruitful virginity and the chastity of the baptised.
- The Massacre of the Innocents (Matthew 2:16–18) recalls the fellowship shared by all the baptised with Christ in witnessing their faith (Greek μαρτύριον) and the possibility of the baptism of blood.
- The personification of Misericordia finally, a woman enthroned as a queen, performing Works of Mercy, shows how the grace of baptism concretely effects life.

Vertically, the baptism of Christ correlates with his anointment by the prostitute, the Mother of God with the staff of Aaron, the Exodus with the Massacre of the Innocents and the Ark of the Covenant with the personification of Mercy.

Narrow columns rise up from the personifications of the rivers in between the scenes, which support triple arches above each scene. Their bases name the cardinal virtues and they show further biblical figures in the spaces between scenes above their capitals (sometimes the same figures are repeated), with the animals symbolising each of the evangelists above these spaces on the main body of the font:

- Moderation - Jeremiah - Luke - Jeremiah
- Valour - Daniel - Mark - King David
- Justice - Ezekiel - John - Isaiah
- Wisdom - Isaiah- Matthew - King Solomon.

These arrangements are also significant.

== Bibliography ==
- Victor H. Elbern. Dom und Domschatz in Hildesheim. Königstein i. T. 1979, pp. 16f. and 48f.
- Claudia Höhl. Das Taufbecken des Wilbernus - Schätze aus dem Dom zu Hildesheim. Verlag Schnell & Steiner GmbH, Regensburg 2009, ISBN 978-3-7954-2047-5
