= Wheel chandelier =

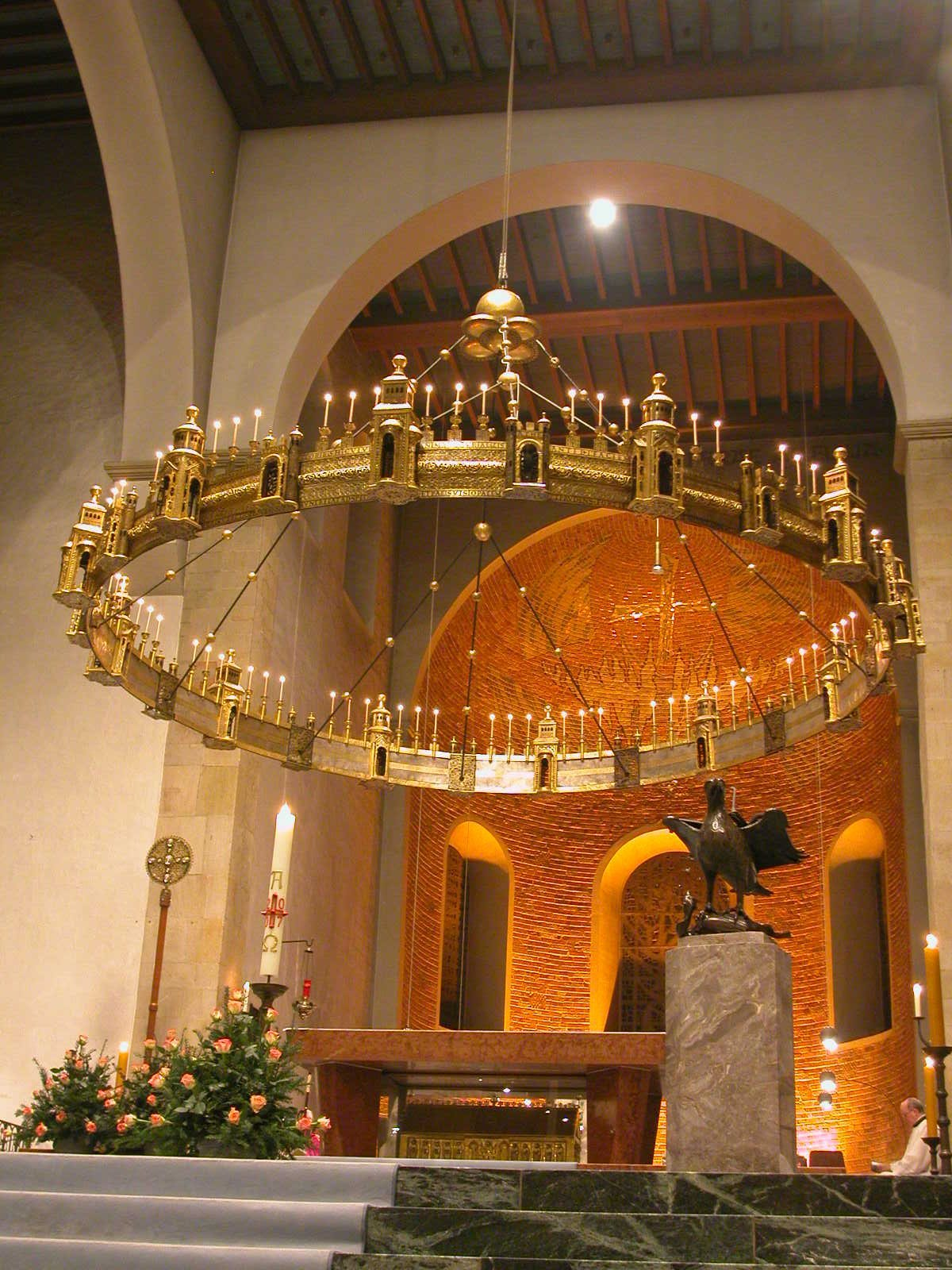
Hezilo chandelier in Hildesheim Cathedral

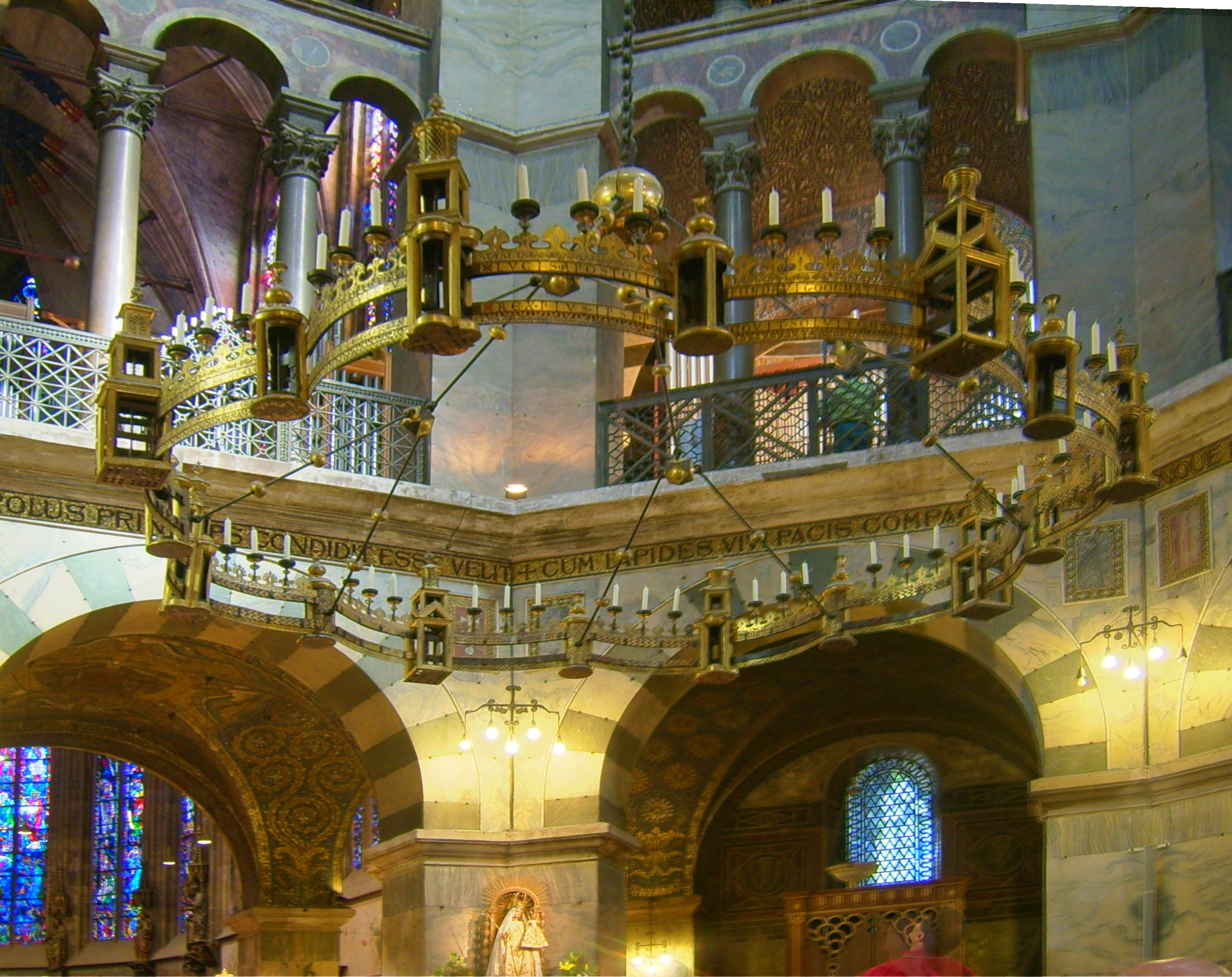
Barbarossa chandelier in Aachen Cathedral

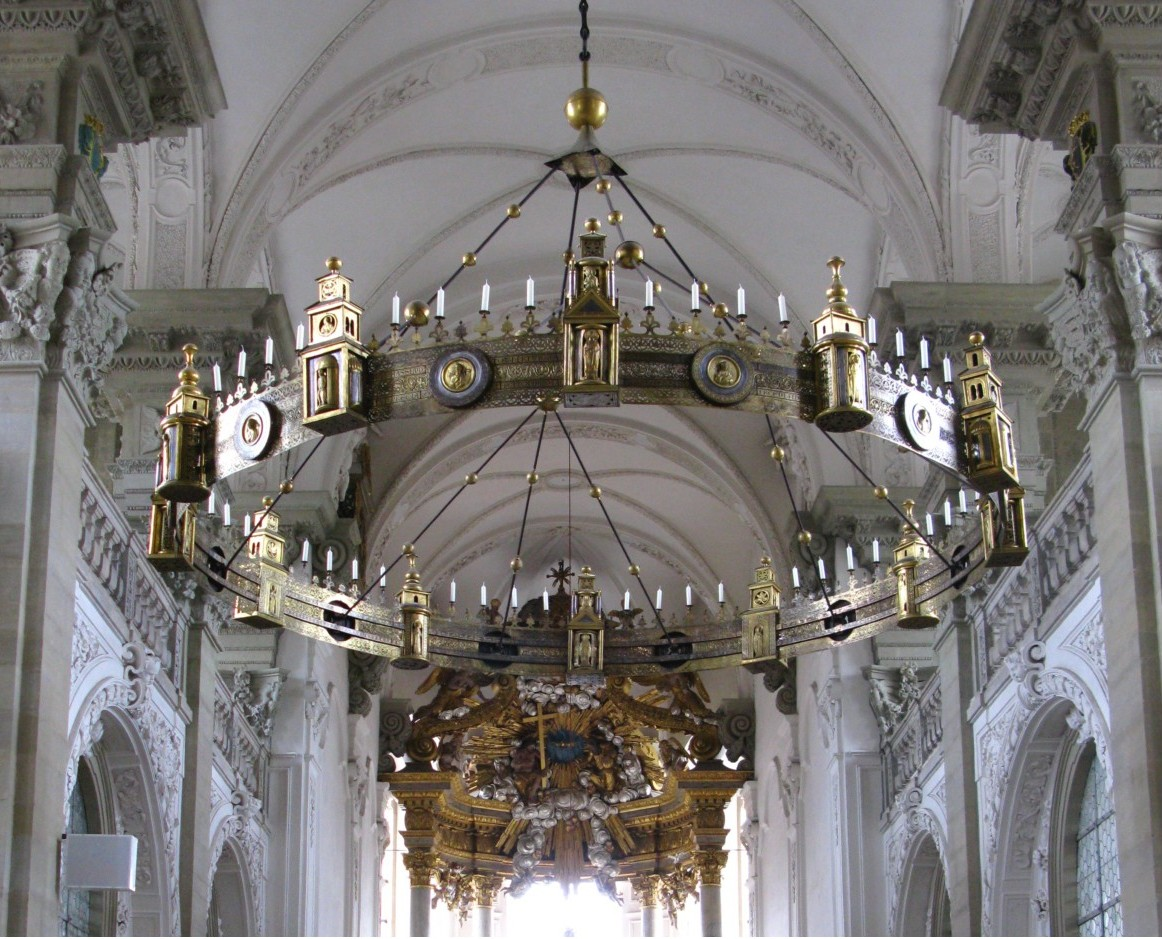
Hartwig's chandelier in Comburg

A wheel chandelier is a lighting installment, in the form of a chandelier hanging from the ceiling in the form of a spoked wheel. The oldest and most important examples derive from the Romanesque period.

Wheel chandeliers were made for the practical purpose of lighting the great churches and other public areas, but in religion they also had symbolic significance, depicting the Garden of Eden or the Kingdom of God. The wheel, its gates, and its towers, which are usually decorated with Prophets and Apostles or inscribed with their names, symbolise the city walls of the New Jerusalem. The buttresses, towers, and candles number twelve or a multiple of twelve, after the numerology of the Book of Revelation. This symbolism is first found on two wheel chandeliers of Hildesheim Cathedral. The great wheel chandelier of the Church of the Holy Sepulchre was an inspiration.

== Romanesque wheel chandeliers ==
In Germany there are four great Romanesque wheel chandeliers. The fact that they are made from fire-gilt copper and not from pure gold has saved them from being melted down. They were decorated with Prophets and angels in silver and with precious gemstones, but for the most part these have been lost.

- The Barbarossa chandelier in Aachen Cathedral is attributed to Frederick Barbarossa (1122–1190).
- Hartwig's chandelier in Comburg, Schwäbisch Hall, with a 5-metre diameter, from the 12th century (also called Himmlische Jerusalem(Heavenly Jerusalem) with saints and soldiers in the towers.
- Hezilo chandelier in Hildesheim Cathedral with a 6-metre diameter, a donation of Bishop Hezilo of Hildesheim (1054–79).
- Azelin chandelier in Hildesheim Cathedral with a donation inscription of Bishop Thietmar of Hildesheim (1038–44).

== Gothic wheel chandeliers ==
The wheel chandeliers of the Gothic period in Germany are smaller in size than the Romanesque ones, and they are no longer representations of Jerusalem. The chandelier made of brass in Münster Cathedral has a circular pierced rim decorated with a few statuettes on its side, and ornamented with tracery-work like filigree and pinnacles. In the Minster Church of St. Alexander in Einbeck there is a later gothic wheel chandelier of painted brass with a diameter of c. 3.5 metres. The inscription on its bracket dates it to 1420. It was presumably gifted by Degenhard Ree, a canon of the collegiate church. The composition ought to go back to a lost example in Pöhlde Cloister.

Another Gothic example is one in bronze found in the Cathedral of St. Stephan and St. Sixtus in Halberstadt (1516).

== Neo-Romanesque wheel chandeliers ==
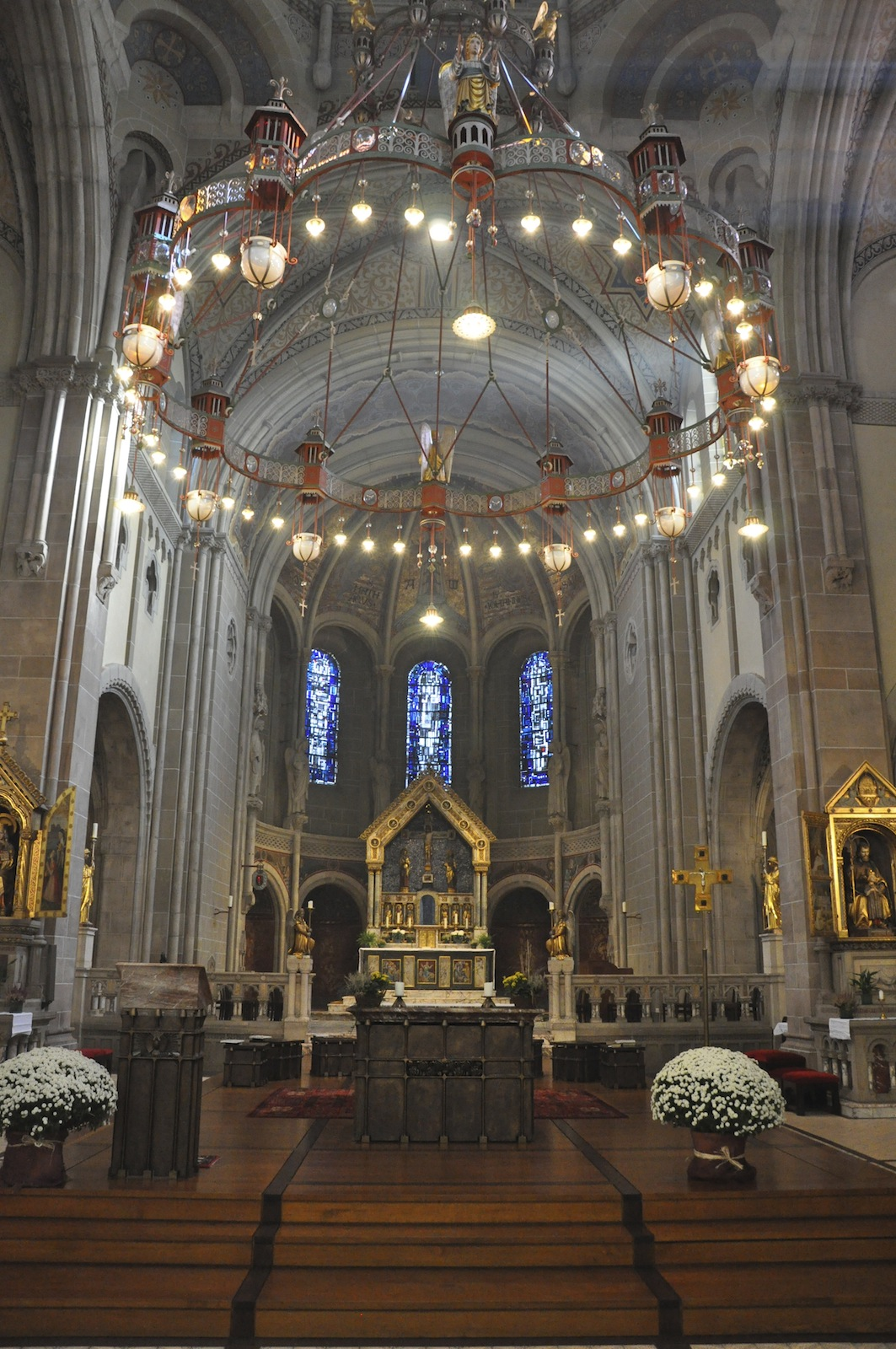
Electric wheel chandelier in St. Elisabeth Bonn

In some neo-Romanesque churches there are large wheel chandeliers too. Some of these were electric even when they were first installed Some examples:

- St. Godehard's Basilica in Hildesheim, gifted in 1864 by Marie of Saxe-Altenburg
- St. Cäcilia in Harsum (c.1886)
- Saint-Pierre-le-Jeune in Strasbourg (c.1890)
- Bethlehemkirche in Hannover (c.1904)
- St. Elisabeth in Bonn under contemporary frescoes in the dome (c. 1910) (electrified from installation)

== Contemporary wheel chandeliers ==
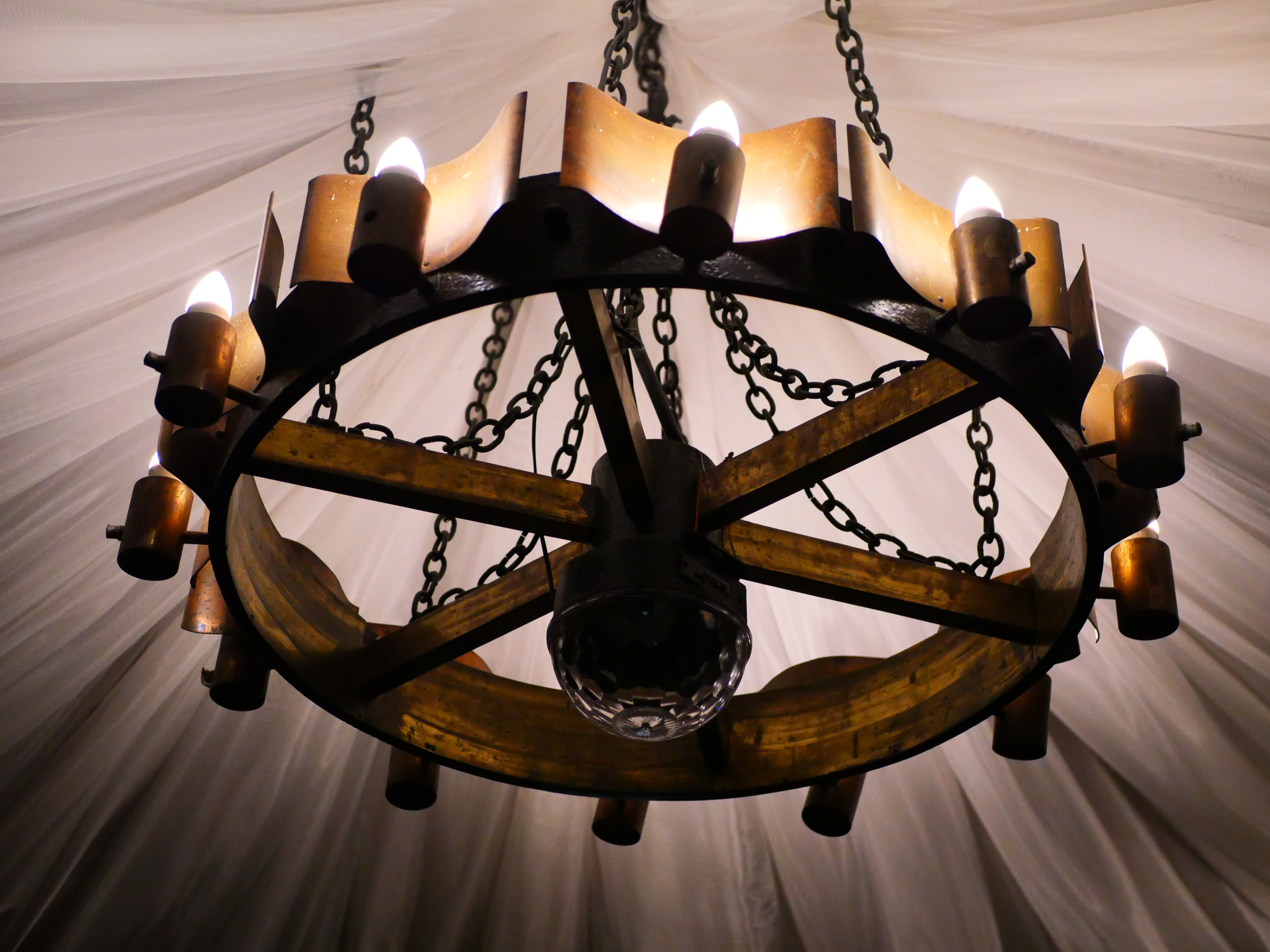
Wagon wheel chandelier

There are also contemporary wheel chandeliers, which continue this tradition:

- Herrenhäuser Kirche in Hannover (c. 1990)
- Great St. Martin Church in Cologne (before 1993)
- Church of Kloster Lippoldsberg (1999)

== Wagon wheel ==
Another type is the wagon wheel chandelier. As its name suggests, it is usually made from old wagon wheels. As opposite to most of the wheel chandeliers, wagon wheel chandeliers were usually created as a cheap way to lighten the common spaces of large houses, businesses and public halls. Most of them were made from wood reinforced with steel.

== Bibliography ==
- Sedlmayr, Hans (1993). Die Entstehung der Kathedrale (in German). Freiburg im Breisgau: Herder. pp. 125–130. ISBN 978-3-451-04181-5.
- Clemens Bayer: Die beiden großen Inschriften des Barbarossa-Leuchters. In: Celica Jherusalem. Festschrift für Erich Stephany. Hrsg. Clemens Bayer. Köln 1986. S. 213–240
- Bernhard Gallistl: Bedeutung und Gebrauch der großen Lichterkrone im Hildesheimer Dom. In: Concilium Medii Aevi 12 (2009) S. 43–88 (PDF; 2,9 MB)
- Rolf Dieter Blumer, Ines Frontzek: Recherchiert und kartiert. Der Comburger Hertwig-Leuchter. In: Denkmalpflege in Baden-Württemberg, 41. Jahrgang 2012, Heft 4, S. 194–199 (PDF)
- "Kloster Groß-Comburg". Zentrale für Unterrichtsmedien im Internet e.V. (in German).
- Lubke, Wilhelm (1873). Ecclesiastical Art in Germany.
