= Thietmar of Hildesheim =

Thietmar of Hildesheim, also Tymmo, Tiemo, Thietmarus, Thetmarus, Thiatmarus, Diothmarus, Deotharus, T(h)etmarus, Detmarus, Deithmarus, Teythmarus, (died 14 November 1044 in Hildesheim) was Bishop of Hildesheim from 1038 to 1044.

He was a native Dane. He was first mentioned when he accompanied Gunhilda, the daughter of Canute the Great, to Nijmegen, where she married Henry III on June 29, 1036, and took the name of Cunegonde. He was chaplain to the Queen, and thus a member of the royal court orchestra.

Thietmar was appointed Bishop of the diocese of Hildesheim on 5 May 1038. On 20 August he received episcopal consecration in Lorsch by Archbishop Bardo of Mainz. In 1039 he appointed Adelaide, daughter of Otto II, as abbess in Gandersheim Abbey.

He is buried in Hildesheim Cathedral in the crypt next to Bishop Godehard of Hildesheim.
