= Comburg =

Former Benedictine abbey in Germany

Coordinates: 49°06′01″N 9°44′59″E

Imperial Abbey of Comburg Reichsabtei Großcomburg
- 1078–1587
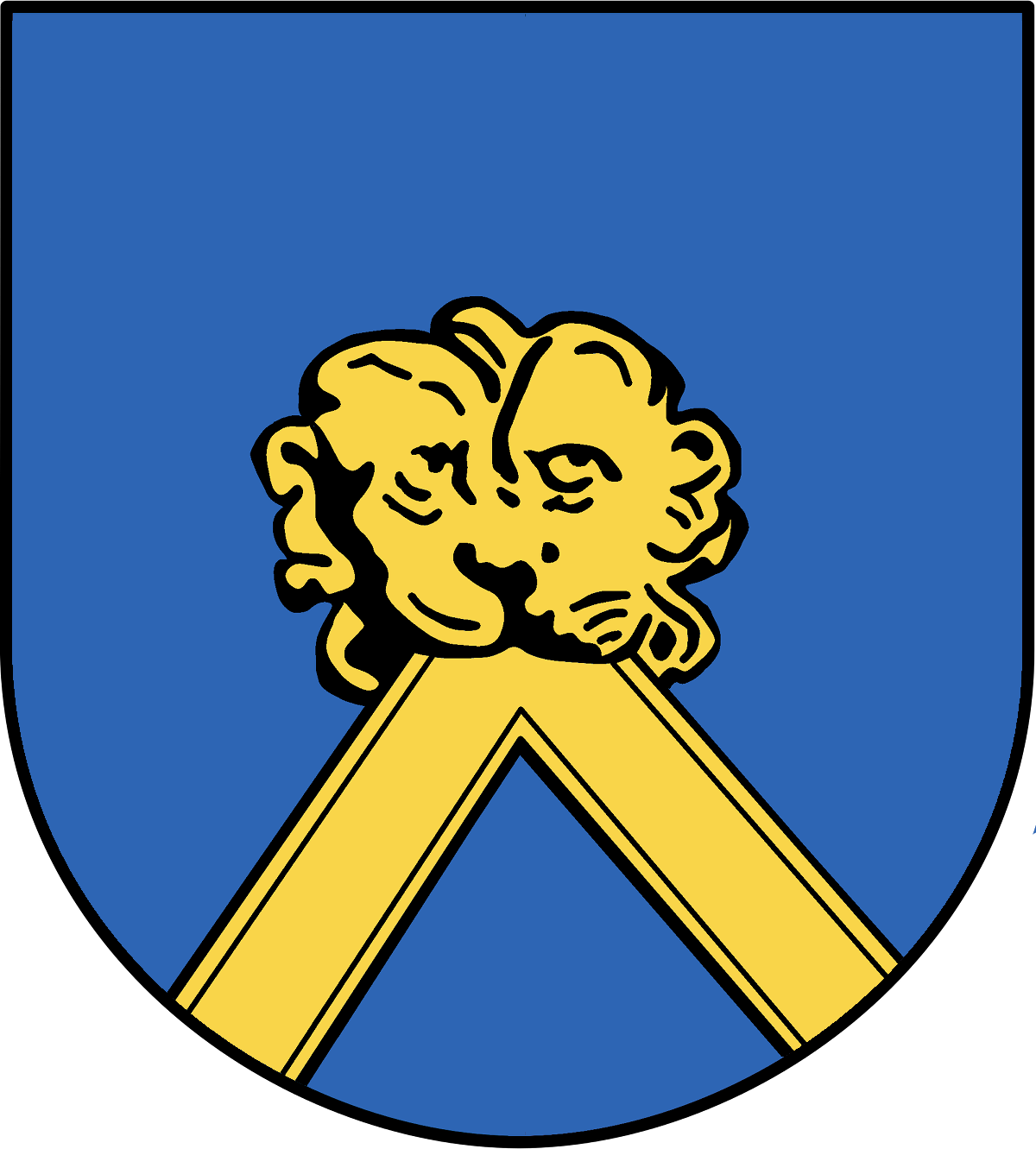
- Coat of arms

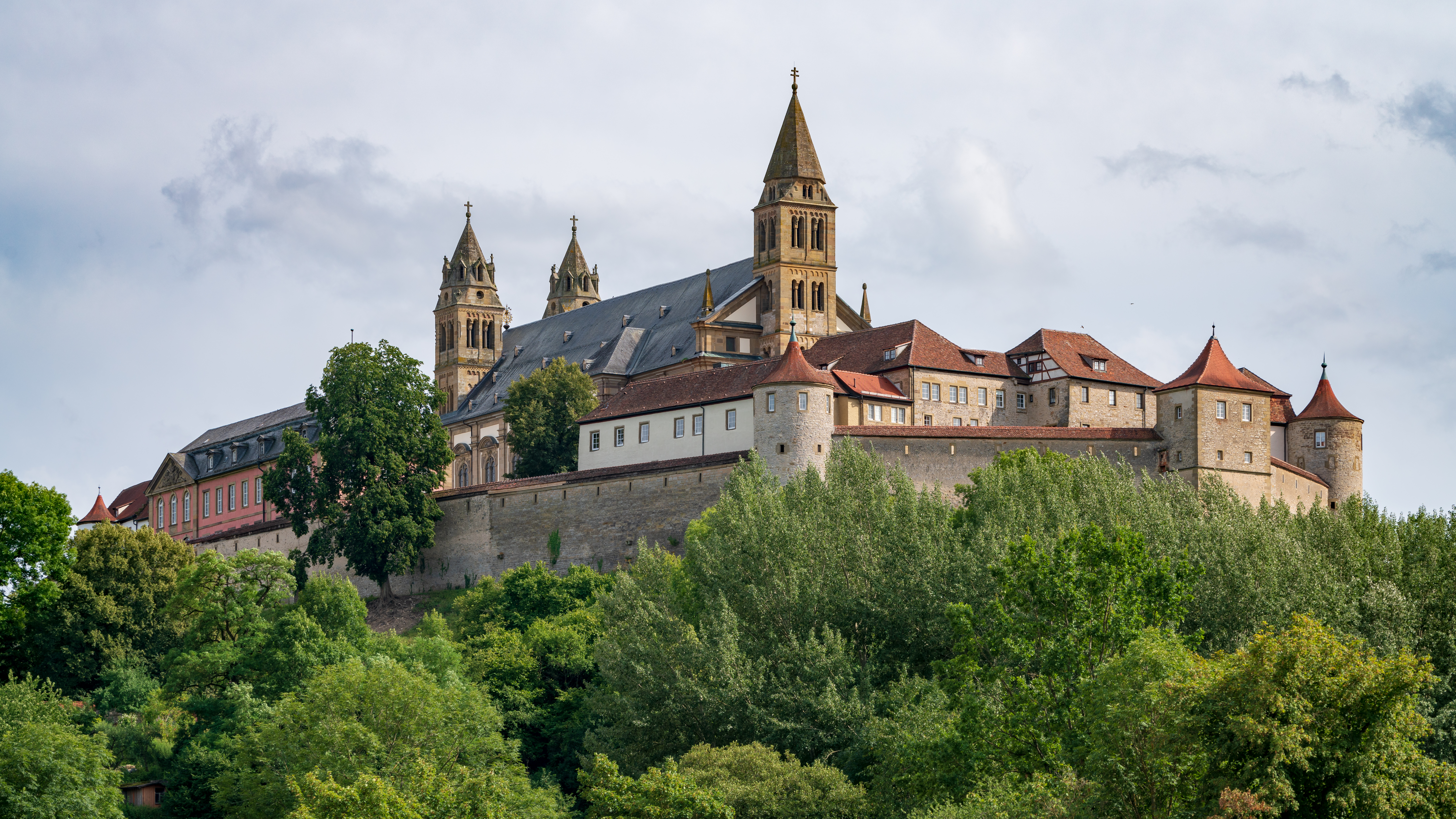
- The Comburg seen from the Steinbach Valley
- Status: Imperial Abbey
- History
  - Founded, with immediacy: 1078
  - Converted to collegiate foundation: 1488
  - Ceded to Württemberg: 1587
Preceded by	Succeeded by
Comburg-Rothenburg	Duchy of Württemberg

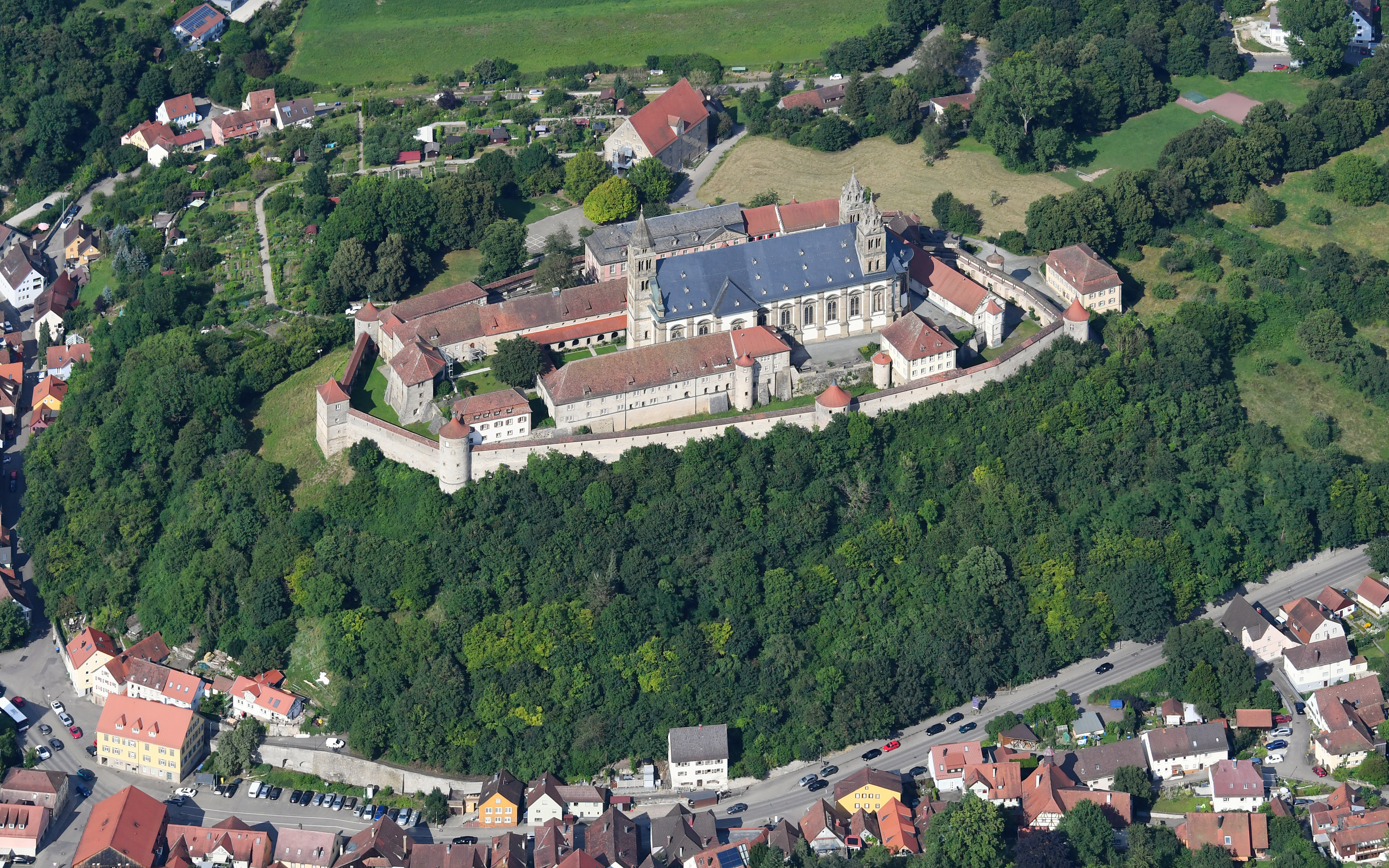
Aerial view of the Comburg

The Comburg (German: [ˈkɔmbʊʁk]; also Grosscomburg) is a former Benedictine monastery near Schwäbisch Hall, Germany.

== History ==
In 1078, Burkhardt II, Count of Rothenburg-Comburg, donated his family's ancestral castle, on a hill overlooking the Kocher river and the town of Schwäbisch Hall, to the Benedictine Order for the establishment of an abbey and joined the order. The Counts of Rothenburg-Comburg, who also owned Hall and its salt flats, became the vögte of the abbey until their family became extinct in the early 12th century. Their possessions were inherited by the House of Hohenstaufen, remained the protectors of the monastery until it transferred authority over the Comburg to the now Free Imperial City of Schwäbisch Hall in 1348.

Not long after its founding, the Comburg became associated with Hirsau Abbey and in 1086 integrated the Hirsau Reforms. As a result, it received several portions of donated land from which it began to flourish. Under its third abbot, Hertwig of Hirsau, the Comburg reached the apex of its fortunes in the early 13th century, operating a scriptorium and possibly a metal foundry on its grounds. In the 14th century, however, the Comburg faced economic downturn and began to borrow money, occasionally being obliged to pledge its treasures as collateral. These difficulties were to be long-lasting; from the 13th to the 15th centuries, the parishes of Steinbach, Tüngental, Gebsattel, Künzelsau, and Erlach-Gelbingen were not served by monks.

From the beginning of the 14th century, the monks of the Comburg came from the gentry of Schwäbisch Hall and from the mid-15th century Franconian noble families. The Bishop of Würzburg assumed temporal responsibility for the Comburg in 1485 and, three years later, transformed the Comburg into a collegiate church that would only admit nobles. This close connection with Würzburg allowed the Comburg to survive the Reformation and retain its properties, despite Schwäbisch Hall and the surrounding towns converting to Protestantism. The monks of the Comburg also maintained close ties to Ellwangen Abbey.

=== Secularization ===
The conquests of Napoleon and the resulting German mediatization ended the ecclesiastical functions of the monastery. The Comburg and its estates were divided between the Electorate of Württemberg and the Electorate of Bavaria in 1802. Württemberg was awarded almost all of Comburg's remaining properties and the Comburg itself, which was subsequently secularized. Frederick I, Elector of Württemberg, ordered the monastery's treasure to be melted down at the royal mint in Ludwigsburg. The monastery's library was moved to the State Library in Stuttgart. From 1807 to 1810, the Comburg was the residence of Prince Paul of Württemberg and Princess Charlotte of Saxe-Hildburghausen as exiles from the court in Stuttgart for their opposition to Frederick's alliance with Napoleon.

In April 1817, Frederick assigned the Comburg to the Württemberg Invalids Honor Corps, which he had created in 1806 and originally stationed in Stuttgart, for the residence of its members and their families. The Corps remained at the Comburg until it was made redundant by military pension legislation in 1871, though it was not officially dissolved until 1909. By then, four invalids still resided at the Comburg, the last of whom died in 1925.

The Comburg housed a Heimvolkshochschule, based on the ideals of the New Education Movement from 1926 to 1936, at which point it was shut down by the Nazi government. Between 1936 and 1945, the Comburg was used for a variety of purposes, including a Hitler Youth center, a dormitory for forced laborers, and, eventually, a displaced persons camp. After the fall of Nazi Germany, the Comburg reverted to an educational purpose. Since 1947, it has been the campus of a teachers' school.

== Grounds and architecture ==
The Comburg monastic complex is perched on a hill just outside Schwäbisch Hall. At the top of the hill, forming the center of the complex, is the Church of St. Nicholas the cloister attached to its west end, which are surrounded by dormitories.

The ring wall enclosing the Comburg were built from 1560 to 1570. These were constructed on the order of the provost Erasmus Neustetter. The complex has a total of three gates on the path to the Church of St. Nicholas. The third, built in 1100, has a chapel on its upper floor.

=== Church of St. Nicholas ===
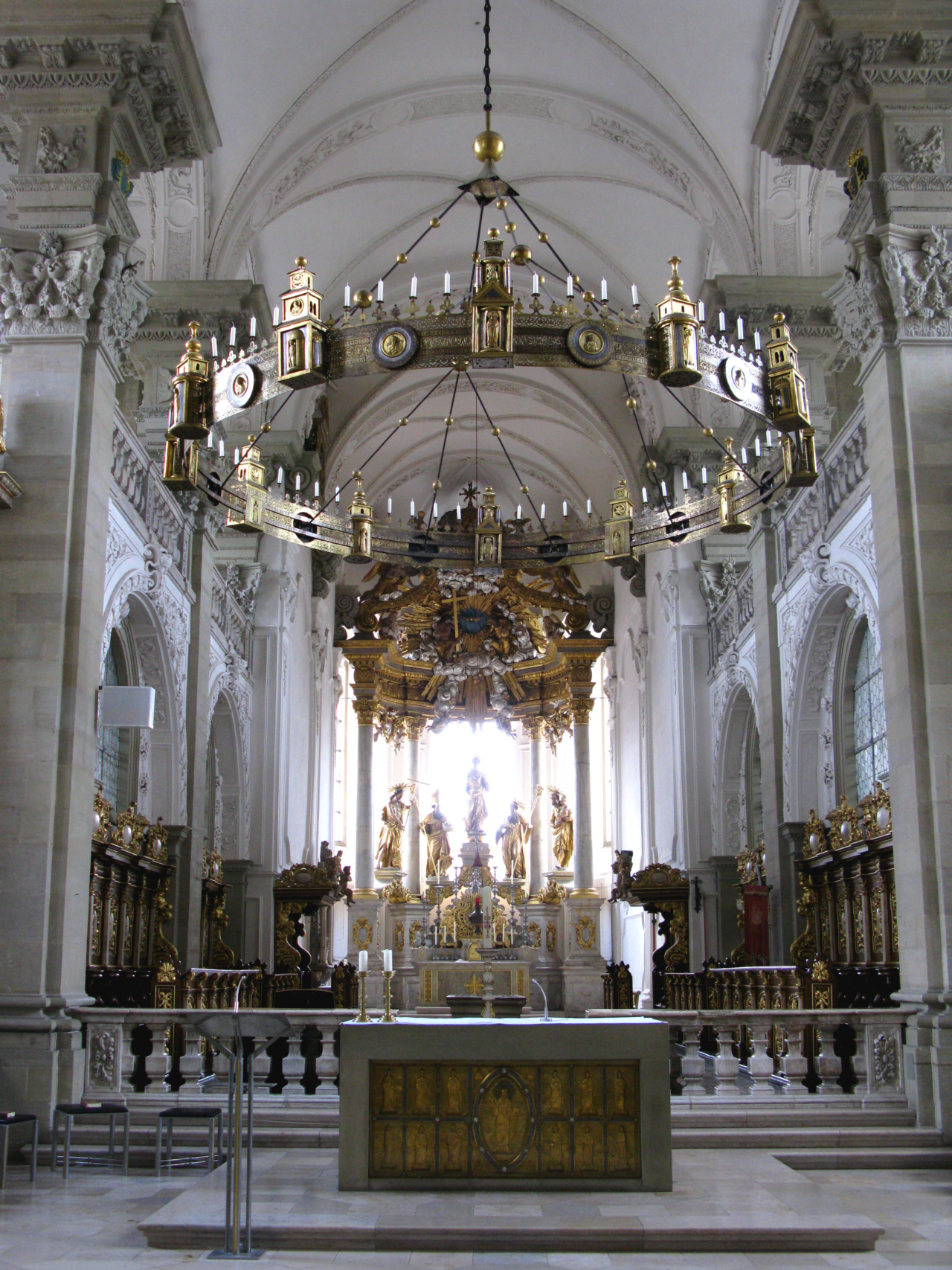
Sanctuary of the Church of St. Nicholas and the wheel chandelier

The original abbey church, a two-story tall Romanesque basilica, was built from 1078 to 1088, when it was consecrated by Adalbero, Bishop of Würzburg. Archaeological examination shows that the nave of this church measured 65 meters (213 ft) and revealed a crypt under the east choir, where Count Burkhardt's tomb is located.

With the exception of its three towers, in 1706 the Romanesque church was demolished to be replaced with a new, Baroque church designed by the architect Joseph Greissing. The new church was constructed from 1707 to 1715, when it was consecrated, by artisans from Würzburg. The retained towers survived unmodified because their remodeling exceeded the budget allotted to Greissing. The pillars are of masonry, cruciform in shape and decorated with pilasters on all four sides and topped with Classically-inspired entablatures. The church was decorated by sculptor Balthasar Esterbauer, who created its chapels, pulpit, choir stalls, and organ case. The pulpit is decorated with an image of Christ throwing lightning bolts at the seven sins personified as beautiful women.

The church also contains two medieval metal works, created between the years 1130 and 1140 and possibly within the Comburg. The first is an antependium, 78 centimeters (31 in) by 188 centimeters (74 in), fashioned from a wooden board covered with gilded copper. Embossed into the copper are images of the Twelve Apostles, six on either side of Jesus Christ, seated in a mandorla and surrounded by the symbols of the Four Evangelists. Each image is framed by cloisonné bands and gemstones. The antependium was restored in 1969. The second is a wheel chandelier, 5 meters (16 ft) in diameter, and made up by twelve gilded copper plates mounted unto two iron rings. The chandelier has four candle holders and twelve towers per plate, which altogether have 412 images on them and an inscription in Latin describing the chandelier.

The church is connected to a preserved Romanesque chapter house, housing several tomb effigies and a Romanesque lectern, dating to the earliest days of the monastery. It continued in this role until 1567, when the space was converted to a chapel dedicated to the House of Limpurg.

=== St. Erhard's Chapel ===
The hexagonal St. Erhard's Chapel dates to the first wave of building at the Comburg. It was first mentioned in 1324, but is dated to ca. 1145. It is built above a barrel-vaulted staircase leading to the slightly higher level on which the Church of St. Nicholas is built. The six sides of the chapel are thought to represent the Church of the Holy Sepulchre in Jerusalem. The interior of the chapel is decorated with frescos dating to the Romanesque and baroque periods. In the 16th century, the chapel was converted to use as an abbey archive by Provost Erasmus Neustetter.

=== St. Michael's Chapel ===
Situated above the inner gate of the Comburg is St. Michael's Chapel. The chapel is one of the oldest structures on the site, dating to ca. 1125. The inner gate's arch, towers, and porch are Romanesque, while the rest of the chapel displays gothic and baroque alterations to the original structure. The interior of the chapel is decorated with baroque frescos.

== Kleincomburg ==
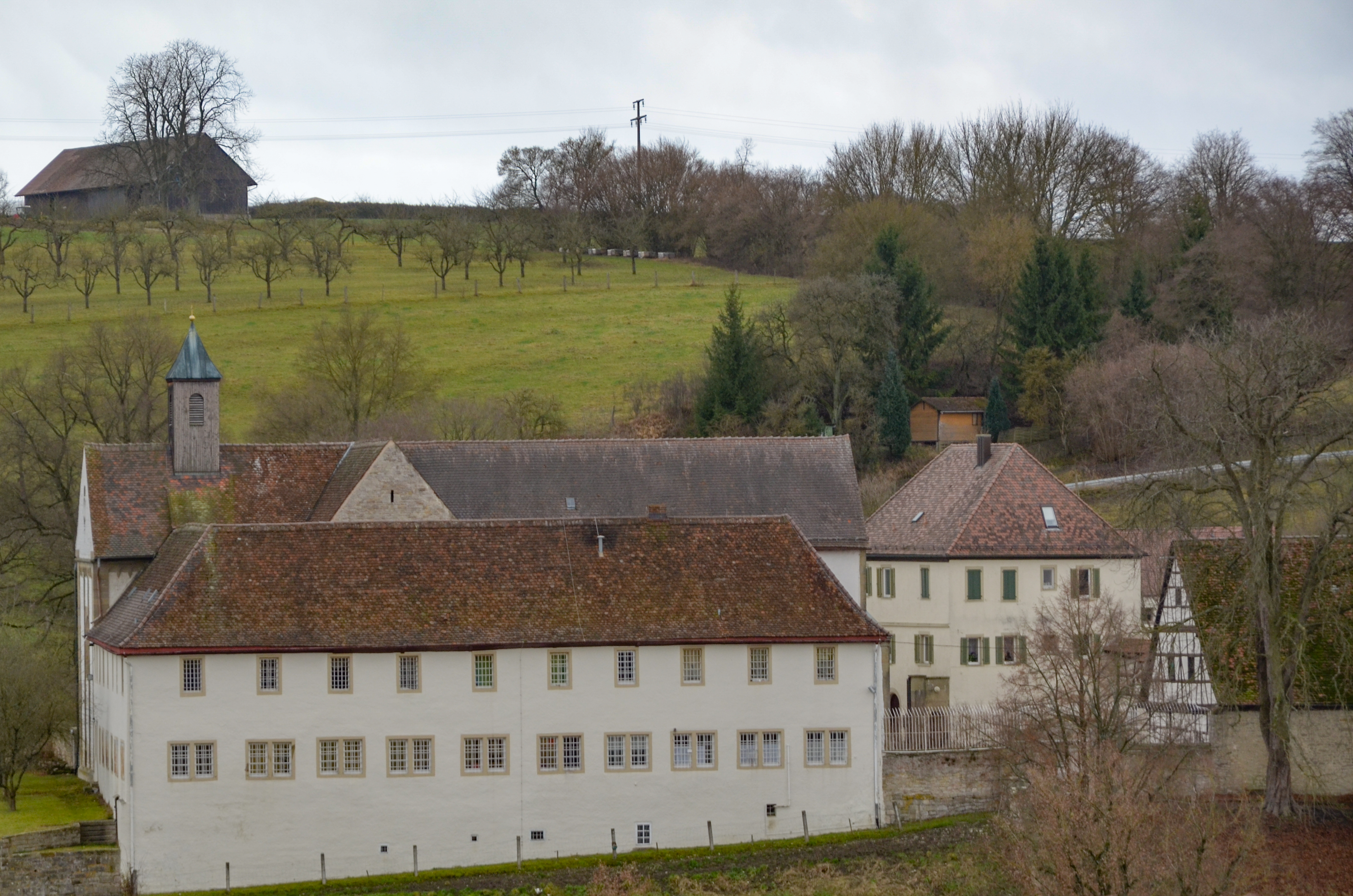
The Kleincomburg

A mere 400 meters south of the Comburg, on a smaller hill, lies the former convent of Kleincomburg. The early history of this place is very poorly documented. Georg Widman, a chronicler from Hall, asserts that the convent was founded in 1108 by Count Heinrich of Rothenburg-Comburg, the brother of Burkhardt II, as a counterpart to the men's monastery of Grosscomburg. However, some of Widman's claims regarding the convent are demonstrably false, leaving this assertion of dubious value. The earliest actual reference to the abbey is a 1291 deed of Grosscomburg. This document mentions a Provost, a Magistra, and Nuns at Kleincomburg being entitled to a share of the Schwäbisch Hall salt works, separate from Grosscomburg's share. Since a 1306 list of share owners of the salt works fails to mention the convent, it probably ceased to exist before that date. Continuities between the alleged 1108 convent and 1291 convent are not to be found, neither are structural remains of confirmed convent structures. The still-extant church on the site, a representative example of Romanesque architecture, dates to ca. 1100. However, the lack of a nun's gallery and the Basilica form of the church are both uncommon for convents of the time. According to a hypothesis of historian Eberhard Hause, Kleincomburg was originally built as a widow's seat for a member of the Rothenburg-Comburg family.

Eventually, the site was transformed into a priory attached to Grosscomburg. This was, in turn, deeded to the Capuchin Order, which utilized the site as a hospital and monastery until it was transferred to state ownership in 1802. Save for an interlude from 1849 to 1872 where the monastic community was reestablished by the Franciscans, the Kleincomburg was retained by the state, mostly for use as a correctional facility, until 2015. Currently, the church is used by the local Catholic parish, while the future of the site is uncertain.

== Abbots ==
- Gunter 1096
- Hardwig
- Adelbert 1145
- Gernod 1158^{†}
- Engelhard Löw
- Wernherr
- Rüdiger
- Wolframus
- Walther 1213^{†}
- Conrad von Entensee
- Heinrich
- Eberhard Philipp von Eltershofen 1213
- Embricus
- Heinrich von Schefflai 1241
- Berchtoldus von Michelfeld
- Sifrid von Morstein 1260
- Heinrich von Presingen
- Burkhardt/Beringer Senft
- Conrad von Ahaussen 1273
- Wolframus von Pühlerriet
- Conrad von Münken 1324
- Heinrich Sieder 1370^{†}
- Rudolph von Gundelshofen 1377^{†}
- Erkhinger Feldner 1401^{†}
- Ehrenfried I von Bellberg 1418^{†}
- Gottfried von Stetten 1451^{†}
- Ehrenfried II von Bellberg 1476^{†}
- Andreas von Triefshausen
- Hiltebrand von Crailsheim
- December 5th, 1488 converted to Ritterstift
