= February 1912 =

Month of 1912

| << | February 1912 | | | | | >> |
| Su | Mo | Tu | We | Th | Fr | Sa |
| | | | | 1 | 2 | 3 |
| 4 | 5 | 6 | 7 | 8 | 9 | 10 |
| 11 | 12 | 13 | 14 | 15 | 16 | 17 |
| 18 | 19 | 20 | 21 | 22 | 23 | 24 |
| 25 | 26 | 27 | 28 | 29 |

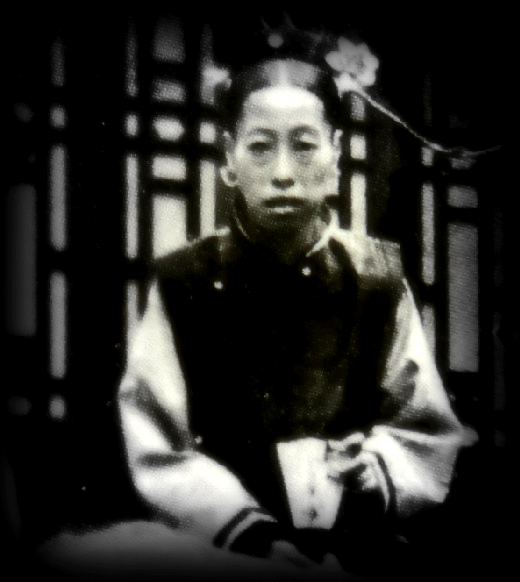
February 12, 1912: Regent Empress Dowager Longyu abdicates on behalf of her ward, Emperor Puyi, bringing end to the Qing Dynasty

February 14, 1912: Arizona admitted as 48th state of the U.S.

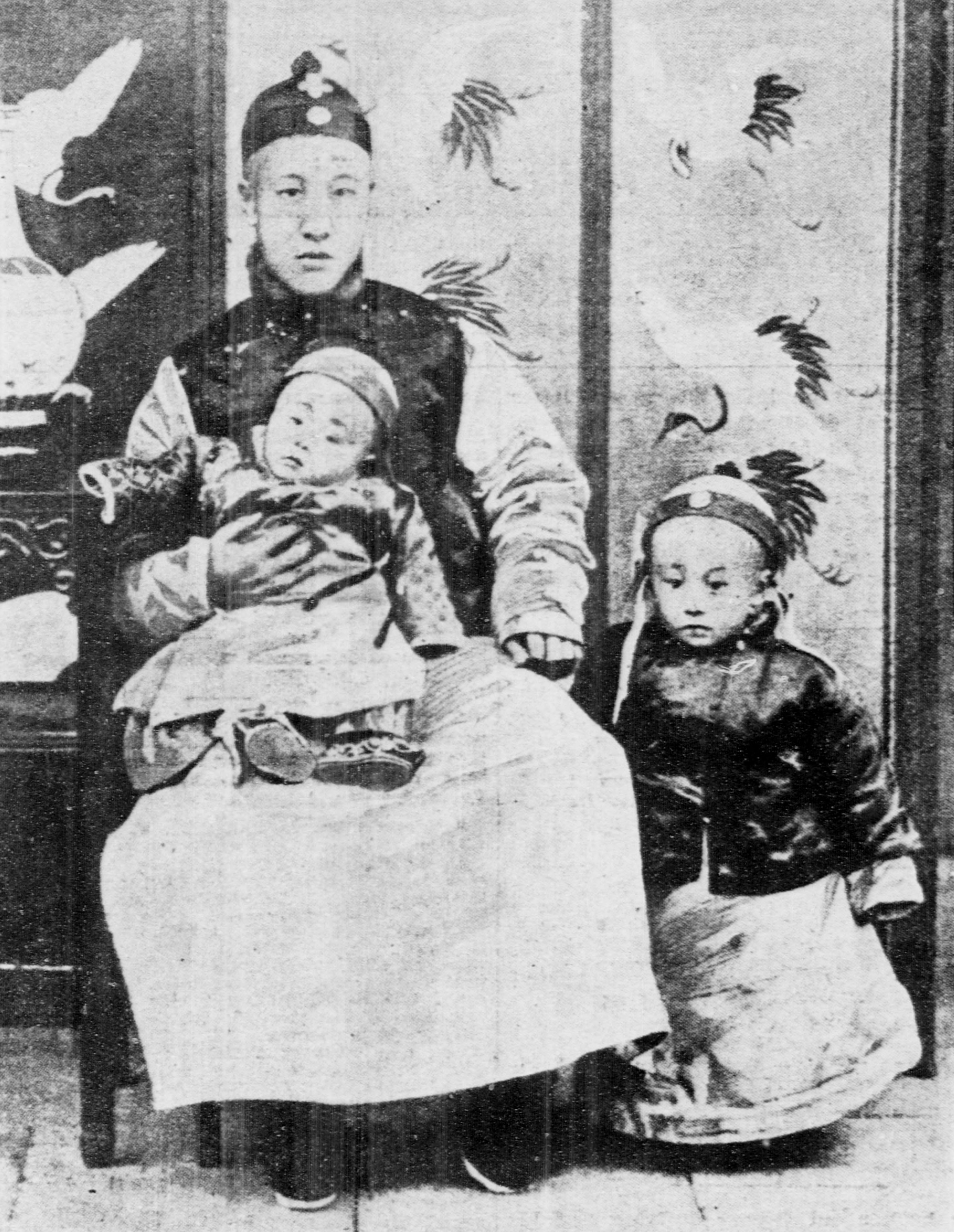
February 12, 1912: Emperor Puyi (standing) abdicates from the throne, bringing end to Qing dynasty

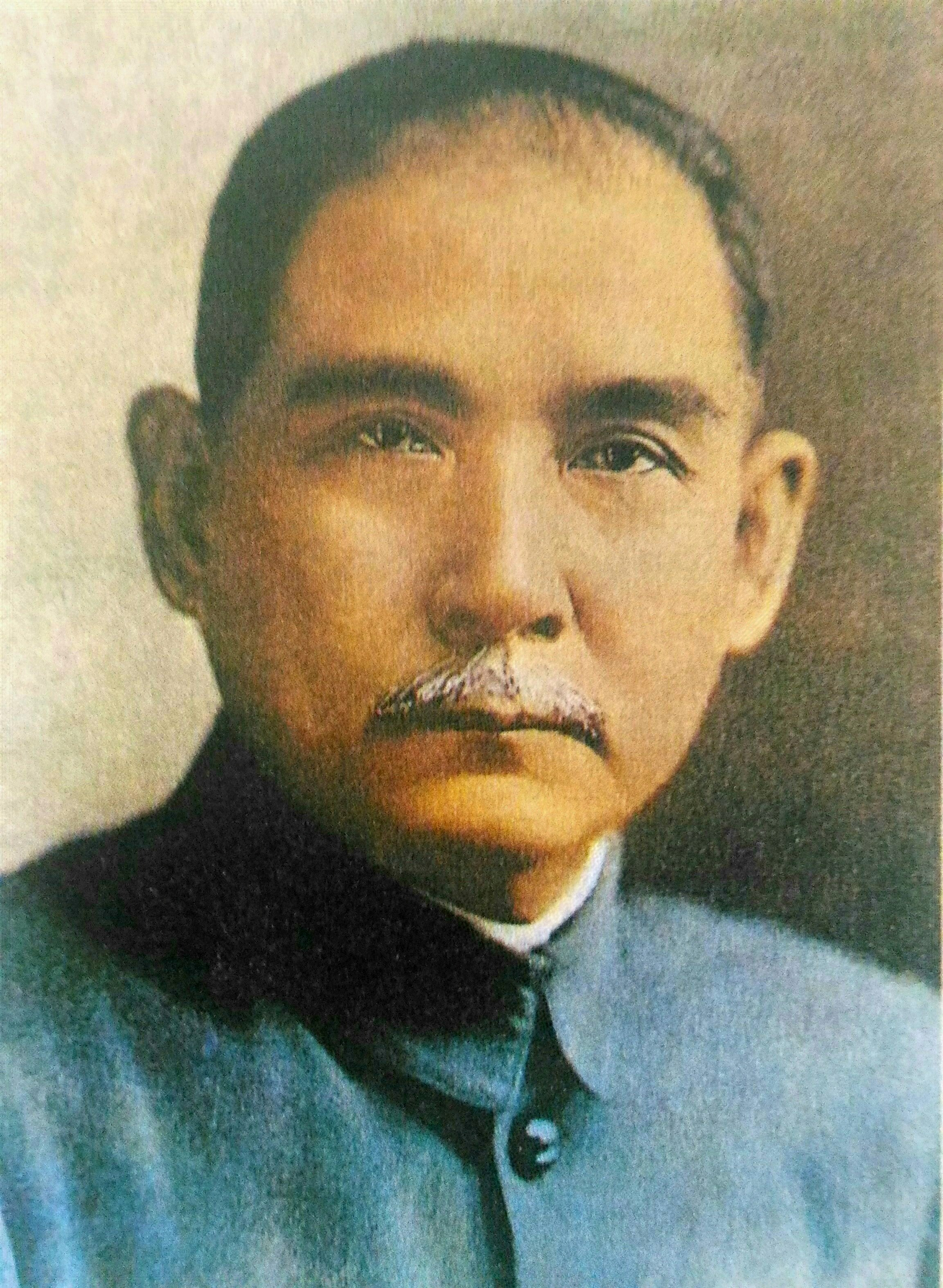
February 13, 1912: Sun Yat-sen resigns as President of the rest of China as monarchy ends

The following events occurred in February 1912:

== February 1, 1912 (Thursday) ==
- General Manuel Bonilla, elected on November 3, 1911, was sworn in as President of Honduras.
- After four years of existence, the city of Strathcona, Alberta was incorporated into Edmonton. The merger had been approved by a 518–178 margin of Strathcona voters.
- The Stamford Brook station opened to serve District Railway and London and South Western Railway trains, eventually becoming part of the London Underground.
- A two-seat biplane prototype was test flown by aviator Geoffrey de Havilland at the Royal Aircraft Factory, Farnborough Airport, Hampshire, England.
- Died: Jimmy Doyle, 30, American baseball player, third baseman for the Cincinnati Reds and Chicago Cubs, leader in the National League for double plays and in errors, died of blood poisoning following an appendectomy (b. 1881).

== February 2, 1912 (Friday) ==
- The Royal Navy submarine HMS A3, with 14 men aboard, sank off of the Isle of Wight after being rammed by the depot ship Hazard.
- The German cargo ship SS Augsburg departed from New York City toward its destination of Durban in South Africa, with a crew of 39 people and a cargo of cans of kerosene to be delivered to Bataiva in the Dutch East Indies (now Jakarta in Indonesia). Expected to arrive at Durban by March 5, the ship disappeared without a trace. The captain of another German ship, SS Magdeburg, which departed the same day, had passed through a severe storm on February 4 and speculated that SS Augsburg had sunk at that time.
- A general strike in Brisbane involving tramway workers turned violent when police officers and special constables attacked a crowd of 15,000 demonstrators assembling in the city's Market Square in what became known as "Baton Friday" and later, "Black Friday." Many of demonstrators were women, including hundreds of elderly. One of the elderly group reportedly stood her ground against a mounted police officer, stabbing the horse in the side with a hairpin that caused the horse to buck the officer off.
- The Union Party retained their majority in general elections held on the Faroe Islands.

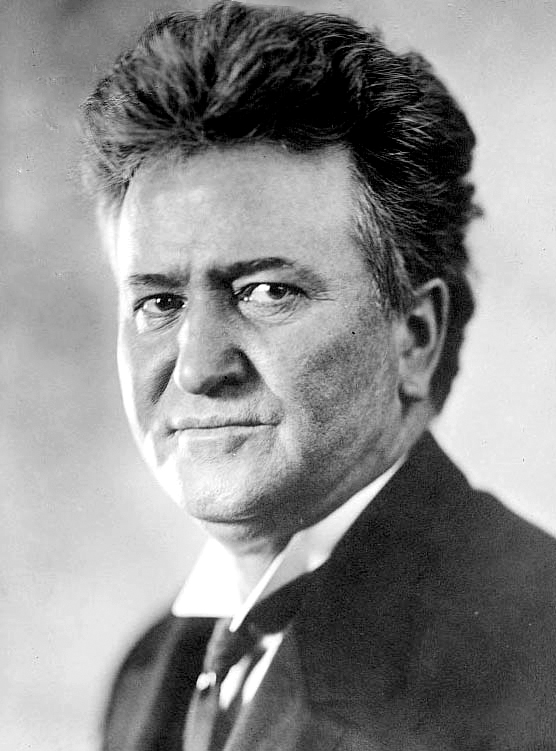
Senator La Follette

- U.S. Senator Robert M. La Follette had been the foremost challenger against incumbent U.S. President William Howard Taft for the Republican Party nomination, until he went ahead with a speech to the Periodical Publishers' Association, despite being ill with a stomach virus. Instead of making the planned brief remarks, La Follette made a long, rambling speech that criticized the assembled newspaper reporters, then dropped out of sight. La Follette's disastrous showing cleared the way for former President Theodore Roosevelt to get the nomination instead.
- The Central Intercollegiate Athletic Association was organized as the first intercollegiate sports conference for African-American colleges. The original members of the conference were Hampton University, Howard University, Lincoln University, Shaw University, and Virginia Union University.
- Filmmaker Charles Urban released With Our King and Queen Through India, a 2½-hour Kinemacolor feature film of the Delhi Durbar attended by King George in December of 1911, at the Scala Theatre, London.
- Born:
  - Millvina Dean, British public servant, youngest and last survivor of the sinking of the Titanic; in Branscombe, Devonshire (d. 2009).
  - Burton Lane, American composer, known for musical hits including Finian's Rainbow and On a Clear Day You Can See Forever; in New York City (d. 1997).
  - Zhu Shenghao, Chinese academic, translated the works of William Shakespeare into the Chinese language; in Jiaxing, Zhejiang province (d. 1944).

== February 3, 1912 (Saturday) ==
- The French government decreed that the indigenes of Algeria, male residents of Arab descent, were to be drafted for three years service into the French Army. The move was opposed by French Algerians, who did not want the indigenous population to be trained to use weapons, and non-French Algerians.
- The rules of American football were revised by the National Collegiate Athletic Association following two days of deliberations. Among the alterations were that the length of the field was shortened from 110 yards to 100, teams would now have four downs instead of three to try to gain ten yards, kickoffs were to be made from the 40 yard line rather than the middle of the field, and the touchdown was now worth six points instead of five.
- Born:
  - Lynn Patrick, Canadian hockey player, left wing for the New York Rangers from 1934 to 1947; in Victoria, British Columbia (d. 1980).
  - Jacques Soustelle, French anthropologist, leading researcher on Pre-Columbian civilizations; in Montpellier, Hérault département (d. 1990).

== February 4, 1912 (Sunday) ==
- Bohemia won the Ice Hockey European Championship in Prague.

February 4, 1912: Film captured Reichelt's jump and fall, his body being removed, and measurement of the hollow created by the impact.

- Parisian tailor and inventor Franz Reichelt plunged to his death after jumping from the Eiffel Tower to test a wearable parachute.
- King George and Queen Mary arrived back in the United Kingdom at Spithead, England, after an absence of almost three months. The royal family had departed on November 10, 1911, to travel to British India.
- An ice bridge over Niagara Falls broke and carried an Ohio teenager and a Canadian husband and wife to their deaths over the falls, as thousands of spectators watched in horror. The 1,000-foot-wide (300 m) bridge had formed two weeks earlier from the piling up of ice fields from up river, and was 60 feet (18 m) thick. An article in The New York Times remarked: "This is the first time in the history of the Niagara that lives have been lost in this way."
- U.S. President William Howard Taft ordered an increase of the number of American troops guarding the nation's border with Mexico.
- Born:
  - Erich Leinsdorf, Austrian-American conductor, known for his collaborations with Boston Symphony Orchestra, Metropolitan Opera, Los Angeles Philharmonic, and New York Philharmonic; in Vienna (d. 1993).
  - Byron Nelson, American golfer, winner of the 1937 British Open, the 1937 and 1942 Masters, the 1939 U.S. Open, and the 1940 and 1945 PGA Championships, and sixth all-time winner of the PGA Tour with 52 wins; in Waxahachie, Texas (d. 2006).

== February 5, 1912 (Monday) ==
- The Mormon colonies in Mexico, which had been founded by Americans more than 25 years earlier, were threatened for the first time when the residents of Colonia Juárez refused a demand by a force of Mexican rebels for weapons, horses and supplies. Initially, the colonists were able to resist a takeover by pledging to remain neutral and by requesting intervention by the American consul.
- The British Arbitration League, a peace society, issued an appeal against air warfare, with signatories including renowned British authors Arthur Conan Doyle and Thomas Hardy, and American painter John Singer Sargent.
- The first exhibition of Futurist painting was held, opening in Paris.
- Thornton Burgess published the first installment of his syndicated newspaper column "Bedtime Stories," which ran six days a week. He wrote 15,000 of the columns, along with 100 books, retiring in 1960 at the age of 86.
- Sidney Smith's cartoon Old Doc Yak made its debut in the Chicago Tribune.
- Born: Hedwig Potthast, German administrator, secretary and mistress to Heinrich Himmler; in Cologne (d. 1994).
- Died: Mary Greenleaf Clement Leavitt, 81, American activist against alcohol sales, leading promoter of the Woman's Christian Temperance Union (b. 1830).

== February 6, 1912 (Tuesday) ==
- Portuguese army reinforcements began arriving in Dili, East Timor to help put down a revolt in the interior.
- The colonial administration of German Samoa abolished the chieftain position of Ali'i Sili (paramount chief) following the death of Mataʻafa Iosefo. Samoans Tanumafili I and Tamasese Meaole I were appointed fautua, or advisers to the colonial administration, in place of the position.
- The city of Mt. Lebanon, Pennsylvania was created and incorporated as a township.
- Born:
  - Eva Braun, German photographer, companion and wife of Adolf Hitler; in Munich (committed suicide, 1945).
  - Christopher Hill, English historian, leading expert on early modern Britain, in York (d. 2003).
- Died: James B. Weaver, 68, American politician, U.S. Representative for Iowa as member of the Greenback Party from 1879 to 1889, 1892 presidential candidate for the Populist Party (b. 1833).

== February 7, 1912 (Wednesday) ==
- One day after announcing that federal appellate judge William Cather Hook would be his nominee to fill the vacancy on the U.S. Supreme Court caused by the death of John Marshall Harlan, U.S. President William Howard Taft withdrew Hook's name because of protests by the NAACP and other African-American organizations. Mahlon Pitney was selected by the President in place of Hook.
- The U.S. Marines landed at Puerto Cortés in Honduras.
- The Usambara Railway officially opened for operation in German East Africa (now Tanzania).
- A rail line of 4 miles 7 chains (6.6 kilometres) in length opened between Jammerdrif to Wepener, South Africa.
- Born:
  - Russell Drysdale, British-Australian artist, known for paintings including Sofala and West Wyalong; in Bognor Regis, West Sussex (d. 1981).
  - Roberta McCain, American socialite and oil heiress (d. 2020).
  - Roy Sullivan, American park ranger, recorded by Guinness World Records for being struck the most times by lightning; in Greene County, Virginia (committed suicide, 1983).
- Died: Edward Wilmot Blyden, 79, Liberian politician and activist, proponent of Pan-Africanism (b. 1832).

== February 8, 1912 (Thursday) ==
- Robert G. Fowler landed his airplane in Jacksonville, Florida after starting from Los Angeles on October 19, becoming the first pilot to fly across the United States from west to east (California to Florida), and the second overall, after Cal Rodgers.
- Emmanouel Argyoropoulos became the first Greek pilot, taking a Nieuport airplane aloft at Athens. On his second flight of the day, he was accompanied by Greek Prime Minister Eleftherios Venizelos as his co-pilot.
- Australia inaugurated its first wireless telegraphic station, at Melbourne, as part of a plan to establish a network of 19 stations nationwide.

== February 9, 1912 (Friday) ==
- Japan began shipment of 6,040 cherry blossom seedlings to the United States. The shipment arrived in Washington, D.C. the following month.
- An eight-year old Tunisian Arab child was struck and killed by a tram operating by an Italian operator in Tunis. Witnesses to the tragic accident reported the operator being drunk while operating the vehicle. A boycott was called on all Italian-owned trams in Tunis until reparations were paid to the family of the deceased child. The boycott would last nearly two months with none of the protestors' demands met, but it laid the groundwork for the Tunisian national movement.
- Born:
  - Thomas Hinman Moorer, American naval officer, Chief of Naval Operations during the Vietnam War; in Mount Willing, Alabama (d. 2004).
  - Futabayama Sadaji, Japanese sumo wrestler, 35th yokozuna; in Usa, Ōita Prefecture (d. 1968).
- Died: Hyacinthe Loyson, 84, French cleric who was excommunicated by the Catholic Church after questioning the doctrine of papal infallibility (b. 1827).

== February 10, 1912 (Saturday) ==
- The French Senate ratified the Morocco agreement.
- The Sáenz Peña Law (named after Argentine President Roque Sáenz Peña) was put into effect, allowing universal suffrage for all male citizens in Argentina. Women's suffrage would not be achieved in the country until 1947.
- Archibald Peake of the Liberal Union Party defeated incumbent John Verran of the United Labor Party in the state election for South Australia.
- Seven state governors sent former U.S. President Theodore Roosevelt a letter urging him to declare that he would accept the Republican nomination for the presidency. Roosevelt would answer on February 24.
- Born: Henry Krips, Austrian-Australian composer, known for his collaboration with the Adelaide Symphony Orchestra; in Vienna (d. 1987).
- Died:
  - Joseph Lister, 84, British surgeon, introduced the practice of sterilization of wounds and surgical instruments (b. 1827).
  - José Paranhos, 67, Brazilian diplomat, Minister of Foreign Affairs from 1902 to 1912 (b. 1845).
  - Thomas Reibey, Australian politician, Premier of Tasmania 1876 to 1877 (b. 1821).

== February 11, 1912 (Sunday) ==
- The Niger-Chad border was created by French military commanders and the Governors-General of French West Africa and French Equatorial Africa.
- Agustín Lizárraga, who discovered Machu Picchu in 1902 before American explorer Hiram Bingham in 1911, was reported drowned after falling off of a bridge in Peru.
- The Shinano Railway Line was extended in Chikuma, Nagano, Japan, with Togura Station serving the line.
- Swedish figure skater Gösta Sandahl won the gold medal in the European Figure Skating Championships in Stockholm.
- Born: Roy Fuller, English writer, member of The Movement in the United Kingdom, father to poet John Fuller; in Failsworth, Lancashire (d. 1991).

== February 12, 1912 (Monday) ==
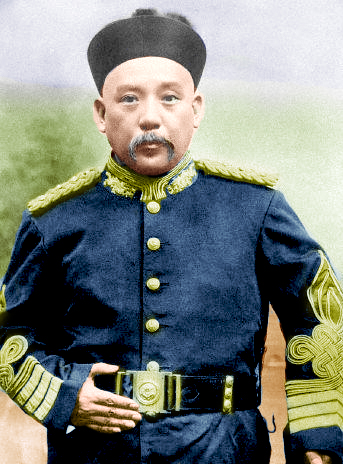
New President Yuan Shih-kai

- The Qing dynasty of China, also called the Manchu dynasty, came to an end after 268 years as the Empress Dowager Longyu signed an agreement on behalf of Puyi, the six year old Emperor of China, to dissolve the Imperial Advisory Council and making General Yuan Shikai the president of the new Republic. In return for the peaceful transition, the Republicans signed the "Articles of Favorable Treatment." The Emperor was allowed to keep his title, palace and servants, and to continue to live the Imperial life. The arrangement lasted until 1924, when Feng Yuxiang forced the Imperial family to flee from the Forbidden City to the Japanese Embassy.
- China's Foreign Ministry wired its diplomats around the world, directing them to abandon their traditional Chinese clothing in favor of "the usual dress of American civil officials." At home, many Chinese citizens began adopting foreign attire as well.
- Bonar Law began steps to merge the Liberal Unionist Party and the Conservative Party, shaping the British conservative party into its present form.
- Dutch aviator Anthony Fokker established Fokker Aeroplanbau in Germany, predecessor to Fokker Aircraft Company.
- The Oregon Eastern Railway was sold to the Central Pacific Railroad in Oregon.
- The Vancouver Sun published its first issue.
- Born:
  - Anton Buttigieg, President of Malta from 1976 to 1981; in Qala, Malta (d. 1983).
  - Edith Houghton, the first female Major League Baseball scout; in North Philadelphia, Pennsylvania. Houghton worked for the Philadelphia Phillies from 1946 to 1952 (d. 2013).

== February 13, 1912 (Tuesday) ==
- Bulgaria and Serbia signed an agreement, forming the Balkan League.
- The stern of the battleship USS Maine was raised from Havana Harbor, where it had exploded and sunk on February 15, 1898. After the stern was refloated, the ship's hulk was, on March 16, towed to the Straits of Florida, and following a ceremony, sunk in 620 fathoms of water within American territorial limits.
- Dr. Sun Yat-sen informed the National Assembly at Nanjing of his resignation as President of China, and asked the legislators to elect Yuan Shikai. Yuan was sworn in as president in Beijing on March 10, 1912.
- Born:
  - Antonia Pozzi, Italian poet, known for poetry collections including Breath. Poems and Letters; in Milan (d. 1938).
  - Margaretta Scott, English actor, best known for her role in the BBC television sitcom All Creatures Great and Small; in Westminster, London (d. 2005).

== February 14, 1912 (Wednesday) ==
- Arizona was admitted as the 48th state of the United States, at 10:00 am ET (8:00 am MT in Arizona), as U.S. President William Howard Taft signed a proclamation of statehood. At noon, George W. P. Hunt was inaugurated as the first State Governor.
- King George gave a speech in the British Parliament about his visit to the imperial colonies and expressed his trust to the people of India and their government when he visited the country in 1911.
- Amateur archaeologist Charles Dawson wrote a letter to British paleontologist Arthur Smith Woodward, describing his finding of "part of a thick human skull" in "a very old Pleistocene bed" between Uckfield and Crowborough in East Sussex, England. Dawson's "discovery," known as the "Piltdown Man," became one of the great hoaxes of the 20th century.
- The Times of London announced that Captain W.S. Patton, a British physician in Madras, had discovered the parasite that caused black fever.
- Born:
  - Juan Pujol García, Spanish spy, double agent for MI5 who infiltrated Nazi Germany's intelligence organization Abwehr during World War II, where he diverted attention away from the Normandy landings using false information, recipient of the Order of the British Empire and the Iron Cross; in Barcelona (d. 1988).
  - Ollie Harrington, American cartoonist, known for his political cartoon collections including Dark Laughter; in Valhalla, New York (d. 1995).
  - Nie Er, Chinese composer, best known for the "March of the Volunteers," the national anthem of China; in Kunming, Yunnan province (d. drowned 1935).

== February 15, 1912 (Thursday) ==
- Yuan Shikai, who had been leader of North China from Beijing, was declared as President of the Republic of China by the assembly that controlled South China from Nanjing, at the recommendation of President Sun Yat-sen. Sun "had committed himself to put the unity of China before his own position and, had he not done so, the consequence would almost certainly have been civil war."
- Some 40,000-hectare (400 km^{2}; 150 sq mi) of Zululand in South Africa was set aside as wildlife game reserve.
- Born: George Mikes, Hungarian-born British journalist, known for his humorous collection including How to be an Alien; in Siklós (d. 1987).

== February 16, 1912 (Friday) ==
- Residents of La Mesa Springs voted 249–60 to incorporate the city of La Mesa, California. Now a suburb of San Diego, the city's population grew from 700 to over 57,000 people in a hundred years.
- The Mexican town of Garza Galán, in Coahuila State and across the Rio Grande from Del Rio, Texas, was renamed in honor of poet Manuel Acuña. The name was shortened to Villa Manuel Acuña to Ciudad Acuña on September 16, 1957.
- Thomas Jennings, the first American criminal to be convicted by fingerprint evidence, was executed by hanging.
- Died: Nicholas of Japan, 75, Russian Orthodox missionary and saint who introduced the Eastern Orthodox Church to Japan (b. 1836).

== February 17, 1912 (Saturday) ==
- British polar explorer Edgar Evans, 35, became the first of the five members of Robert Falcon Scott's South Pole group to perish during the group's attempt to return to their base. Evans collapsed the previous day as the party descended Beardmore Glacier in Antarctica, likely due to combination of frostbite, exhaustion, and complications from injuries to his hand and head during the return trek. The group was forced to leave his body behind and it was never recovered.
- A plot against Count Hisaichi Terauchi, the first Governor-General of Korea, was discovered.
- Robert G. Fowler landed his airplane at Pablo Beach, Florida, becoming the second person to fly an airplane across the United States, and the first to travel from west to east. He had started from Pasadena, California on October 20, after Cal Rodgers had flown east to west in 1911.
- British pilot Graham Gilmour was killed when the Martin airplane he was flying over Richmond Park, London experienced structural failure in mid-air and crashed.
- The Baltimore and Ohio Railroad, commonly called the "B&O", reversed a decision to have separate waiting rooms for black and white passengers at its stations. On January 25, the managing editor of the Baltimore Afro-American, John H. Murphy Sr., had written to B&O President Daniel Willard and pledged to use his influence to divert the black tourist and convention business to other railroad lines.
- Austrian figure skater Fritz Kachler won the gold at the Men's World Figure Skating Championships in Manchester.
- Born: Andre Norton (pen name for Alice Mary Norton), American science fiction and fantasy writer, author of the Witch World series, and the first woman to be inducted in the Science Fiction and Fantasy Hall of Fame; in Cleveland (d. 2005).
- Died:
  - George Fuller Golden, 43, American vaudeville entertainer and labor leader, founder of the White Rats of America labor union, died of tuberculosis (b. 1868).
  - John Hyde, 46, American Presbyterian missionary, known his missionary work in British India's Punjab Province, died following surgery for a brain tumor (b. 1865).
  - Alois Lexa von Aehrenthal, 57, Austrian diplomat, Foreign Minister of Austria-Hungary from 1906 to 1912, died of leukemia (b. 1854).

== February 18, 1912 (Sunday) ==
- The 13th Dalai Lama, Thakpo Langdun, declared Tibet independent of the Republic of China. The Buddhist kingdom would resist several invasions until being conquered by the People's Republic of China in 1959.
- Under pressure from Russia and the United Kingdom, the government of Persia restored a pension to its former King, Mohammad Ali Shah Qajar, and granted amnesty to the followers who had attempted to return him to the throne.
- British full-rigged ship Erne was abandoned during a storm in the Atlantic Ocean while en route from Boston to Buenos Aires, with the loss of 10 out 19 crew.
- Norwegian speed skater Oscar Mathisen won his third world title at the World Allround Speed Skating Championships in Kristiania, Norway.

== February 19, 1912 (Monday) ==
- Fifty people drowned in the sinking of a boat at Rangoon.
- Carl Hayden was sworn in as the first U.S. Representative for the newly admitted state of Arizona. In 1927, he became one of the state's U.S. Senators, and became the first person to serve fifty years in the U.S. Congress, serving until 1969.
- Mahlon Pitney was nominated by U.S. President William Howard Taft to become a justice of the U.S. Supreme Court. He would be confirmed by the Senate on March 14, 1912, by a vote of 50–26.
- For the first time, a small prize was placed in every box of Cracker Jack, the caramel, popcorn and peanuts snack introduced in 1896.
- Born:
  - Hermann Flohn, German climatologist who was one of the first scientists to research climate change; in Frankfurt (d. 1997).
  - Adolf Rudnicki, Polish Jewish writer, best known for his novels on The Holocaust and Warsaw Uprising; in Żabno (d. 1990).

== February 20, 1912 (Tuesday) ==
- A cyclone swept through Louisiana and Mississippi, killing 20 people, mostly African-Americans. The heaviest damage was in Shreveport, Louisiana, where eight people died.
- Jens Bratlie became the fifth Prime Minister of Norway, replacing Wollert Konow and his cabinet.
- Count Leopold Berchtold replaced the late Count Alois Lexa von Aehrenthal as the Foreign Minister of Austria-Hungary.
- Born:
  - Pierre Boulle, French novelist, author of The Bridge over the River Kwai and Planet of the Apes; in Avignon, Vaucluse département (d. 1994).
  - Muriel Humphrey, American politician, U.S. Senator for Minnesota following the death of her husband Hubert Humphrey in 1978; in Huron, South Dakota (d. 1998).
  - George Devol, American inventor who developed the first industrial robot; in Louisville, Kentucky (d. 2011).

== February 21, 1912 (Wednesday) ==
- The city of Houston was heavily damaged by a fire that destroyed 19 businesses and destroyed 200 buildings in the downtown. There were no deaths, but 1,000 people were left homeless. The blaze, which started in an empty rooming house, was spread by a gale across the Texas city.
- Construction workers successfully bored a nearly six mile tunnel through the Swiss Alps to make possible the Jungfrau Railway. The tunnel was made beneath the Eiger and Mönch mountains, both more than 13,000 feet tall. The line, at the time the highest in Europe, would open on August 1, 1912.
- Captain Fesa Bey became the first member of the Turkish Army to complete flight training and to be awarded a pilot's license.
- The Palmyra Atoll was successfully claimed as a possession of the United States by the USS West Virginia, under the command of Rear Admiral W. H. H. Southerland.
- Born: Solomon Schonfeld, British rabbi who rescued thousands of European Jews from The Holocaust; in Stoke Newington, London (d. 1984).
- Died: Osborne Reynolds, 69, Irish chemist and physicist and pioneer in the study of fluid dynamics (b. 1842).

== February 22, 1912 (Thursday) ==
- A fire at the No. 5 mine of Western Coal Company in Lehigh, Oklahoma, killed nine people. Rufino Rodrigues saved as many as 259 miners by venturing further into the mine to warn his fellow employees. Rodrigues, a 22-year-old native of Mexico, was awarded a bronze medal by the Carnegie Hero Fund.
- French pilot Jules Védrines became the first airplane pilot to fly faster than 100 miles per hour.
- In Vernon, California, Johnny Kilbane defeated champion Abe Attell for the world featherweight boxing championship. Attell had held the title for 11 years, and Kilbane would hold it for 11 more.

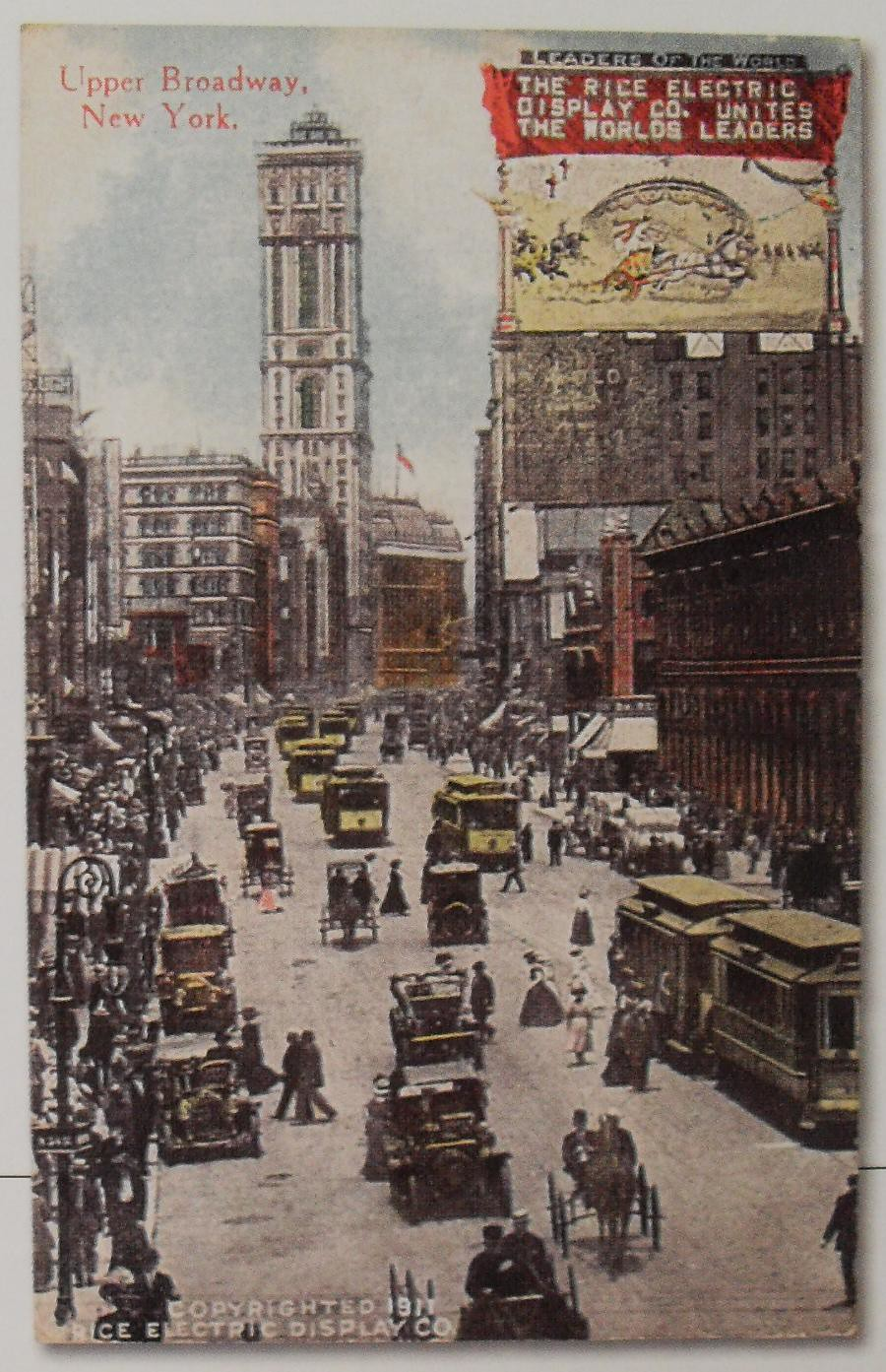
The "Leaders of the World" sign before its destruction

- The illuminated Leaders of the World electric sign in New York City was destroyed by a record-breaking storm. The sign The sign had been in operation on July 19, 1910 and was on the roof of the Hotel Normandie, at Broadway and 38th Street, near Herald Square, taking approximately 90 days to complete. With 20,000 electric light bulbs and 70,000 electrical connections, the sign displayed messages and an animated scene of a chariot race.
- Born:
  - Harold Keith Johnson, American army officer, Chief of Staff of the United States Army during the height of Vietnam War; in Bowesmont, North Dakota (d. 1983).
  - Henry S. Reuss, American politician, U.S. Representative of Wisconsin from 1955 to 1983; in Milwaukee (d. 2002).

== February 23, 1912 (Friday) ==
- The Italian Chamber of Deputies voted 431–38 in favor of approving the royal proclamation to annex Tripolitania and Cyrenaica, both part of modern-day Libya. The Italian Senate approved the measure unanimously the next day.

== February 24, 1912 (Saturday) ==
- In an attempt to force the Ottoman Empire to accept the annexation of Tripoli and Cyrenaica, Italy made a surprise attack on Beirut, a part of the Empire. The cruiser Giuseppe Garibaldi and the gunboat Volturno sailed into the Lebanese port and demanded the surrender of the Turkish ships Ankara and Avnillah. Before the Ottoman provincial governor could reply, the Italian ships began bombardment, sinking both ships. The final death toll was 97 sailors and civilians.
- Former U.S. President Theodore Roosevelt replied to the February 10 letter from several state governors, and declared that he would be willing to accept the Republican party nomination for President "if it is tendered to me," and added that "I will adhere to this decision until the convention has expressed its preference." The letter was released the next day.
- One of the first photographic aerial reconnaissance missions was undertaken, with Italian Army Captain Carlo Piazza photographing Ottoman Army positions in Libya during the Italo-Turkish War.
- The steamship Earnslaw was launched at Kingston on Lake Wakatipu in New Zealand.

== February 25, 1912 (Sunday) ==
- The first Boy Scout troop in China was organized, by the Reverend Yen Chia-lin, in the city of Wuchang. The organization, now called the Scouts of China, is limited to Taiwan.
- Grand Duke William of Luxembourg died while still on throne at age 59. He was succeeded by his 17-year-old daughter, Marie-Adélaïde, who reigned over the European nation as Grand Duchess until 1919 when she abdicated the throne to her sister Charlotte.
- Born: Al Tomaini, American circus performer billed as "The Tallest Man in the World," standing 8'4" in 1931; in Long Branch, New Jersey. He and his wife, 2'6" Jeanie Tomiani, were later billed as "The World's Strangest Married Couple" (d. 1962).

== February 26, 1912 (Monday) ==
- Coal miners in the United Kingdom walked out on strike, beginning with employees of the Alfretor coal pits in Derbyshire, England. By Thursday, 600,000 miners had stopped work. The walkout lasted for seven weeks. By the end of the week, one million miners joined the strike, seeking a minimum wage guarantee.
- After announcing that he would run against U.S. President William Howard Taft for the 1912 Republican nomination, former President Theodore Roosevelt was asked at a press conference in Boston whether he intended "to support the Republican nominee, whoever he may be" and replied that he would. After Taft received the nomination, Roosevelt ran against him as candidate of the Progressive Party.
- Born: Hugues Panassié, French jazz producer, founder of Hot Club de France; in Paris (d. 1974).
- Died: Bernardino Caballero, 72, President of Paraguay 1880 to 1886 (b. 1839).

== February 27, 1912 (Tuesday) ==
- Eladio Victoria was sworn in as President of the Dominican Republic after his nephew, General Alfredo Victoria, pressured the Dominican Congress to elect his uncle. As a result, Horacio Vasquez returned from exile and led his followers, the "Horacistas," in a revolt against the government.
- Liberato Marcial Rojas was forced out of office as President of Paraguay and replaced by Pedro Peña.
- General Electric Company obtained the U.S. Patent 1,018,502 for a tungsten filament lamp that had been invented by Austrian scientists Alexander Just and Franz Hanaman.
- The Pacific Great Eastern Railway, predecessor of BC Rail, was incorporated to build a line from Vancouver north to a connection with the Grand Trunk Pacific Railway at Prince George, British Columbia.
- British skating pair James and Phyllis Johnson won the gold at the Pairs World Figure Skating Championships in Manchester.
- The towns of Grant, Iowa and Pollasky, California were incorporated.
- Born:
  - Lawrence Durrell, British writer, author of The Alexandria Quartet and The Avignon Quintet; in Jalandhar, Punjab Province, British India (d. 1990).
  - James Klugmann, British writer, historian of the Communist Party of Great Britain; in Hampstead, London (d. 1977).

== February 28, 1912 (Wednesday) ==
- A storm at Lake Tamehua, within the Mexican state of Tamaulipas, caused a barge to overturn, killing 35 people. Many of the drowning victims were American employees of the Pearson Oil Company.
- Danish composer Carl Nielsen conducted the premiere of his Symphony No. 3 and his Violin Concerto with the Royal Danish Orchestra in Copenhagen.
- Hill County, Montana was created from the northern part of Chouteau County. Its county seat is Havre.
- Born:
  - Prince Bertil, Swedish royal family member, third son of King Gustaf and Princess Margaret; in Stockholm (d. 1997).
  - Clara Petacci, Italian photographer, mistress of Italian dictator Benito Mussolini; in Rome (executed 1945).

== February 29, 1912 (Thursday) ==
- Serbia and Bulgaria secretly signed a treaty of alliance for a term of eight years, with each pledging to come to the defense of the other during war. The two nations fought together against the Ottoman Empire later that year during the First Balkan War, then against each other in the Second Balkan War and in World War I.
- Russian gold miners at the Lena Mining Company in Siberia went out on strike, originally in protest about the quality of food sold to them by the company.
- King Vajiravudh of Siam (now Thailand) was overseeing military maneuvers at Nakhon Pathom, when he was informed by his army chief of staff, Prince Chakrabongse, that several junior officers were plotting to overthrow him. 92 men were arrested, with most of them graduating from the military academy in 1909.
- Walter Wagner filed for a patent for the "bayonet and valve closed reservoir system," granted as U.S. Patent No. 1,142,210 but not put into use for water coolers until 80 years later. The invention reduced the possibility of contamination of bottled water during the filling and dispensing process.
