= Third Party Risk =

1954 British film by Daniel Birt

- American poster
- Directed by: Daniel Birt
- Written by: Daniel Birt; Robert Dunbar
- Based on: Third Party Risk by Nicholas Bentley
- Produced by: Michael Carreras; Robert Dunbar
- Starring: Lloyd Bridges; Simone Silva; Finlay Currie; Ferdy Mayne; Peter Dyneley; Jane Asher
- Cinematography: Walter J. Harvey; Len Harris
- Edited by: James Needs
- Music by: Michael Krein
- Production company: Hammer Film Productions
- Distributed by: Exclusive Films; Lippert Pictures (US)
- Release dates: January 1955 (U.S.); 4 April 1955 (UK)
- Running time: 70 minutes (UK); 63 minutes (US)
- Country: United Kingdom
- Language: English

Third Party Risk (released in the US as The Deadly Game) is a 1955 second feature British crime drama film directed by Daniel Birt (who died a few months after the film's completion) and starring Lloyd Bridges, Simone Silva and Finlay Currie. It was written by Daniel Birt and Robert Dunbaris, based on the 1953 novel of the same name by Nicholas Bentley. It was released in the United States by Lippert Pictures under the title The Deadly Game, and later shown on American television under the title Big Deadly Game. J. Elder Wills was art director, Jimmy Sangster was assistant director and Phil Leakey handled makeup. Parts of the film were shot on location in Spain. Filming started on 15 February 1954, and it was trade shown on 22 March 1955 at the Hammer Theatre. Meanwhile the film had already been released in America in January 1955. This was the last Hammer film that Lippert released in the US.

== Plot ==
While holidaying in Spain, Philip Graham by chance runs into an old wartime RAF colleague Tony Roscoe, now a society photographer. The pair spend some time reminiscing, before Tony is urgently called back to England on business. Tony is required to fly home, so Philip offers to drive Tony's car back from Spain at the end of his holiday. Tony asks him to also pick up an envelope he has left in the hotel safe.

After Tony's departure, Phil is attacked in a case of mistaken identity while driving Tony's car. When he reports the attack, a local police inspector and hotel guest Darius both tell him that since his discharge from the RAF, Tony has become embroiled in suspicious and probably criminal activities and has been under surveillance. Phil begins to have romantic feelings towards Darius's niece, Marina.

Back in England, Phil goes to return the car, only to find Tony dead on the floor of his darkroom. Phil becomes the prime suspect and, realising that the key to the case must be the contents of the envelope he has in his possession, sets about investigating on his own account. He quickly becomes drawn into a world of blackmail and industrial espionage, focussed on a stolen medical formula which many people seem to want to get their hands on. Along the way he romances Marina and also falls into the sphere of influence of sultry temptress Mitzi. Developments lead him back to Spain, where he finally manages to crack the mystery.

== Cast ==
- Lloyd Bridges as Philip Graham
- Simone Silva as Mitzi Molnaur
- Finlay Currie as Mr. Darius
- Maureen Swanson as Marina
- Ferdy Mayne as Maxwell Carey
- Peter Dyneley as Tony Roscoe
- George Woodbridge as Inspector Goldfinch
- Russell Waters as the scientist
- Roger Delgado as Detective Gonzales
- Seymour Green as Rope-Soles
- Leslie Wright as Sergeant Ramirez
- Mary Parker as Nancy
- Jane Asher as girl
- Patrick Westwood as porter
- Armand Guinle as hotel manager

== Production ==
The film was produced by Hammer Films at the company's Bray Studios in Berkshire with sets designed by the art director James Elder Wills. It was an early role for Maureen Swanson.

== Critical reception ==
In a contemporary reviewThe Monthly Film Bulletin wrote: "There are disconcerting echoes from what may well have been an interesting book by Nicholas Bentley – an occasional line of dialogue giving a clue to character unrealised, dramatic irony felt at several removes – but unimaginative direction and handling of the Spanish scene and routine performances make this a somewhat dismal production. Lloyd Bridges and Maureen Swanson cope adequately with the leading roles, but Finlay Currie gives a curiously negative performance as Darius. All the ingredients for a good 'B' picture were here, but inexpert treatment has smoothed them down to a flat, moderately-paced thriller."

Kine Weekly wrote: "The cast has talent and the staging is colourful, but neither succeeds in bringing conviction to the cliché-ridden story. It fails to build up suspense or spring a surprise at the fade-out. Very moderate British programmer. ... As for the acting, Lloyd Bridges makes the best of a ticklish assignment as Philip, but Finlay Currie, Maureen Swanson, Ferdy Mayne, and the rest, seldom get a break. Incidentally, the dialogue is not so hot."

In British Sound Films: The Studio Years 1928–1959 David Quinlan rated the film as "average", writing: "Unimaginative thriller lifted by a number of capable performances."

Chibnall and McFarlane in The British 'B' Film wrote: "The film contained an exciting fight in a burning barn, but nothing could transcend a lifeless script and coventional plot."
