= Third Party Risk (novel) =

1953 novel

- First edition
- Author: Nicolas Bentley
- Language: English
- Genre: Crime
- Publisher: Michael Joseph
- Publication date: 1953
- Publication place: United Kingdom
- Media type: Print

Third Party Risk is a 1953 crime novel by the British writer Nicolas Bentley. While holidaying near Marseille author Philip Geiger is rescued from drowning by a fellow guest at the hotel who soon embroils him in a series of events that lead to murder.

== Film adaptation ==
In 1954 it was made into film of the same title directed by Daniel Birt and starring Lloyd Bridges, Simone Silva and Finlay Currie.

== Bibliography ==
- Goble, Alan. The Complete Index to Literary Sources in Film. Walter de Gruyter, 1999.
- Reilly, John M. Twentieth Century Crime & Mystery Writers. Springer, 2015.
