= The Floating Dutchman =

1954 British film by Vernon Sewell

- Directed by: Vernon Sewell
- Written by: Vernon Sewell
- Based on: The Floating Dutchman by Nicolas Bentley
- Produced by: William H. Williams
- Starring: Dermot Walsh; Sydney Tafler; Mary Germaine
- Cinematography: Josef Ambor
- Edited by: Geoffrey Muller
- Music by: Eric Spear
- Production company: Merton Park Studios
- Distributed by: Anglo-Amalgamated Film Distributors
- Release date: 1 February 1954
- Running time: 76 minutes
- Country: United Kingdom
- Language: English

The Floating Dutchman (U.S. TV title: Clue for a Corpse) is a 1954 British second feature crime film directed by Vernon Sewell and starring Dermot Walsh, Sydney Tafler and Mary Germaine. It is based on a 1950 novel The Floating Dutchman by Nicholas Bentley. A Scotland Yard detective goes undercover amongst jewel thieves after a dead Dutchman is found floating in the river.

The title is a pun on the legendary ghost ship, the Flying Dutchman.

== Plot ==
A dead Dutchman is found floating in the Thames. The police know he has been missing for a week and was connected to a notorious London fence.

Philip Reid, a musician, is ejected from a club owned by Mr Skinner for being drunk on the job, and put in a taxi. Mr James who had been talking to Skinner follows him out and joins him in the taxi with his sister Rose, who is a hostess at the club. At his flat he informs Philip that he was flashing a stolen cigarette case in the club.

Back in the club Skinner opens his wall safe and removes the items stolen a week before: but one item, the gold cigarette case, is missing – the item Philip had. He tries to deal with Otto, a Jewish fence, who ultimately offers £1000 for the jewels. Later Mr Skinner gets Philip to give the cigarette case back.

James gradually gains the confidence of Skinner, playing the role of a jewel thief. Skinner's sidekick "Snow" White still doesn't trust him.

It is revealed that Skinner has a contact, Rufo, in a posh restaurant nearby, and Skinner gets told when they are in that restaurant so Skinner can rob them. They get a name and Skinner asks James to help them rob the exclusive apartment. The maid disturbs them and they tie her up. James has informed the police and Skinner is arrested, but Snow White is somewhere in the building. Snow White works out that they were betrayed and goes back to the club. He takes Rose to his flat, where she manages to call James and tells him to hurry there.

Meanwhile Skinner escapes from jail.

When Snow White hears someone coming in he presumes it is James and turns off the light. He throws a knife at the figure entering – but it is Skinner.

== Cast ==
- Dermot Walsh as Alexander James
- Sydney Tafler as Victor Skinner
- Mary Germaine as Rose Reid
- Guy Verney as "Snow" White
- Hugh Morton as Inspector Cathie
- James Raglan as Mr. Wynn
- Nicholas Bentley as Collis
- Arnold Marlé as Otto
- Derek Blomfield as Philip Reid
- Howard Lang as police gaoler

== Production ==
The film was an early product of Merton Park Studios, a British company best known for its Edgar Wallace Mysteries of the 1960s.

== Critical reception ==
The Monthly Film Bulletin wrote: "Routine crime story after the American 'B' picture style, with stereotyped adventures in some none too authentic settings."

In British Sound Films: The Studio Years 1928–1959 David Quinlan rated the film as "average", writing: "Formula thriller."

TV Guide called the film a "below average crime drama."

BFI Screenonline noted the film began, "with an opening sequence that anticipates Hitchcock's Frenzy (1972)."
