= March 1912 =

Month of 1912

<<	March 1912					>>
Su	Mo	Tu	We	Th	Fr	Sa
					1	2
3	4	5	6	7	8	9
10	11	12	13	14	15	16
17	18	19	20	21	22	23
24	25	26	27	28	29	30
31

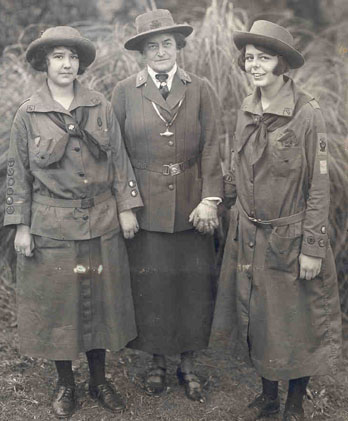
March 12, 1912: Daisy Low founds the Girl Guides of America, now the Girl Scouts of the USA

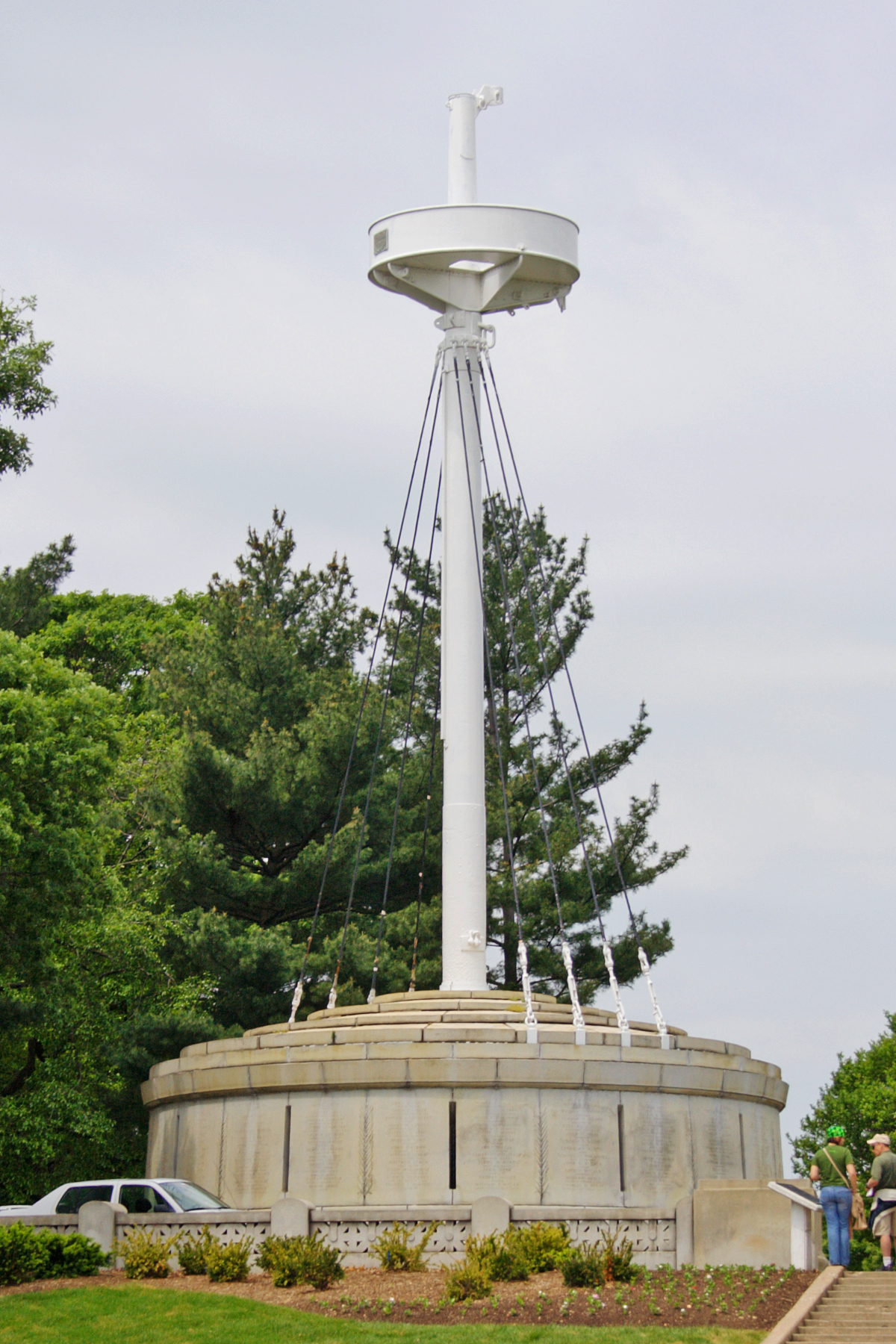
March 23, 1912: USS Maine victims interred at Arlington after 14 years

The following events occurred in March 1912:

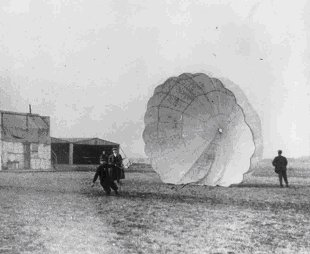
March 1, 1912: Albert Berry becomes first person to parachute from an airplane

== March 1, 1912 (Friday) ==
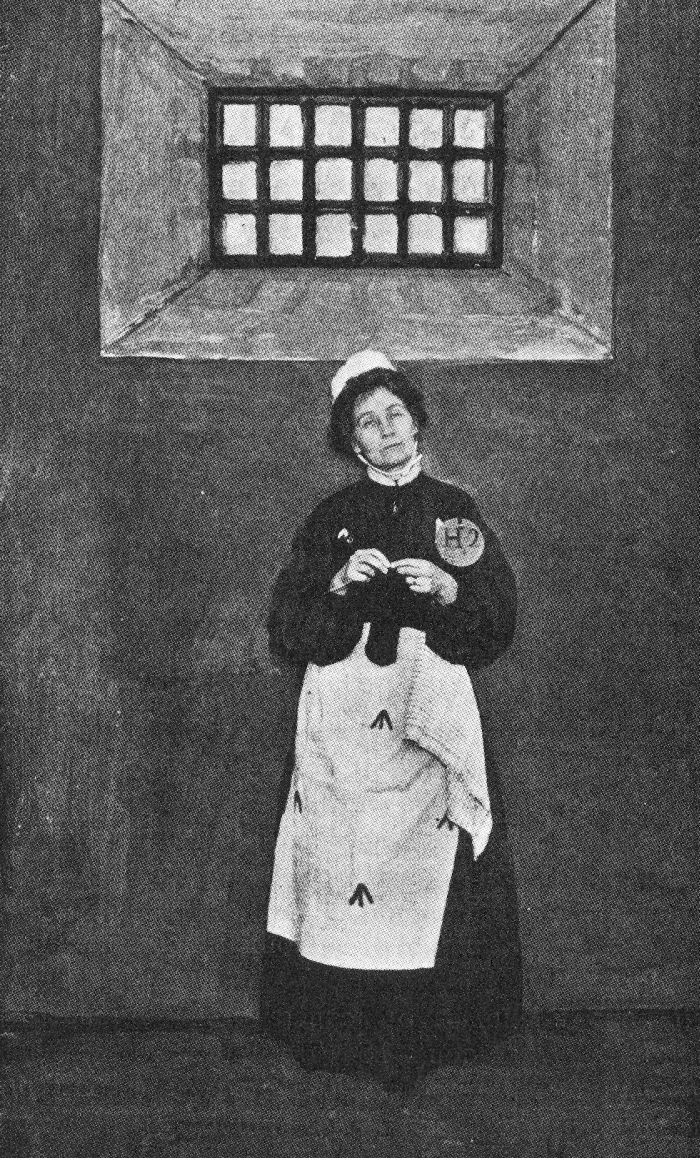
Pankhurst

- Emmeline Pankhurst was among 148 suffragettes who were arrested in London, after they began breaking windows in order to attract attention. At 6:00 p.m., the women, marching in favor of their right to vote, brought out rocks they had been carrying, and attacked storefronts in Westminster. "Never since plate glass was invented has there been such a smashing and shattering of it as was witnessed this evening when the suffragettes went out on a window-breaking raid in the West End of London," The New York Times wrote the next day. Attacks took place on famous streets such as the Strand, Haymarket, Piccadilly, Bond Street, Oxford Street and Regent Street, and even at Prime Minister H. H. Asquith's residence at 10 Downing Street. Mrs. Pankhurst was sentenced to two months in jail, along with Mabel Tuke and Christabel Marshall.
- Albert Berry became the first person to make a parachute jump from an airplane in flight, leaping from above the Jefferson Barracks near St. Louis, after being taken aloft by pilot Tony Jannus. A few months earlier, Berry had been tried in connection with a lynching in Pennsylvania.
- The British coal miners' strike, which had started earlier in the week at one company in Derbyshire, continued to spread across the United Kingdom, with one million workers walking off the job until a fair minimum wage could be guaranteed them.
- Hungarian composer Béla Bartók first heard Bulgarian folk music during a visit to the Austro-Hungarian principality of Transylvania, now part of Romania, where he had been collecting Romanian folk music.
- Born: Boris Chertok, Russian electrical engineer, chief designer of control engineering for the Soviet space program; in Łódź, Russian Empire (now Poland) (d. 2011).
- Died:
  - Edward Blake, 78, Canadian politician, second Premier of Ontario, Leader of the Official Opposition from 1880 to 1887 (b. 1833).
  - George Grossmith, 65, English actor and comic writer, best known for his collaborations with Gilbert and Sullivan (b. 1847).
  - Ludvig Holstein-Ledreborg, 72, Danish state leader, 17th Council President of Denmark, cabinet minister for the Jens Christian Christensen administration (b. 1839).
  - Pyotr Lebedev, 46, Russian physicist, first to measure radiation pressure caused by light (b. 1866).

== March 2, 1912 (Saturday) ==
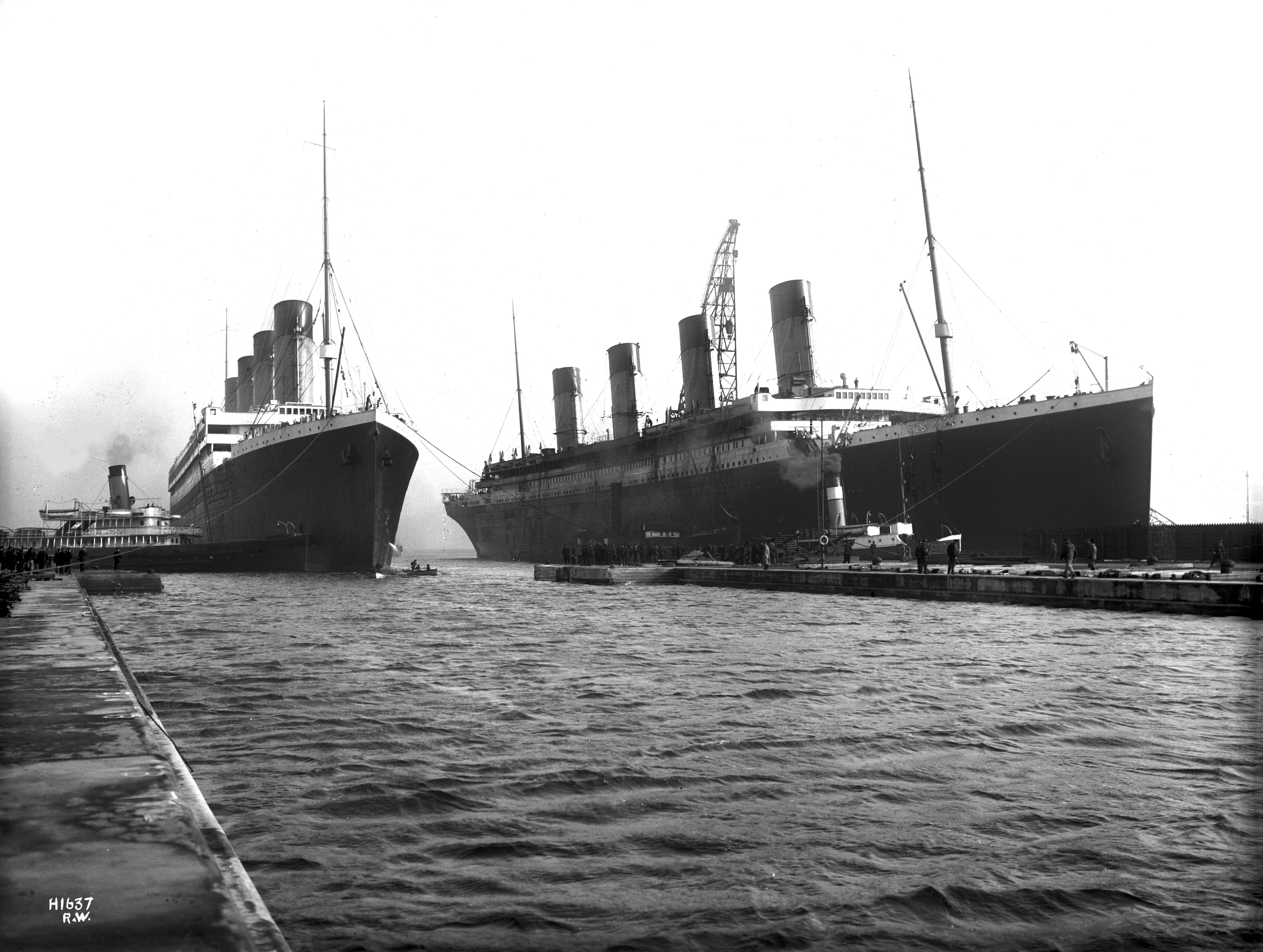
RMS Olympic (left) being maneuvered into drydock in Belfast for repairs on the morning of March 2, 1912 after throwing a propeller blade. The Titanic (right) is moored at the fitting-out wharf. Olympic would sail for Southampton on the 7th, concluding the last time the two ships would be photographed together.

- As rioting broke out in response to the fall of the Manchu dynasty in China, Beijing was placed under martial law. Foreign troops arrived the next day to protect the citizens of their respective nations.
- U.S. President William Howard Taft issued a proclamation warning American citizens to avoid visiting Mexico, and advised those who lived there to be prepared to leave.
- The All England Badminton Championships came to an end in London, with the following results:
  - Frank Chesterton defeated Guy A. Sautter 15-10 and 15–13 in the men's singles finals.
  - Margaret Tragett beat Ethel Thomson Larcombe 11–14, 11–2, and 14–13 in the women's singles finals.
  - Doubles team Henry Norman Marrett and George Thomas defeated Chesteron and Sautter 15-9 and 15–12 in the men's doubles finals.
  - Doubles team Alice Gowenlock and Dorothy Cundall beat runners-up Ireland and Drake 15-2 and 15–5 in the women's doubles finals.
  - Edward Hawthorn and Hazel Hogarth defeated Percy Fitton and Lavinia Radeglia 17-16 and 15–9 in the mixed doubles finals.

== March 3, 1912 (Sunday) ==
- Mexican General Pascual Orozco, who had helped Francisco I. Madero win the revolution of 1911 and become President of Mexico, declared a revolt against the Madero government after having been denied a major role. Orozco and his followers, the "Orozquistas," then assisted Victoriano Huerta in overthrowing Madero.
- An Italian force of 15,000 troops led by Luigi Capello defeated a combined Ottoman-Senussi force under the command of Enver Pasha near Derna, Libya, with around 200 casualties for both sides.
- Pilot Wilfred Parke made the first successful flight of the Avro 500, the forerunner to the Avro 504 that would be used by the Royal Flying Corps in World War I. Parke would be killed in a plane crash on December 15, 1912, at Wembley, England.
- Frieda Weekley met her future husband author D. H. Lawrence in Nottingham.

== March 4, 1912 (Monday) ==
- Ground was broken for a new baseball stadium by Charles Ebbets for his baseball team, the Brooklyn Dodgers.
- The city of Duncan, British Columbia, was incorporated.
- Born:
  - Afro Basaldella, Italian painter, member of the Scuola Romana art movement; in Udine, Italy (d. 1976).
  - Judith Furse, British actress, known for character roles in including the Carry On film series; in Camberley, England (d. 1974).
- Died:
  - Alexander Arthur, 65, British engineer and entrepreneur, founder of the cities of Middlesboro, Kentucky and Harrogate, Tennessee (b. 1846).
  - Augusto Aubry, 62, Italian naval officer, Commander of Italian Navy during the Italo-Turkish War, of illness while on the flagship Vittorio Emanuele at Taranto, Italy (b. 1849).

== March 5, 1912 (Tuesday) ==
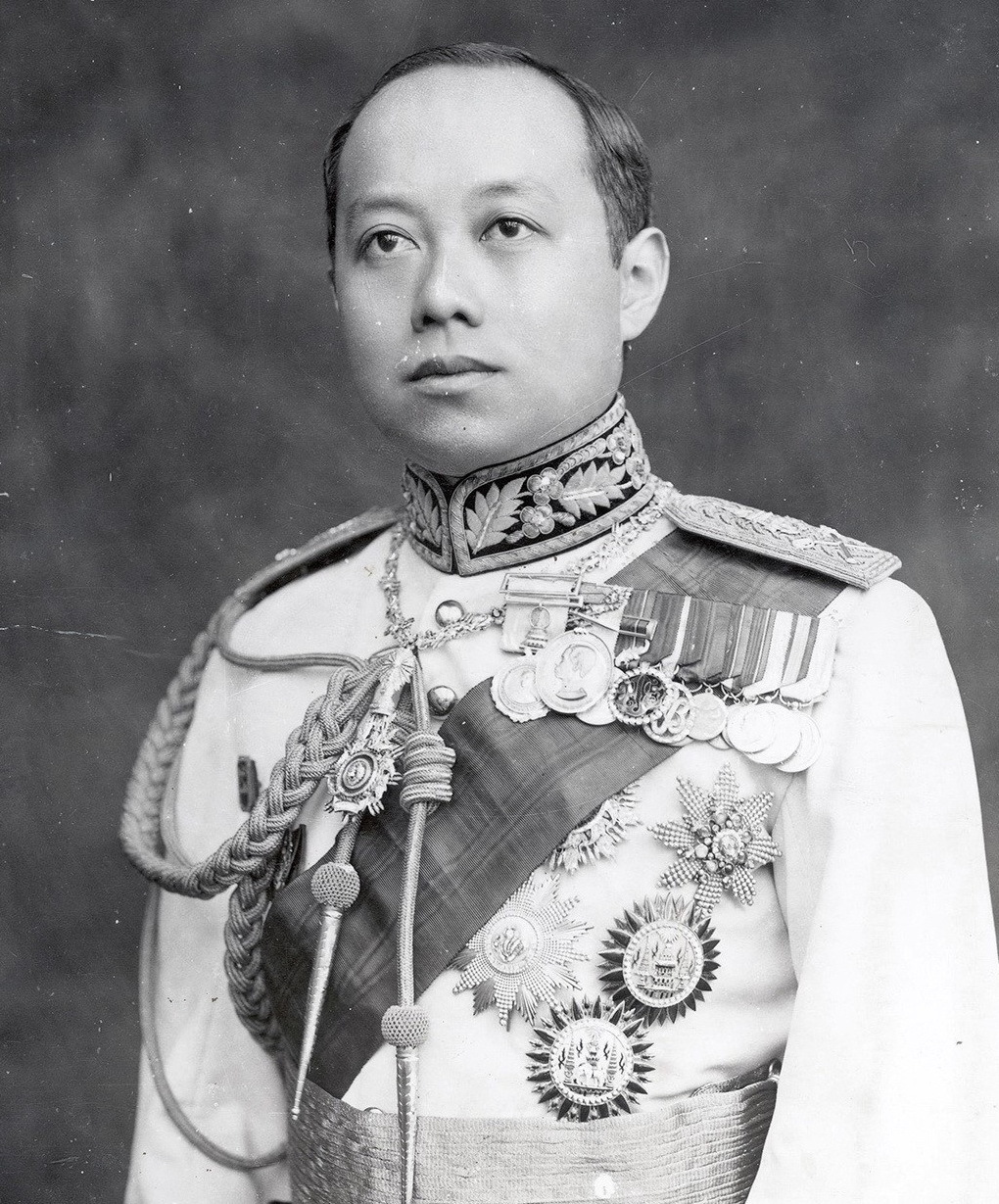
King Vajiravudh

- King Vajiravudh of Siam (now Thailand) ordered mass arrests of officers of the Siamese Army, who had been conspiring to overthrow his government. Most had been graduates of the 1909 class of the Chulachomklao Royal Military Academy.
- Italian forces became the first to use airships in war, as two dirigibles dropped bombs on Turkish troops encamped at Janzur, Libya from an altitude of 6,000 feet.
- The Massachusetts Institute of Technology received a check in the amount of 2.5 million dollars (equivalent to $50,000,000 today) from Eastman Kodak founder George Eastman, fueling the growth of MIT to national prominence.
- The musical The Whirl of Society by Louis Hirsch opened at the Winter Garden Theatre in New York City and ran for 136 performances.
- Ecuadoran General Julio Andrade, former ambassador to Colombia, was killed by his own troops, seven weeks after suppressing the Ecuadorian rebellion.
- The drama Milestones by Arnold Bennett and Edward Knoblock opened at the Royalty Theatre in London and ran for 612 performances.
- Born:
  - David Astor, British newspaper publisher, long-time editor and publisher of The Observer, member of the Astor family; in London (d. 2001).
  - Velma Bronn Johnston, American activist, best known as "Wild Horse Annie" for her successful campaigns to save and protect American wild horses; in Reno, Nevada (d. 1977).
  - Jack Marshall, New Zealand state leader, 28th Prime Minister of New Zealand; in Wellington (d. 1988).

== March 6, 1912 (Wednesday) ==
The Oreo cookie was introduced

- China's Provisional National Assembly voted to accept the resignation of President Sun Yat-sen and to elect Yuan Shikai to succeed him.
- Nicaragua's President Adolfo Díaz ordered the arrest of nearly one hundred newspaper editors and reporters for implying the threat of harm to visiting United States Secretary of State Philander C. Knox, who was touring Central America.
- A general strike involving thousands of tramway workers in Brisbane officially ended but many of the striking workers were fired from their jobs.
- Following a successful acquittal for the murder of former XIT Ranch manager Albert Boyce, Jr. in Fort Worth, Texas, cattle baron John Beal Sneed's father was shot and killed by tenant farmer R. O. Hilliard in Georgetown, Texas. Hilliard committed suicide after, leaving a note that said the killing was in retaliation of Sneed shooting Boyce in January.
- The National Biscuit Company (now Nabisco) introduced the Oreo cookie. The Hydrox cookie, which also consisted of two chocolate cookies with a creme filling in-between, had been introduced by Sunshine Biscuits in 1908, but was less popular, and the brand name was changed in 1999 to "Keebler Droxies."
- Born: George Webb, British actor who portrayed "Daddy" on the British television sitcom Keeping Up Appearances; in Paddington, England (d. 1998).
- Died: Manuel Sánchez Mármol, 72, Mexican novelist, member of the literary realism movement in Mexico (b. 1839).

== March 7, 1912 (Thursday) ==
- The United States Senate voted 76–3 to ratify the American arbitration treaties with the United Kingdom and France, with amendments that removed most controversies from being arbitrated.
- Bulgaria and Serbia signed a mutual defense agreement, providing that if one nation was attacked by Austria-Hungary or the Ottoman Empire, the other would go to war as well.
- Károly Khuen-Héderváry, Prime Minister of Hungary within Austria-Hungary, resigned along with his cabinet after a dispute with the Austrian government.
- The Norwegian Antarctic Expedition came to an end as Roald Amundsen and the ship Fram sailed into Hobart at the Australian state of Tasmania, after having departed Antarctica on January 30. Upon his arrival, he brought the news that he and his party of five had become the first persons to reach the South Pole, planting the flag there on December 14, 1911.
- Standard Oil of Indiana (now Amoco) increased its capital stock from one million to a record $30,000,000 following a vote by its shareholders.

== March 8, 1912 (Friday) ==
- The Reichstag approved a bill to make the Imperial German Navy the greatest in the world by 1920, with construction of 60 large ships and 40 cruisers. One historian noted that the new law proved to be "the death knell to any potential understanding between Britain and Germany." The expansion of the German Navy would be halted, and then reversed, by Germany's 1918 defeat in World War I.
- The German Antarctic mapping expedition, led by Wilhelm Filchner, was brought to a halt when its ship, Deutschland, became entrapped in the polar ice pack at the Weddell Sea. The ship would be trapped for eight months within the moving pack, finally breaking free on November 25, 1912, and nearly 750 miles (1,210 km) further away from Antarctica.
- Born:
  - Vladimir Bakarić, Croatian state leader, first President of the Executive Council of the People's Republic of Croatia; in Velika Gorica, Austria-Hungary, now Croatia (d. 1983).
  - Ray Mueller, American baseball player, catcher for the Cincinnati Reds, Pittsburgh Pirates, New York Giants, and Boston Braves, from 1935 to 1951; in Pittsburg, Kansas (d. 1994).
  - Joachim Schepke, German naval officer, commander of U-boats U-3, U-19, and U-100 during World War II, recepitent of the Knight's Cross of the Iron Cross; in Flensburg, Germany (d. 1941, killed in action).
  - Preston Smith, American politician, 40th Governor of Texas; in Williamson County, Texas (d. 2003).
  - Meldrim Thomson Jr., American politician, 73rd Governor of New Hampshire; in Wilkinsburg, Pennsylvania (d. 2001).

== March 9, 1912 (Saturday) ==
- The Lawrence textile strike ended after the owners of the various clothing mills increased employee wages by at least 5 percent.
- The University of Wisconsin basketball team, which would later be retroactively proclaimed the national champions for the 1911–1912 season by the Helms Athletic Foundation, saved its claim to an unbeaten record after winning 29–26 in overtime in an away game at the University of Minnesota. On March 15, the Badgers would defeat Indiana University, 32–21, to finish the season unbeaten (15-0).

== March 10, 1912 (Sunday) ==
- Yuan Shikai was sworn in as the provisional President of the Republic of China. Described by one historian as "a traitor to the republic just as he had betrayed the Qing" Empire, Yuan would move the capital of the republic from Nanjing back to Beijing, then re-establish the monarchy in 1915 with himself as the new Emperor. Yuan would die in 1916.
- Born: George C. McGhee, American diplomat, 13th Counselor of the United States Department of State; in Waco, Texas (d. 2005).

== March 11, 1912 (Monday) ==
- The provisional constitution of the Republic of China, with 56 articles, was promulgated, giving most executive power to a prime minister and cabinet. It would be replaced in 1914 with a new constitution, giving more power to President Yuan.
- The Miners' Federation of Great Britain offered to meet with Prime Minister H. H. Asquith.
- Coal miners in the German mining regions of Westphalia went on strike, with 200,000 walking off the job at Essen, Hamborn, Duisburg, Oberhausen, Bochum and Recklinghausen. The miners returned to work on March 16.
- Royal Navy submarine A-3 was raised from Portsmouth harbour, along with the remains of the 14 men who had gone down with it when it sank on February 2.
- The University of Hong Kong (UHK) held its first classes, starting with 70 students and a medical school. UHK's enrollment would be more than 22,000 students within 100 years.
- Born: Xavier Montsalvatge, Spanish composer, leading promoter of Catalonian music; in Girona, Spain (d. 2002).
- Died: Lee Shelton, 57, American criminal, known figure in the St. Louis underworld; his killing of Billy Lyons was popularized in the song "Stagger Lee" (b. 1865).

== March 12, 1912 (Tuesday) ==
- British coal operators and representatives of striking miners began their first direct talks, meeting in London.
- Juliette Gordon Low, nicknamed "Daisy," founded the first Girl Scouts troop in the United States, bringing together 18 girls and 8 adults to her home at 329 Abercorn Street in Savannah, Georgia to create the "Girl Guides." Mrs. Low, a widow, had met with Sir Robert Baden-Powell, who had founded the Scouting movement in the United Kingdom in 1907, and then the British Girl Guides.
- McCreary County was established as Kentucky's 120th and last county, created from southern Pulaski County, western Whitley County and eastern Wayne County.
- The Holy Trinity Church was consecrated in Southport, England, although its tower would not be completed until the following year.
- Born:
  - Irving Layton, Romanian-Canadian poet, known for his poetry collections including A Red Carpet for the Sun, recipient of the Governor General's Award and Order of Canada, as Israel Pincu Lazarovitch; in Târgu Neamț, Romania (d. 2006).
  - Paul Weston, American bandleader and musician, known for his big band hits "I Should Care" and "Day by Day"; in Springfield, Massachusetts (d. 1990).

== March 13, 1912 (Wednesday) ==
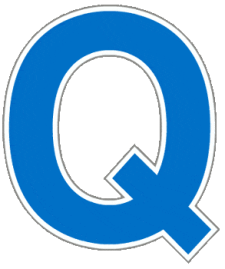
Quebec Bulldogs

- Mahlon Pitney was confirmed by the United States Senate, 50–26, to serve on the Supreme Court of the United States, and took office five days later.
- Abdelaziz Thâalbi, a leader of the Young Tunisians, was prosecuted for supporting a boycott against Italian-owned trams in Tunis. He was expelled from Tunisia along with three other colleagues. Two others were exiled to Tataouine in the south part of the country and another was imprisoned. The boycott continued until the head of the month.
- Bandits Ben Kilpatrick and Ole Hobek were killed while attempting to rob a Southern Pacific train car in Sanderson, Texas. Express messenger David Trousdale used a mallet to kill Hobek when he left Kilpatrick at train's engine to check on the rear cars, then obtained guns to shoot Kilpatrick dead when he ventured back to look for his partner. Trousdale was considered a hero by many in Texas and received cash rewards from Wells Fargo, Southern Pacific Railroad and the federal government, as well as a gold watch from the passengers on the train who were held hostage during the robbery.
- The Quebec Bulldogs, champions of the National Hockey Association, won the Stanley Cup by taking the second game, 8–0, in a best-of-three series against the Moncton Victorias of the Maritime Professional Hockey League.

== March 14, 1912 (Thursday) ==
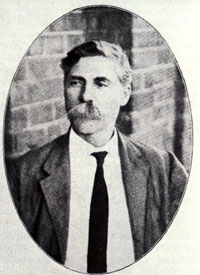
Floyd Allen

- Anarchist Antonio Dalba attempted to assassinate King Victor Emmanuel and Queen Helena at Alba, Italy who had been partaking of 12th anniversary of assassination of King Humbert.
- Lawrence Textile Strike - Striking textile workers in Lawrence, Massachusetts returned to work, after approving the wage agreement with the city's mills.
- In Hillsville, Virginia, storekeeper Floyd Allen was found guilty of interfering with the arrest of his two nephews. As the jury foreman was announcing the recommended sentence of a year in jail and a fine, there was a gun battle in the courtroom. Dead were Carroll County Judge Thornton Massie, County Sheriff Lew Webb, County Prosecutor W. M. Foster, a juror, a witness, and a spectator, while eight others were wounded, including Allen, who would be executed the following year, along with his son Claud.
- Frederick Seddon was convicted of the 1911 poisoning murder of Eliza Barrow in a British court. He would be hanged on April 18, 1912.
- U.S. President William Howard Taft prohibited shipment of weapons to Mexico. The embargo took effect on March 20.
- Born:
  - John Amery, British partisan, founder of the British Free Corps unit for the Waffen-SS during World War II; in Chelsea, London, England (d. 1945, executed).
  - Les Brown, American band leader, known for big band hits including "I've Got My Love to Keep Me Warm"; in Reinerton, Pennsylvania (d. 2001).
  - W. Graham Claytor Jr., American naval officer, 63rd United States Secretary of the Navy; in Roanoke, Virginia (d. 1994).
  - W. Willard Wirtz, American public servant, 10th United States Secretary of Labor; in DeKalb, Illinois (d. 2010).

== March 15, 1912 (Friday) ==
- Forty-five Russian miners were killed in an explosion in Uzovka, Saratov Oblast, Russia.
- Born:
  - Lightnin' Hopkins, American blues musician, pioneer of electric blues and Texas blues; in Centerville, Texas (d. 1982).
  - Rogelio Barriga Rivas, Mexican writer, author of Rio Humano and Juez Letrado; in Tlacolula de Matamoros, Mexico (d. 1961).
- Died: Cesare Arzelà, 64, Italian mathematician, known for the Arzelà–Ascoli theorem used in mathematical analysis (b. 1847).

== March 16, 1912 (Saturday) ==
- The P&O ocean liner Oceana, bound from London to Bombay, sank after colliding with the German barge Pisagua at Beachy Head, England. All of the 241 passengers and crew were evacuated from the ship, but nine people died when their lifeboat, first to be launched, was swamped and capsized, and another lifeboat took on so much water that it was on the verge of turning over before its occupants were saved. One author would note later that the event "surely contributed to the initial reluctance of Titanic passengers to board their lifeboats" the following month.
- After the removal of the sailors' bodies who died in its 1898 explosion, the USS Maine was towed to sea by the USS Osceola into international waters, three miles from Havana Harbor, and sunk again to a depth of 620 fathoms (roughly 3,700 feet or 1,100 meters).
- The United States Senate passed a bill giving "local citizenship" to residents of the Philippines who had been subjects of Spain in 1899. U.S. President William Howard Taft signed the bill into law on March 23, 1912.
- Born: Pat Nixon, American social leader, First Lady of the United States from 1969 to 1974, as Thelma Catherine Ryan; in Ely, Nevada (d. 1993).

== March 17, 1912 (Sunday) ==
- Despite a general amnesty proclaimed on March 11 by President Yuan Shikai, 200 rebels in China were executed at Guangzhou.
- Lawrence Oates, one of the five remaining members of Robert Falcon Scott's South Pole expedition, left the tent saying, "I am just going outside and may be some time." Captain Scott, who was already seriously ill after he and his group marched back from the South Pole, reported the event in his diary, but was not sure whether it happened on the 17th or 18th of March. Oates' body was never found.
- Born: Bayard Rustin, American activist, member of the March on Washington Movement and March on Washington for Jobs and Freedom civil rights movement; in West Chester, Pennsylvania (d. 1987).
- Died:
  - Anna Filosofova, 74, Russian activist, founding member of the feminist movement in Russia (b. 1837).
  - George W. Melville, 71, American naval officer and explorer, 6th Chief of the Bureau of Steam Engineering, member of the Jeannette expedition to the Arctic (b. 1841).

== March 18, 1912 (Monday) ==
- In San Antonio, 26 people were killed, and another 32 injured, by the explosion of a boiler on a locomotive owned by the Southern Pacific Railroad. Most were repairmen working for the railroad, but some were local residents.
- U.S. Senator Albert B. Cummins of Iowa introduced a bill for a nationwide primary election to select presidential and vice-presidential party nominees, as well as electors, to be held on the second Monday of July prior to every presidential election, beginning with July 8, 1912, and prohibiting American political parties from holding nomination conventions.
- Born:
  - Art Gilmore, American radio and television announcer, known for his television voice work including the 1950s television police show Highway Patrol; in Tacoma, Washington (d. 2010).
  - Lucien Laurin, Canadian racehorse trainer, trained celebrated racehorses Secretariat and Riva Ridge; in Joliette, Quebec (d. 2000).
  - Sabicas, Spanish musician, best known for flamenco guitar recordings, as Agustín Castellón Campos; in Pamplona, Spain (d. 1990).
  - Wilhelm Schäfer, German writer, member of the naturalism movement; in Ottrau, Germany (d. 1952).

== March 19, 1912 (Tuesday) ==
- Rebels laid siege to Asunción in Paraguay.
- The British government passed the Coal Mines Act to introduce minimum wage for coal miners as part of the resolution to the national coal strike.
- The first statewide presidential primary ever held in the United States took place in North Dakota, where Republican Party voters favored Robert M. La Follette over former President Theodore Roosevelt. William Howard Taft, the incumbent president, finished third.
- The Canadian aircraft Cygnet was discontinued following an unsatisfactory test flight by John McCurdy at Bras d'Or Lake, Nova Scotia.
- The patent for the concept underpinning the maglev train, described as a "levitating transmitting apparatus," was awarded to French-American inventor Émile Bachelet.
- Born:
  - William Frankland, British medical researcher, noted for his research on allergies to penicillin and pollen; in Battle, East Sussex, England (d. 2020).
  - Adolf Galland, German air force officer, commander of Jagdgeschwader 26 and Jagdverband 44 squadrons of the Luftwaffe during World War II, recipient of the Knight's Cross of the Iron Cross and Spanish Cross; in Herten, Germany (d. 1996).
- Died: Thomas Harrison Montgomery Jr., American biologist, known for his research into sex determination (b. 1873).

== March 20, 1912 (Wednesday) ==
- The sinking of Australian steamer SS Koombana in a cyclone killed all 150 people on board. The Adelaide Lines ship had departed Port Hedland, Western Australia, earlier in the day on a voyage to Broome. SS Koombana was accompanied by another liner, SS Bullara, when the cyclone struck them both. While the Bullara was able to reach port, Koombana was never seen again.
- Shortly after 9:00 am, an explosion at the Mine #2 of the Sans Bois Coal Company in McCurtain, Oklahoma, killed 52 men.
- The spring exhibition by the Société des Artistes Indépendants opened in Paris, featuring works by Cubist artists Albert Gleizes (The Bathers) and Jean Metzinger (Women With Horse).

== March 21, 1912 (Thursday) ==
- Revolutionaries seized control of the Paraguayan capital of Asunción after two days of fighting. General Emiliano González Navero, who had been president from 1908 to 1910, took control the next day as the President of the provisional government after President Pedro Peña took refuge at the Uruguayan embassy.
- Born: Ghazi of Iraq, Iraqi state leader, second King of Iraq, son of King Faisal; in Mecca (d. 1939, killed in an auto accident).
- Died: David J. Foster, 54, U.S. Representative from Vermont in his sixth term (b. 1857).

== March 22, 1912 (Friday) ==
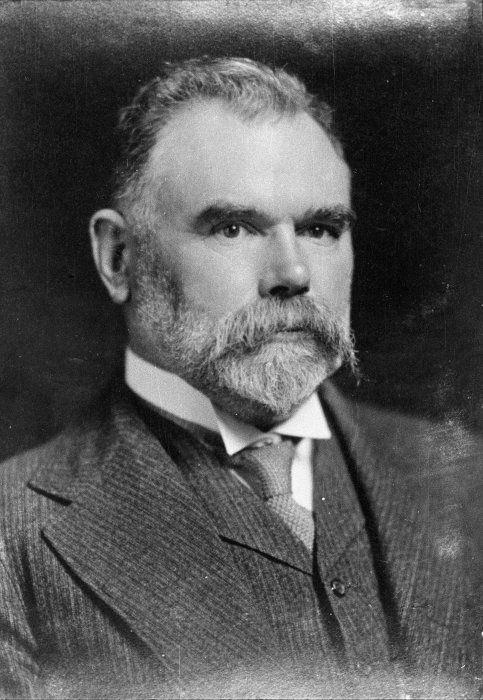
Thomas Mackenzie

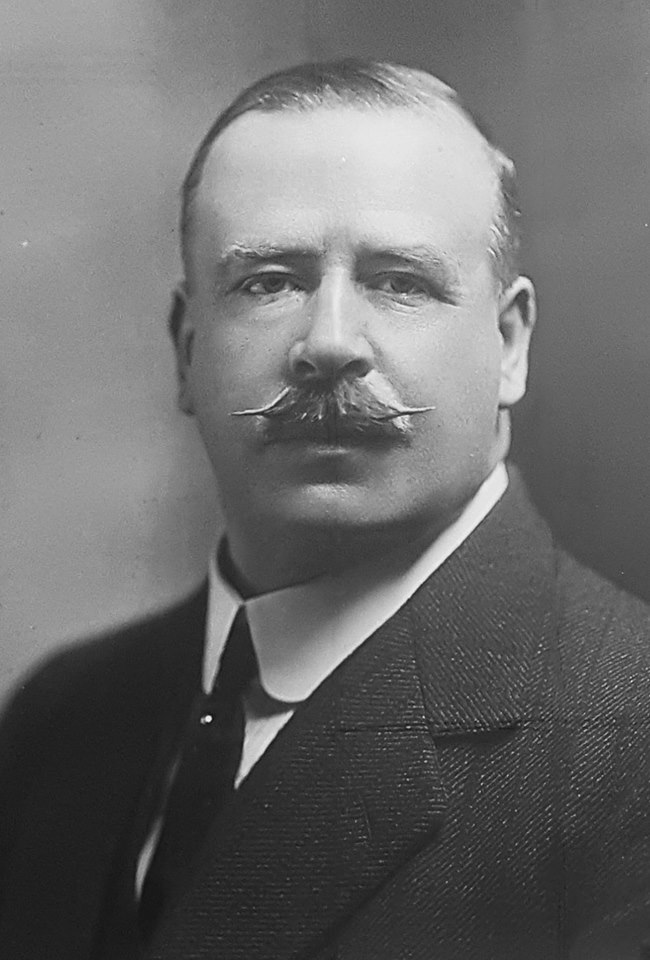
Joseph Ward

- A cyclone struck Balla Balla and Port Hedland in Western Australia. Over 150 people were killed in the storm, including the loss of all passengers and crew of the coastal steamer Koombana which was presumed sunk after search crews came across floating debris that was part of the ship on April 2. The wreck has never been found.
- Thomas Mackenzie was elected Prime Minister of New Zealand by members of the Liberal-Labour Party, which controlled the Parliament, winning 72–9. The incumbent Premier, Sir Joseph Ward, deferred his resignation until Mackenzie could select a Cabinet.
- The French Chamber of Deputies passed a vote of confidence approving the nation's policies in Morocco.
- Women suffragettes in China occupied the National Assembly building in Nanjing.
- The largest province in British India, the Bengal Province, was broken up as the new province of Bihar and Orissa, now part of India, was separated from the region.
- Guy Bowman, publisher of the London newspaper Syndicalist, was sentenced to 9 1/2 years of hard labor on charges of inciting a mutiny.
- Yamaoka Engineer Works was established in Osaka, predecessor to the engine manufacturer Yanmar.
- Born:
  - Wilfrid Brambell, Irish actor, known for his lead role in the BBC television series Steptoe and Son and The Beatles film A Hard Day's Night; in Dublin (d. 1985).
  - Karl Malden, American actor, known for his lead role in the television crime series The Streets of San Francisco and film roles in A Streetcar Named Desire and Patton, recipient for Academy Award for Best Supporting Actor for On the Waterfront, as Mladen Sekulovich; in Chicago (d. 2009).
  - Agnes Martin, Canadian-American artist, member of the abstract expressionism movement in the United States; in Macklin, Saskatchewan (d. 2004).
  - Alfred Schwarzmann, German athlete, three-time gold medalist at the 1936 Summer Olympics (d. 2000).
- Died: Henry H. Bingham, 70, American politician, U.S. Representative from Pennsylvania from 1879 to 1912, recipient of the Medal of Honor for his actions at the Battle of the Wilderness during the American Civil War, had Bingham County, Idaho named in his honor (b. 1841).

== March 23, 1912 (Saturday) ==
- The recently recovered bones of the remaining 67 officers and men of the USS Maine, whose deaths led to the Spanish–American War, were buried in Arlington National Cemetery. Interred after fourteen years underwater, the remains, none identifiable, were placed in thirty-four coffins. In 1899, ninety-six of the crew had been buried at Arlington.
- The Boston Elevated Railway opened a new line, three years in the making, from Park Street to Harvard.
- Kaiser Wilhelm met with Emperor Franz Joseph, at the Schönbrunn Palace in Vienna.
- Born:
  - Wernher von Braun, German-American engineer, designer of the V-2 rocket; in Wirsitz, Germany (now Wyrzysk, Poland) (d. 1977).
  - Eleanor Cameron, Canadian-American children's writer, author of The Wonderful Flight to the Mushroom Planet; in Winnipeg (d. 1996).
- Died: Saint Maria Josefa of the Heart of Jesus Sancho de Guerra, 69, Spanish Basque nun and founder of the Religious Servants of Jesus of Charity, which had 43 missions in Spain at the time of her death, first Basque person to be canonized.

== March 24, 1912 (Sunday) ==
- An army of 6,000 rebel troops under command of Pascual Orozco defeated around 7,000 federal soldiers at Rellano, Chihuahua, Mexico, inflicting 600 casualties while sustaining 200 themselves. The victory was a high point in the rebellion but two months later the rebels were defeated at the same location.
- The Greek Liberal Party led by Prime Minister Eleftherios Venizelos won a majority of seats in elections in Greece.
- Kopassis Effendi, the disliked Ottoman Prince-Governor of the Greek province of Samos, was assassinated by a Greek national.
- Germany won the first Ligue International de Hockey sur Glace championship in Brussels.
- Born: Dorothy Height, American activist, long-time president of the National Council of Negro Women; in Richmond, Virginia (d. 2010).

== March 25, 1912 (Monday) ==
- The ambassadors of the "Four Powers" (the United States, the United Kingdom, Germany and France) presented a joint memo to the Chinese government, protesting China's recent borrowing of more money from Belgium.
- Born: Jean Vilar, French actor, founder of the Festival d'Avignon and Théâtre National Populaire; in Sète, France (d. 1971).

== March 26, 1912 (Tuesday) ==
- Eighty-one miners were killed in an explosion at the Jed Coal and Coke Company near Welch, West Virginia.
- Police in Rock Island, Illinois fired into a crowd of rioters, killing three of them, as they marched toward City Hall against Mayor H.M. Schriver.
- Following the results of an earlier primary, the Arizona Senate selected Marcus A. Smith and Henry F. Ashurst as the new state's first U.S. Senators.
- The gift by Tokyo Mayor Yukio Ozaki of 3,000 cherry blossom trees arrived in Washington, D.C.

== March 27, 1912 (Wednesday) ==
- The second government under Prime Minister Petre P. Carp was dissolved in Romania.
- The House of Commons of the United Kingdom passed the Minimum Wage Bill, 213–48. The measure passed the House of Lords on the third reading, without dissent, two days later and royal assent was given the same day.
- By a vote of 40–34 in the United States Senate, U.S. Senator Isaac Stephenson of Wisconsin was exonerated of charges of corruption in securing his 1907 election and allowed to return to his seat.
- The New Mexico state legislature elected Albert B. Fall and Thomas B. Catron as the new state's first U.S. Senators, after eight ballots. Four legislators were arrested during the balloting on charges of soliciting bribes.

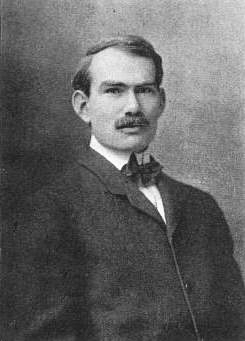
Lee De Forest

- Two weeks after the failure of his North American Wireless company, Lee de Forest, who had made radio broadcasting practical with the invention of the Audion tube, was served with an arrest warrant in Palo Alto, California, and charged in federal court with using the mail to defraud investors. He was kept out of jail by friends who posted his bond and would be acquitted of the charges in 1913.
- Born: James Callaghan, British state leader, 94th Prime Minister of the United Kingdom; in Copnor, Portsmouth, Hampshire, England (d. 2005)

== March 28, 1912 (Thursday) ==
- A resolution to allow women the right to vote failed in the United Kingdom House of Commons was defeated, on its second reading, by eight votes, 208 to 222.
- Richard McBride of the Conservative Party of British Columbia was reelected as premier in the province's 13th provincial election.
- The "best interests of the child" became the standard in custody cases in the United Kingdom, by precedent established in the case of the Crown v. Walker.
- Being unable to directly prohibit the sale of white phosphorus matches, shown to be poisonous, the United States Senate voted to set a high sales tax on the product.
- Titu Maiorescu formed his first government of Romania.
- Born:
  - A. Bertram Chandler, English-Australian science fiction writer, best known for his Rim Word series including The Rim of Space; in Aldershot, England (d. 1984).
  - Léon Damas, French poet, promoter of the négritude movement in France; in Cayenne, French Guiana (d. 1978).

== March 29, 1912 (Friday) ==
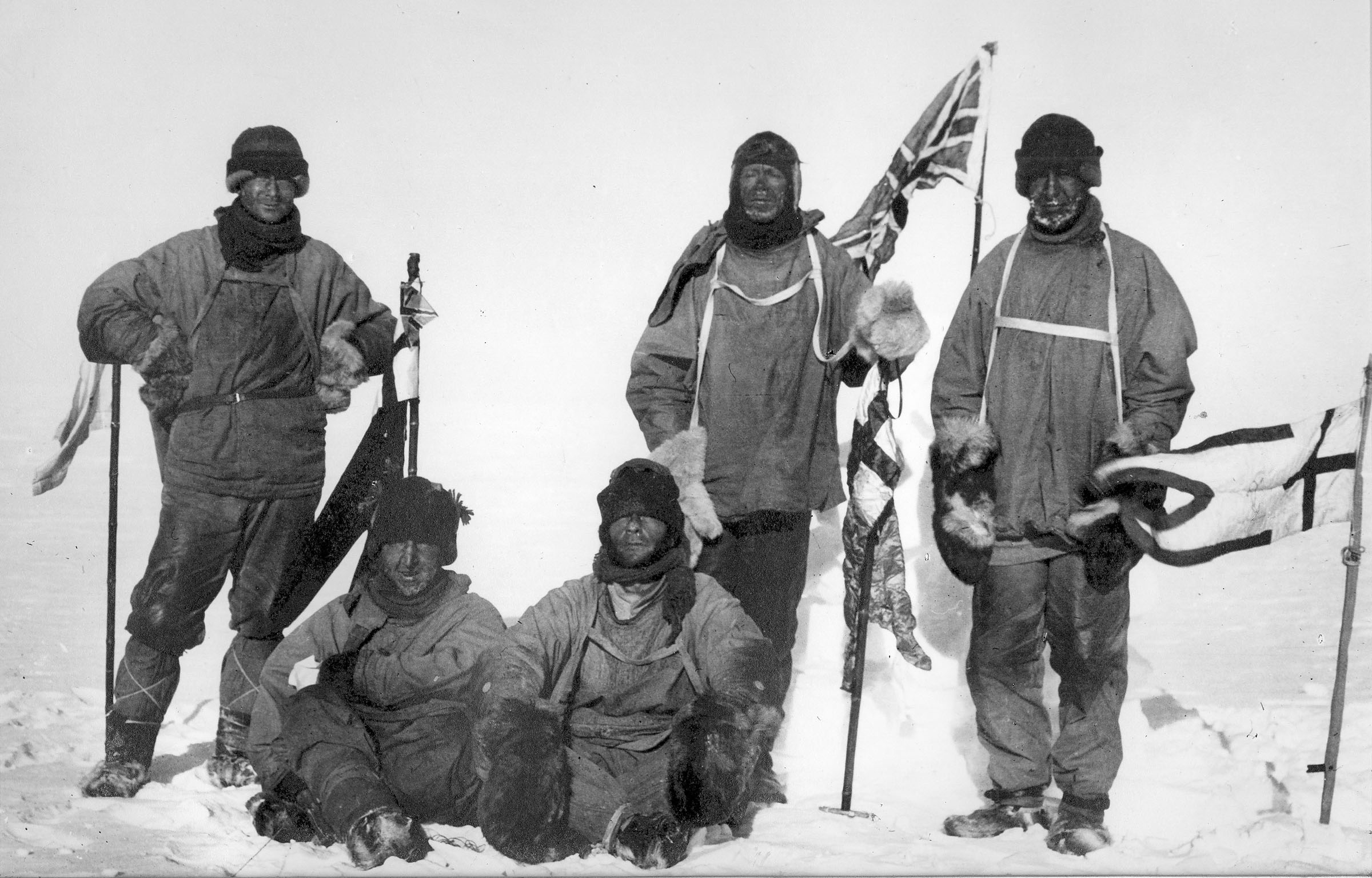
The ill-fated Scott expedition members

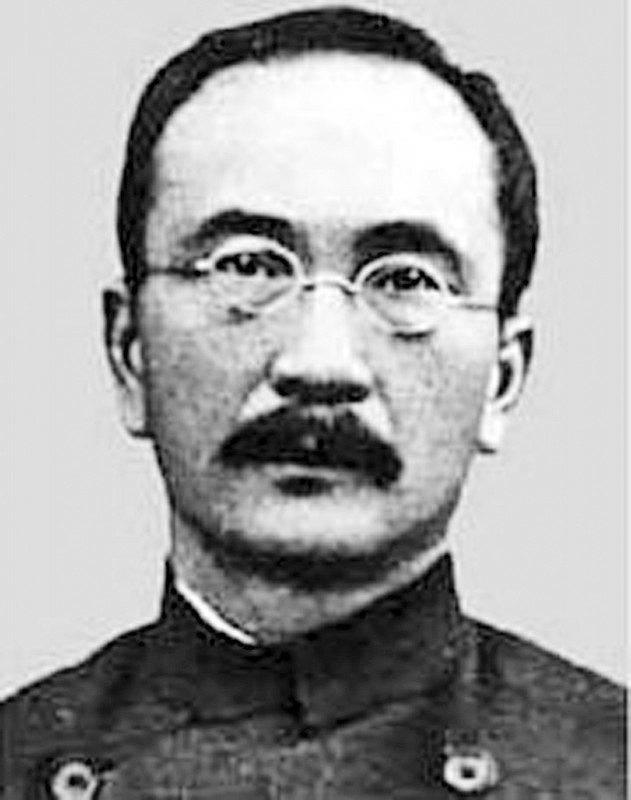
Tang Shaoyi

- The three remaining members of Robert Falcon Scott's South Pole expedition — Henry Robertson Bowers, 28, Dr. Edward Wilson, 39, and Captain Scott himself, 43 — died while waiting out a blizzard in their tent, still nearly 150 miles from their base camp. Their bodies would be discovered by a search party in November.
- Tang Shaoyi formed a cabinet as the first Prime Minister of China.
- Mexico permitted the United States to ship 1,000 rifles and one million rounds of ammunition to American citizens living in Mexico.
- The New York State Assembly voted 76–67 in favor of granting women the right to vote. Before the bill could go to the state Senate, assembly member Louis A. Cuvillier moved to reconsider the vote and to table further action. His motion passed 69–67.
- Born: Hanna Reitsch, German pilot, one of the three women pilots for the Luftwaffe and the Society of Experimental Test Pilots during World War II, recipient of the Iron Cross; in Hirschberg im Riesengebirge, German Empire (d. 1979).
- Died: John Gerrard Keulemans, Dutch artist, best known for illustrations of birds for various books on ornithology including Frederick DuCane Godman and Edgar Leopold Layard (b. 1842).

== March 30, 1912 (Saturday) ==
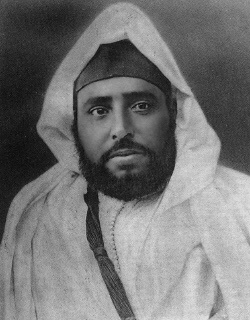
Sultan Abdelhafid

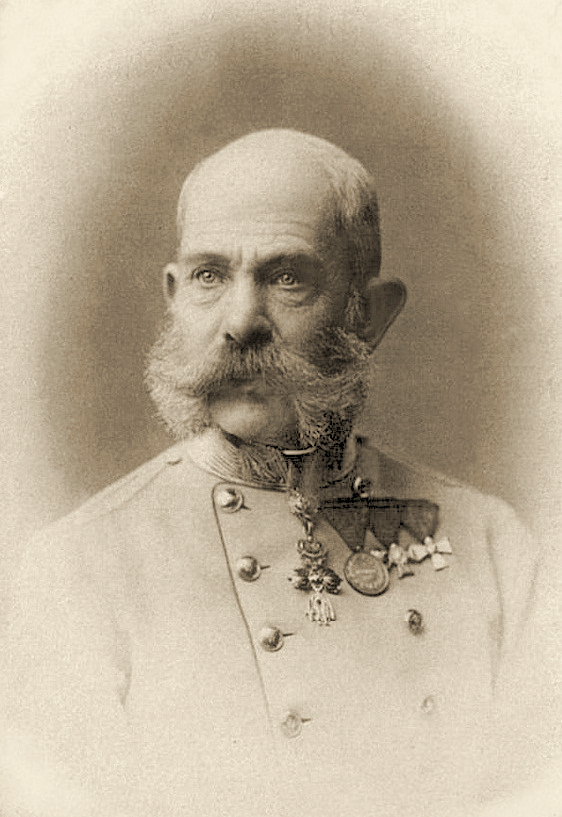
Emperor Franz Joseph

- The French Third Republic established the French protectorate in Morocco after Sultan Abd al-Hafid of Morocco signed the Treaty of Fes at 1:30 pm with a representative of the foreign ministry, effectively ending the Agadir Crisis that plagued the region throughout much of 1911. The "protection" included French power to introduce administrative, judicial, educational, economic, financial and military reforms" as deemed useful, and for the French Army to occupy Morocco as necessary to maintain order, and would last until 1956.
- The Chamber of Deputies of France voted to approve a measure limiting a coal miner's work day.
- Emperor Franz Joseph threatened to abdicate from the throne of Austria-Hungary if the governments of the two nations could not resolve their disagreement.
- U.S. Senator Thomas Gore of Oklahoma was attacked with a club by Charles Schomulla while speaking at Waukesha, Wisconsin. One of the hosts, Judge P.C. Hamlin, pushed the would-be assassin off the stage. Senator Gore, who was blind, was unaware of the incident.
- French runner Jean Bouin won the individual competition at the International Cross Country Championships in Edinburgh, completing the 10-mile course with a time of 51 minutes and 46 seconds. The England men's team won the group competition.
- In the annual race between the rowing teams of Oxford and Cambridge, both boats sank after being swamped in rough weather. The race was rowed again two days later, with Oxford as the victor.
- Born: Jack Cowie, New Zealand cricketer, bowler for the New Zealand national cricket team and Auckland cricket team from 1937 to 1949; in Auckland (d. 1994).
- Died:
  - Karl May, 70, German, writer, author of adventure stories including the first Western novels (b. 1842).
  - Lina Ramann, 78, German, biographer of Franz Liszt (b. 1833).

== March 31, 1912 (Sunday) ==
- General Leónidas Plaza, the victor over rebel army troops during the War of the Generals, was selected as the new President of Ecuador. He had previously been president from 1901 to 1905.
- John Redmond, Eoin MacNeill, Patrick Pearse, Tim Healy and others address a monster meeting of 200,000 people in favour of home rule at the General Post Office on O'Connell Street, Dublin.
- Edward Smith arrived in Belfast to take command of the recently outfitted White Star Line ocean liner Titanic ten days before it was to begin its first voyage.
- The ship Terra Nova, which had carried Captain Scott's expedition party to Antarctica, arrived at New Zealand. Spokesmen reported that Scott's party had come within at least 150 miles of the South Pole and that he and the group would remain in the Antarctic for another winter, unaware that the five explorers had died on their way back from the South Pole.
- French cyclist Henri Pélissier won the 6th Milan–San Remo, completing the 290-kilometre course with a time of 9 hours, 44 minutes, 30 seconds.
- Born: William Lederer, American writer, author of The Ugly American; in New York City (d. 2009).
- Died: Robert Love Taylor, 61, American politician, 24th Governor of Tennessee (b. 1850).
