= The Gelignite Gang =

1956 British crime film by Terence Fisher and Francis Searle

- American release poster
- Directed by: Francis Searle
- Written by: Brandon Fleming
- Story by: Brandon Fleming
- Produced by: Brandon Fleming; Geoffrey Goodhart
- Starring: Wayne Morris; Sandra Dorne
- Cinematography: Cedric Williams
- Edited by: Douglas Myers
- Music by: Jerry Levy
- Production company: Cybex Film Productions
- Distributed by: Renown Pictures (UK); Astor Pictures (US)
- Release date: March 1956 (UK)
- Running time: 74 minutes
- Country: United Kingdom
- Language: English

The Gelignite Gang (U.S. title The Dynamiters) is a 1956 British black and white second feature crime film directed by Francis Searle starring Wayne Morris and Sandra Dorne. It was written by Brandon Fleming.

== Plot ==
American insurance investigator Jimmy Baxter works for the Anglo American Investigation Company in England. He searches for a gang of jewel robbers who use gelignite as part of their modus operandi. He goes to The Green Dragon Club to interview its owner Mr Popoulos. After he leaves, the head waiter, Bergman, calls him from a phone box, but before he can say much he is shot dead by an unseen assailant.

Baxter is more successful than his boss at chatting up the office secretary, Sally, and asks her to dinner at the Green Dragon Club.

Sally does some sleuthing on her own and finds valuable clues. Baxter tracks the gang to its lair, but then Sally is kidnapped by Mr. G., the gang's secret mastermind, and tied up in a warehouse.

Initially the old pawnbroker appears to be the mastermind. The gang are tracked to his pawn shop and when they fail to shoot their way out they set fire to the building. Ultimately Mr G. appears to be Rutherford, the boss of Anglo American.

== Cast ==
- Wayne Morris as Jimmy Baxter
- James Kenney as Chris Chapman
- Patrick Holt as John Rutherford
- Sandra Dorne as Sally Morton
- Simone Silva as Simone
- Eric Pohlmann as Mr. Popoulus
- Lloyd Lamble as Detective-Inspector Felby
- Arthur Young as Pop Scobie
- Tony Doonan as Jagar
- Hugh Miller as Mr. Crosby
- Mark Daly as 1st watchman
- Monti De Lyle as Barton, 'Bergman'
- Bernadette Milnes as Kay Mallen
- Bertha Russell as Mrs Chapman
- Ossie Morris as 2nd watchman
- Leigh Crutchley as Hopman
- Herbert St John as Mr. Woodgate

== Critical reception ==
The Monthly Film Bulletin wrote: "Straightforward crime thriller on a modest scale, with fast and furious action in familiar London surroundings."

Kine Weekly wrote: "Lively expertly carpentered crime melodrama. ... Its bizarre plot, competently portrayed, unfolds against colourful Soho backgrounds and the variety of its settings subtly brings out its fruity flavour. The ninepennies will swallow it all right. Good British programmer. ... The picture, complete with catchy signature tune, neatly mixes romance, crime, suspense and surprise and adds adolescent delinquency for full measure."

Picturegoer wrote: "Short on excitement, it has novelty and good pace, with fair acting from Morris, Patrick Holt (his partner) and Sandra Dome (a sleuthing secretary). James Kenney, as a young crook, outshines the lot."

Picture Show wrote: "Good thriller entertainment."

The Daily Film Renter wrote: "Movement and tension are fairly well maintained throughout. There's a pleasant, if minor, romantic interest, and a sexy song from Simone Silva. The result is sound entertainment of a familiar kind, just the right length for family audiences in double bills."

Chibnall and McFarlane in The British 'B' Film wrote: "It is hard to imagine anyone finding much pleasure in Francis Searle's The Gelignite Gang except for the frequent unintentional laughs provided by its clichéd script and wooden direction. ... The film's only redeeming feature is a reasonably well-filmed rooftop shootout."

In British Sound Films: The Studio Years 1928–1959 David Quinlan rated the film as "mediocre", writing: "Fast-moving crime drama is short on actual action, has unintentional laughs in shoals."

== See also ==
- List of British films of 1956
