= The Floating Dutchman (novel) =

1950 novel by Nicolas Bentley

- First edition
- Author: Nicolas Bentley
- Language: English
- Genre: Crime
- Publisher: Michael Joseph; Duell (US)
- Publication date: 1950
- Publication place: United Kingdom
- Media type: Print

The Floating Dutchman is a 1950 crime novel by the British writer Nicolas Bentley.

== Film adaptation ==
In 1952 it was made into film of the same title directed by Vernon Sewell and starring Dermot Walsh, Sydney Tafler and Mary Germaine.

== Bibliography ==
- Goble, Alan. The Complete Index to Literary Sources in Film. Walter de Gruyter, 1999.
- Reilly, John M. Twentieth Century Crime & Mystery Writers. Springer, 2015.
