= Simone Silva =

French actress (1928–1957)

- Born: Martha Simone de Bouillard; 15 August 1928; Cairo, Egypt
- Died: 30 November 1957 (aged 29); London, England
- Occupation: Actress
- Years active: 1950 – 1957

Martha Simone de Bouillard (15 August 1928 – 30 November 1957), better known as Simone Silva, was an Egyptian and French film actress who appeared in a handful of British B-movies during the 1950s. Silva, who was once quoted as saying she would "do anything" to get in the newspapers, was known however less for her acting than for her voluptuous figure and publicity-seeking activities. She briefly made global headlines following a notorious incident at the 1954 Cannes Film Festival where she posed topless with Robert Mitchum for photographers, causing a sensation when the photographs were flashed around the world.

== Early career ==
Born in Cairo to French-Italian parents in 1928, Silva moved to England in 1946 after marrying an Englishman (divorced 1953), believing that England would provide opportunities for her to be noticed by American talent scouts and give her a better chance to achieve her ultimate goal of making a career in the U.S.

From the early 1950s until her last days Silva made a living by posing as a photographic pin-up model for the cheesecake magazines of the era. She broke into British films in 1951 with a small uncredited non-speaking part in Lady Godiva Rides Again as a beauty pageant contestant. This was followed by two more anonymous bit part roles before she landed a slightly more substantial part in the adventure film South of Algiers (1953). She was fifth-billed in crime drama Escape by Night, then appeared among a lengthy female cast list in the women's prison drama The Weak and the Wicked (1954). Her first and only top-billing came as a femme-fatale opposite Lloyd Bridges in the Hammer Films programmer Third Party Risk. She appeared onstage in the West End in the 1952 play Meet Mr. Callaghan.

== Cannes incident ==
Simone Silva posing topless with Robert Mitchum during the 1954 Cannes festival.

In March 1954 Silva travelled to Cannes for the seventh Film Festival in an attempt to get herself noticed. She succeeded, and the festival organisers awarded her the honorary title of "Miss Festival 1954". She was asked to pose for press photographs with Robert Mitchum on a beach of one of the French Riviera's Lérins Islands, near Cannes. The photocall turned into the story of the festival when Silva removed her top and posed cupping her bare breasts in her hands, while Mitchum played along. Such was the scramble to get the best shots that several photographers were injured in the melée, with two reportedly suffering broken limbs. The press loved it, and the photographs were published around the world. The festival committee, however, were horrified that what they considered a vulgar and cheap publicity stunt had completely overshadowed the serious business of the fortnight, and Silva was asked to leave the festival.

== U.S. disappointment ==
Immediately after the Cannes furor, Silva traveled to the U.S., hoping to cash in on her new-found notoriety. However, she soon ran into trouble with the Immigration and Naturalization Service when it was learned that she had entered the country on a tourist visa and had not applied for a work permit, although she had been offered a contract by an independent filmmaker, Al Petker, and was receiving a salary. In June 1954, the District Immigration Director in Los Angeles refused her retroactive application for a work permit, ordering her to leave the US within 60 days, and observing that: "She did not make a sufficient showing to conclude if she was a person of unusual ability and talent, or professional attainment." The decision was appealed on Silva's behalf by Petker, and she was granted a temporary work permit pending the appeal being heard. Relations with Petker quickly soured, and by November 1954 Silva was hospitalised with severe vomiting, claiming that worry was the root cause of her illness. Silva accused Petker of failing to pay her salary, while he countered that he had suspended her for gaining a significant amount of weight.

Silva's application to become a permanent US resident was heard in Los Angeles on 3 December 1954, and was denied. She was again given the right of appeal. In February 1955, Silva was again in court when she filed suit against a nightclub in Palm Beach, Florida, alleging that they had offered her a contract for seven weeks' work but had reneged at the end of the first week. Silva's final appeal for US residency was heard on 4 May 1955, and was turned down. She was told to leave the country by 7 June, or face deportation back to England. Silva could not be located on 7 June and it was reported that she had not been seen by her lawyer in Los Angeles for two weeks. It was concluded that she had returned to England on her own, without notifying the relevant parties.

== Return to the UK and death ==
After her return to the UK, Silva found it difficult to resurrect her fledgling film career. She made one more screen appearance, a small role in the low-budget crime picture The Gelignite Gang in 1956. She briefly tried stage acting, with little critical success. A performance in Glasgow in June 1956 was described as "too brash, too strident". Her last credit was two episodes of television adventure serial The Gay Cavalier in early 1957. Silva attempted to garner publicity by hinting to journalists that she was planning another stunt for the 1957 Cannes Film Festival, but what she planned is unknown as nothing materialised.

Silva was found dead in her London apartment on 30 November 1957, aged 29. An autopsy gave the cause of death as a stroke. Silva's struggles with her weight had been ongoing, and friends believed that her lengthy period of rigorous crash-dieting had been a likely factor in her death.

== Filmography ==
| Year | Title | Role | Notes |
|---|---|---|---|
| 1950 | Le Tampon du Capiston | | |
| 1951 | The Sleepwalker | Louise | Uncredited |
| 1951 | Lady Godiva Rides Again | Beauty Queen Contestant | Uncredited |
| 1952 | The Secret People | Minor Role - Paris Sequence | Uncredited |
| 1952 | Bachelor in Paris | Marie- Louise (Perfumer) | Uncredited |
| 1953 | Desperate Moment | Mink, Valentin's girl | |
| 1953 | South of Algiers | Zara | |
| 1953 | Turn the Key Softly | Marie | Uncredited |
| 1953 | Street of Shadows | Angele Abbé | |
| 1953 | Escape by Night | Rosetta Mantania | |
| 1954 | The Weak and the Wicked | Tina | |
| 1954 | Duel in the Jungle | Redhead | Uncredited |
| 1954 | Third Party Risk | Mitzi Molnaur | |
| 1956 | The Gelignite Gang | Simone - Nightclub Singer | Uncredited |
