= Nicolas Bentley =

British author and illustrator (1907–1978)

Bentley in 1953.

Nicolas Clerihew Bentley (14 June 1907 – 14 August 1978) was a British writer and illustrator, best known for his humorous cartoon drawings in books and magazines in the 1930s and 1940s. The son of Edmund Clerihew Bentley (inventor of the clerihew verse form), he was given the name Nicholas, but opted to change the spelling.

== Early career ==
Nicholas Clerihew Bentley was born on 14 June 1907 at Highgate in London. He was educated at University College School, which he left at the age of 17, having decided that his academic abilities would not take him to university. He then enrolled at Heatherleys School of Fine Art, a prestigious private college, but left after a few months. After leaving Heatherley's, Bentley worked without pay as a clown in a circus. When this job ended, he was a film extra; and during the General Strike of 1926 he worked on the London Underground.

== Professional illustration ==
Bentley later sold his first drawing to his godfather, G. K. Chesterton. He had a commission to draw illustrations for a trade newspaper called Man and his clothes in 1928, and his first regular job as an illustrator was in the publicity department of Shell. Bentley worked for Shell for three years, but disliked working in advertising. In 1930, Hilaire Belloc (who was a friend of his father) invited him to illustrate his book New Cautionary Tales. The good critical reception of this book and its illustrations allowed him to go freelance.

== Publishing career ==
As well as becoming a freelance artist, writer and journalist, Bentley also followed a career in publishing. From 1950 he was director of Andre Deutsch. He later worked as an editor for Mitchell Beazley Ltd; for Sunday Times Publications from 1962 to 1963; and for Thomas Nelson from 1963 to 1967.

== Author and illustrator ==
During the 1930s Bentley illustrated works ranging from J. B. Morton to Damon Runyon. His most famous drawings were to illustrate T. S. Eliot's Old Possum's Book of Practical Cats, but he illustrated more than 70 books in the course of a long career. He customarily used the byline "Nicolas Bentley drew the pictures". His favourite illustration work was for his own books and he considered himself primarily an author. One of his best-known books, Ready Refusals, or, The White Liar's Engagement Book gives a quotation for every day of the year, drawn from a surprisingly wide range of sources, together with an appropriate illustration. He also wrote and illustrated Golden Sovereigns – and some of lesser value – from Boadicea to Elizabeth II (1970), a humorous book about the English/British monarchy.

== Marriage ==
On 17 October 1934, he married Barbara Hastings (1908–1989), a writer of children's books and the daughter of Sir Patrick Gardiner Hastings; they had one child, Arabella, in 1943.

== Post-war work ==
Bentley had enrolled as an auxiliary fireman in 1938 and served in the London Fire Brigade during the Second World War. He illustrated How to be an Alien (1946) by George Mikes.

After the war he took a few regular cartooning jobs, including on Time and Tide (1952–54) and drawing pocket cartoons for the Daily Mail from 1958. He gave this job up in 1962, complaining that it put too much strain on him. In later life he was the illustrator for Auberon Waugh's Diary in Private Eye and contributed other cartoons to the magazine.

He moved to Downhead, near Shepton Mallet in Somerset. He died on 14 August 1978, in the Royal United Hospital, Bath, Somerset.

His autobiography, A Version of the Truth, was published in 1960. On his death, Auberon Waugh wrote in Private Eye: "Nick was a gentle, modest, humorous man, with none of the usual characteristics of the highly individual genius which inspired his quiet professionalism and supreme technical ability."

== Books written and illustrated (selected) ==
- All Fall Down (Nicholson & Watson, 1932)
- Die? I Thought I'd Laugh (Methuen, 1936)
- Ballet-Hoo (Cresset, 1937)
- Le Sport (Gollancz, 1937)
- The Tongue-Tied Canary (Joseph, 1948)
- The Floating Dutchman (1950)
- Third Party Risk (Michael Joseph, 1953)
- How can you bear to be human? (Deutsch, 1957)
- Nicholas Bentley: A Version of the Truth (Deutsch, 1960)
- Nicholas Bentley's Book of Birds (Andre Deutsch 1965)
- The Victorian Scene: 1837-1901 (Weidenfeld, 1968)
- Tales From Shakespeare (Beazley, 1972)
- Edwardian Album (Weidenfeld & Nicolson / Cardinal, 1974)
- The Dickens Index
- Tales from Shakespeare
- Inside Information – crime novel (Deutsch 1974)
- Nicolas Bentley's Book of Birds
- Second Thoughts
- case of a sharp-eyed jeweller

== Books illustrated (selected) ==
- Bentley, E. C., More Biography (Methuen, 1929)
- Belloc, H., New Cautionary Tales (Duckworth, 1930)
- Morton, J. B., The Beachcomber Omnibus (Muller, 1931)
- Belloc, H., Cautionary Verses (1940)
- Eliot, T. S., Old Possum's Book of Practical Cats (Faber, 1940)
- Queneau, Raymond, Zazie (Bodley Head, 1960) – dust jacket design only
- Southern, Terry, The Magic Christian (Deutsch, 1959) – dust jacket design only
- Duke of Bedford, John, The Duke of Bedford's Book of Snobs (Peter Owen, 1965)
