= How to be an Alien =

1946 book by George Mikes

- First edition cover
- Author: George Mikes
- Illustrator: Nicolas Bentley
- Genre: Humor
- Published: 1946

How to be an Alien is a humorous book by George Mikes, illustrated by Nicolas Bentley and published in 1946. It was Mikes' second book and is the most famous of the 44 he wrote. It is a classic of British humour and by its 32nd impression in 1966 had sold over 300,000 copies. It pokes gentle fun at the English and their relationship with foreigners, "alien" meaning in this context any non-English person. The book is characterised by much humour, affection and a total lack of rancour or bitterness. Mikes, an immigrant from Hungary, demonstrated not only his knowledge of English society but an insight into the English language.

== Synopsis ==
The book is in two parts. The first part, "How to be a General Alien", deals with such important English topics as the weather, tea, how not to be clever (since it is considered bad manners), how to compromise, and queueing (according to Mikes, the national passion). The chapter entitled "Sex" is in its entirety as follows.

Continental people have sex lives: the English have hot water bottles.

The second part, "How to be a Particular Alien", describes particular occupations from Bloomsbury intellectual to bus driver, finishing with how to be a naturalised citizen, which includes the eating of porridge for breakfast, and alleging that you like it.

Mikes subsequently wrote How to be Inimitable (1960) and How to be Decadent (1977). All three books were published in one volume in 1984 as How to be a Brit.

== Adaptations ==
A television programme based on the book, How to Be an Alien, was broadcast in 1964, featuring Frank Muir and Denis Norden, with the voices of Ronnie Barker and June Whitfield. The book was adopted for English language teaching in the Penguin Readers series.

== Editions ==
- 1946 First edition: André Deutsch (UK) hardback with illustrations by Nicolas Bentley
- 1966 Penguin Books (paperback)
- 1999 How to Be an Alien (Penguin ELT Simplified Readers: Level 3: Pre-Intermediate) (Paperback)

== Online ==
- Mikes, George. "How To Be An Alien". F2.org.
