= George Mikes =

British journalist and humourist

- Born: Mikes György; 15 February 1912; Siklós, Kingdom of Hungary, Austria-Hungary
- Died: 30 August 1987 (aged 75); London, England
- Citizenship: Hungary (until 1947); United Kingdom (from 1947)
- Education: Royal Hungarian Pázmány Péter University
- Occupations: Journalist; humourist; writer
- Spouses: Isobel Gerson (m. 1941, divorced); Lea Hanak (m. 1948; died 1986)
- Children: 2
- Writing career
- Language: Hungarian; English
- Genres: Humour; journalism
- Notable work: How to be an Alien

George Mikes (/ˈmɪkɛʃ/ MIK-esh; Hungarian: Mikes György, pronounced [ˈmikɛʃ ɟørɟ]; 15 February 1912 – 30 August 1987) was a Hungarian and British journalist, humourist and writer, best known for his humorous commentaries on various countries.

== Life and career ==
George Mikes (Hungarian: Mikes György) was born in 1912, in the small town of Siklós, in the southwest of Hungary. His father, Alfréd Mikes, was a successful lawyer, a profession he wanted his son to follow. Mikes graduated in Budapest in 1933; he studied law and received his doctorate at the Royal Hungarian Pázmány Péter University, after that he worked as a lawyer but at the same time he became a journalist and started to work for Reggel ("Morning"), a Budapest newspaper. For a short while he was the columnist of Intim Pista for Színházi Élet ("Theatre Life"), another newspaper in Budapest.

In 1938 Mikes became the London correspondent for two Hungarian newspapers, Reggel and 8 Órai Ujság ("8 o'clock News") and he worked for the former until 1940. The experience of the German Jewish refugees coming to his home in Hungary for help after 1933 had left an abiding impression upon him. So in 1938, when Mikes had originally been sent to London to cover the Munich Crisis and expected to stay for only a couple of weeks, just one year before the outbreak of World War II he decided not to return to Hungary, and instead remained in England. He worked for the BBC's Hungarian Service from 1939 onwards, interrupted only by his internment as an enemy alien on the Isle of Man in 1940.

Living in exile in England, Mikes broadcast to Hungary for the BBC during World War II, and also collaborated with the Hungarian emigration, and wrote political cabaret for the London Podium, a Hungarian theatre in London at that time, in collaboration with the Hungarian born composer Mátyás Seiber. From 1939 he also made documentaries for the BBC Hungarian section, at first as a freelance correspondent and, from 1950, as an employee. Mikes naturalised as a British subject on 16 September 1947. In 1956, he went back to Hungary to cover the Hungarian Revolution for BBC Television. His authoritative book The Hungarian Revolution was published by Andre Deutsch in 1957. From 1975 until his death on 30 August 1987 he also worked for the Hungarian section of Radio Free Europe.

He was president of the London branch of International PEN, and a member of the Garrick Club.

Mikes wrote in both Hungarian and English, for The Observer, The Times Literary Supplement, Encounter, Irodalmi Újság, Népszava, the Viennese Hungarian-language Magyar Híradó, and Világ.

His friends included the Hungarian writer Arthur Koestler, whose biography - Arthur Koestler; the story of a friendship - Mikes wrote; J. B. Priestley; academic Doireann MacDermott; and André Deutsch, whose publishing house promoted Mikes as a writer.

He married twice and had a son, Martin, by his first marriage, and a daughter, Judith, by his second. He died in London on 30 August 1987. On 15 September 1991, a memorial plaque was unveiled at his childhood home.

== Publications ==
His first book, published in 1945, was We Were There To Escape – the true story of a Jugoslav officer about life in prisoner-of-war camps. The Times Literary Supplement praised the book for the humour it showed in parts, which led him to write his most famous satiric book, How to be an Alien, which proved a great success in post-war Britain in 1946. This book poked gentle fun at the English, including a one-line chapter on sex: "Continental people have sex lives; the English have hot-water bottles." In his subsequent books Mikes blended local jokes into his own humour, dealt with (among others) Japan (The Land of the Rising Yen), Israel (Milk and Honey, The Prophet Motive), the US (How to Scrape Skies), the United Nations (How to Unite Nations), Australia (Boomerang), the British again (How to be Inimitable and How to be Decadent, both collected with How to be an Alien as How to be a Brit), and South America (How to Tango). Other subjects include God (How to be God), his cat (Tsi-Tsa), wealth (How to be Poor) and philosophy (How to be a Guru).

Apart from his commentaries, he wrote humorous fiction (Mortal Passion; The Spy Who Died of Boredom) and contributed to the satirical television series That Was the Week That Was.

He wrote his ironic autobiography with the title How to be Seventy, published in 1982.

Every now and then Mikes ventured into the territory of serious literature: his serious writing included a book about the Hungarian secret police and he narrated a BBC television report of the Hungarian Revolution of 1956.

According to Thomas Kabdebo, himself a Hungarian immigrant writer, Mikes' favourite comic device was to place himself as an inveterate yet vulnerable traveller; an ardent rationalist with European values, where he discovers national pretensions behind proud phraseology. Thus, he was able to flesh out national stereotypes with comic characteristics.

Mikes wrote over forty books, thirty-five of them humorous; however, in some way, it was a pity that his How to be an Alien was a long-lasting best seller. It pushed him into the category of critic who was viewed with benign fondness but not considered a serious thinker.

In the preface to the 24th impression of his book How to be an Alien, he reflects on the book's success:

Since then I have actually written about a dozen books but I might as well have never written anything else. I remained the author of How to be an Alien even after I had published a collection of serious essays.

== Selected bibliography ==
- How to be an Alien: a handbook for beginners and more advanced pupils (1946)
- How to Scrape Skies: the United States explored, rediscovered and explained (1948)
- Wisdom for Others (1950)
- Milk and Honey: Israel explored (1950)
- Down with everybody (1951)
- Shakespeare and Myself (1952)
- Uber Alles: Germany explored (1953)
- Little Cabbages (1955)
- Italy for Beginners (1956)
- How to Be Inimitable: coming of age in England (1960)
- How to Tango: a solo across South America (1961)
- Switzerland for Beginners (1962)
- How to Unite Nations (1963)
- Mortal Passion (1963), a novel
- Germany Laughs at Herself: German cartoons since 1848 (1965)
- Eureka!: Rummaging in Greece (1965)
- How to Be Affluent (1966)
- Boomerang: Australia Rediscovered (1968)
- The Prophet Motive: Israel today and tomorrow (1969)
- The Land of the Rising Yen: Japan (1970)
- Humour in Memoriam (1970)
- Any Souvenirs?: Central Europe revisited (1971)
- The Spy who Died of Boredom (1973)
- How to Be Decadent (1977)
- Tsi-Tsa: the biography of a cat (1978)
- English Humour for Beginners (1980)
- How to Be Seventy: an autobiography (1982)
- How to Be Poor (1983)
- How to Be a Guru (1984)
- How to Be God (1986)
- The Riches of the Poor: who's WHO (1987)

=== Non-fiction ===
- The Epic of Lofoten (1941)
- Eight humorists (1954)
- We Were There to Escape: the true story of a Jugoslav officer (1945)
- The Hungarian Revolution (1957)
- A Study in Infamy: the operations of the Hungarian Secret Police (AVO) (1959)
- Arthur Koestler; the story of a friendship (1983)

== Sources ==
- "Penguin Readers Factsheet on How to be an Alien for teachers" (PDF). Archived from the original (PDF) on 15 December 2017.
- Kabdebo, Thomas (1996). "Mikes, George". In Gale, Steven H. (ed.). Encyclopedia of British humorists: Geoffrey Chaucer to John Cleese. Vol. 1. Taylor & Francis. ISBN 0-8240-5990-5.
- Friedlander, Albert H. (23 November 2004). "Mikes, George". In Kerbel, Sorrel (ed.). The Routledge Encyclopedia of Jewish Writers of the Twentieth Century. Routledge. ISBN 0-203-01000-0.
- Fairclough, Pauline, ed. (17 February 2016). Twentieth-Century Music and Politics: Essays in Memory of Neil Edmunds. Routledge. ISBN 978-1-317-00580-3.
