= Mabel Wagnalls =

American pianist and writer

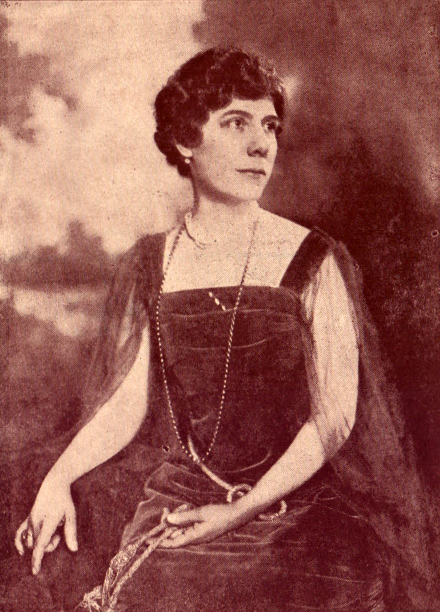
- Mabel Wagnalls (1920)
- Born: April 20, 1871; Kansas City, Missouri, U.S.
- Died: March 22, 1946 (aged 74); New York
- Other names: Mabel Wagnalls Jones
- Occupations: pianist; writer; philanthropist
- Known for: Wagnalls Memorial Library
- Notable work: The rose-bush of a thousand years

Mabel Wagnalls (after marriage, Jones; April 20, 1871 – March 22, 1946) was an American pianist and writer. She established the Wagnalls Memorial Library in honor of her parents, Adam and Anna Willis Wagnalls, as a gift to Lithopolis and Bloom Township, Ohio.

== Early life and education ==
Mabel Wagnalls was born in Kansas City, Missouri, on April 20, 1871. She was the only child of Adam and Anna Willis Wagnalls. She was a granddaughter of Christopher and Elizabeth (Snyder) Wagenhals and of Aaron and Mary (Henry) Willis, and a descendant of William Henry, only brother of Patrick Henry of Virginia. Her father was one of the original founders of Funk & Wagnalls, publishers of the Standard Dictionary.

She was educated by her mother's until 1885, when she was taken to Berlin by her mother to study piano, and was accepted at the Neue Akademie der Tonkunst. She furthered her music studies in Berlin under Franz Kullak and continued her studies in Paris and Vienna.

All through her daughter's childhood, the mother had insisted on the composition of an original essay every day. In Europe, the mother also urged a resumption of daily work with writing and encouraged the growth of imagination and fancy. Plot-sketches for stories were devised and discussed. These were crude things at first, but the mother tried to find something good in each one of them, and she encouraged the fearless unveiling in every ghost-of-an-idea. Gradually, the ideas came faster and stronger, and in time, the first story was written.

== Career ==
She made her debut as piano soloist at the Sing-Akademie zu Berlin in 1889, and her U.S. début with the Brooklyn Philharmonic orchestra of Theodore Thomas in New York City on January 11, 1891. She also played with Anton Seidl's orchestra in 1892, at the New York State Music Teachers' convention at Binghamton, New York, 1897. After touring the country performing in various concerts, she soon retired from the scene due to her fragile health. Some of her work is preserved in several records of the Welte-Mignon Autograph Piano.

The Rose-bush of a Thousand Years

After her musical career ended, she began to write, also encouraged by her mother who instilled this passion in Jones at an early age. Her first work, published in 1894, was Miserere, a story about music, so much so that it had the subtitle "a musical story". Among her other works is The Rose-bush of a Thousand Years, inspired by the Thousand-year Rose of Hildesheim Cathedral. It is the story of a young girl who abandons her child to the care of a convent; after gaining fame and notoriety, the mother has a spiritual transformation and reconnects with her son. Two silent films by director George D. Baker are based on the story: Revelation (1918), with Alla Nazimova, Charles Bryant, Frank Currier, and Revelation (1924), starring Viola Dana, Monte Blue, and Lew Cody. Her Miserere, The Palace of Danger, and The Rose-bush of a Thousand Years went into many editions in English and in foreign languages.

She was the author of several contributions on musical subjects to leading publications. Thanks to her works, Wagnalls became a close friend of William Sydney Porter, better known as O. Henry, as well as knowing many other writers, musicians and performers of the time, such as Harry Houdini and Edwin Markham.

=== Wagnalls Memorial Library ===
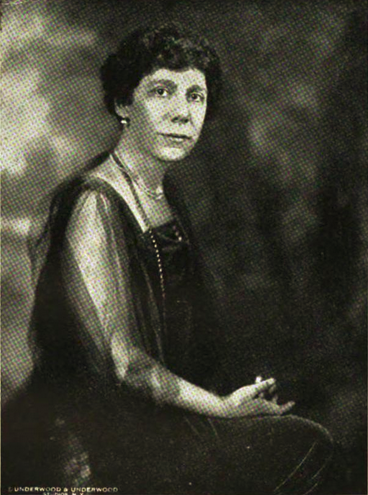
(1925)

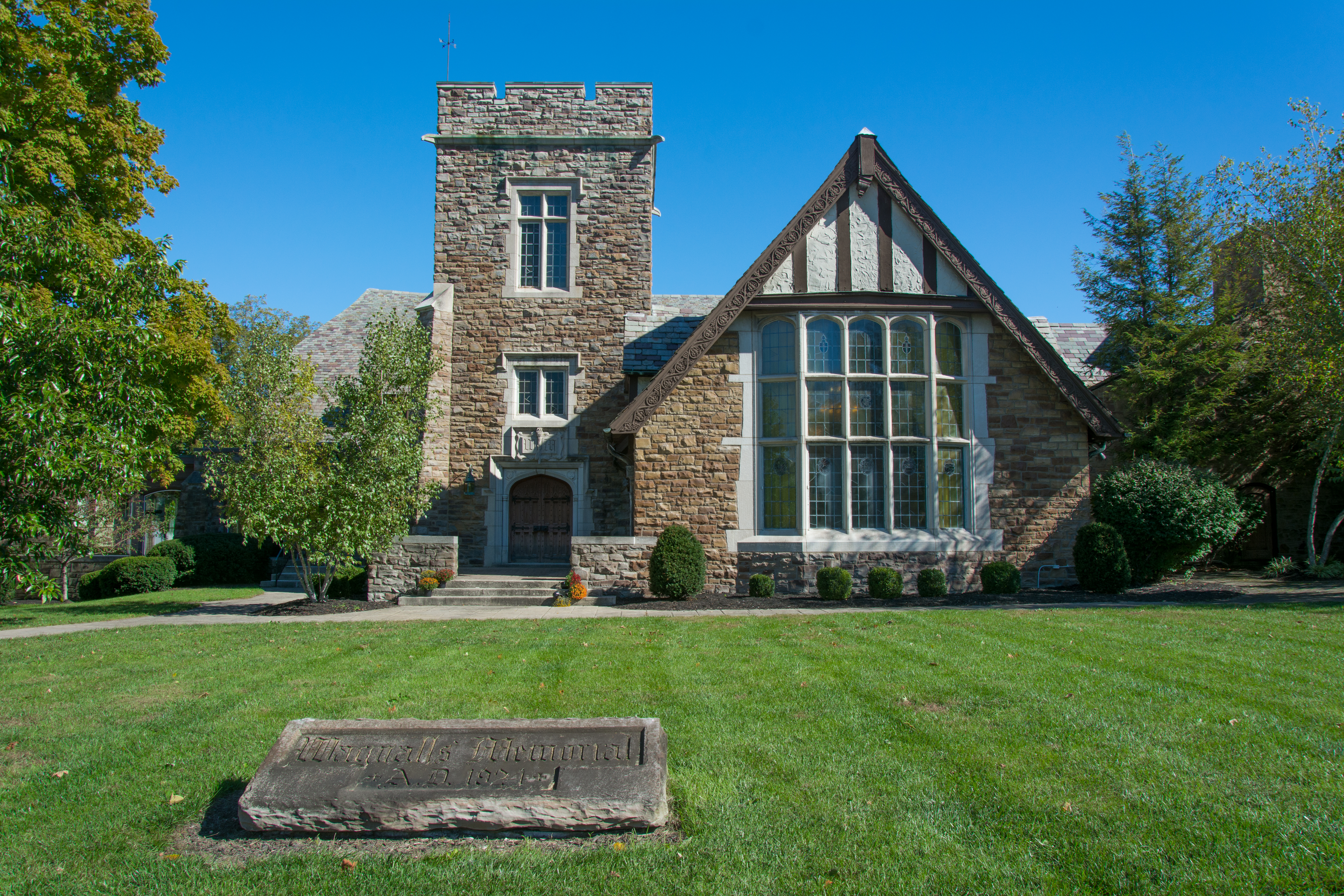
(2018)

With the support and assistance of Mabel, Adam Wagnall began construction on the Wagnalls Memorial Library, but he died in September 1924, months before its completion. In 1925, Mabel dedicated the library to her parents and gifted it to Lithopolis and Bloom Township, Ohio. A few years later, she established the Wagnalls Foundation, which maintains a close relationship with the library and is entrusted to supervise and protect the library's property and assets. The Foundation also oversees and distributes the Wagnalls College Scholarship Program that awards local graduating high school seniors and college students who meet specific requirements with tuition money for their education. This facility provides people living in the area and its visitors with a center for educational, cultural, and literary arts activities.

== Personal life ==
In 1920, Mabel Wagnalls married Richard J. Jones (died 1929), professor emeritus of law at Yale University. Mabel Wagnalls Jones died in 1946 in New York.

== Selected works ==
Stars of the Opera

- The Immortal Sinner, 1933 (text)
- The Mad-song, 1926 (text)
- The Light in the Valley: Being the Story of Anna Willis, 1925 (text)
- Letters to Lithopolis: From O. Henry to Mabel Wagnalls, 1922 (text)
- O. Henry as Letter-writer and Sketch-artist, 1922 (text)
- The Rose-bush of a Thousand Years, 1918 (text)
- The Palace of Danger: A Story of La Pompadour, 1908 (text)

- Farornas palats (The palace of danger), 1911 (text)
- Palaco de danĝero: rakonto pri Madame la Pompadour, 1926 (text)

- Stars of the Opera, 1899 (text)

- Opera and its Stars, etc. [Based on "Stars of the Opera."], 1924 (text)

- Selma the Soprano, 1898
- "Miserere: (a Musical Story)", 1894 (text)

- Miserere: rakonto muzika, 1921 (text)
