= The New International Encyclopedia =

American encyclopedia

The New International Encyclopedia is an American encyclopedia first published in 1902 by Dodd, Mead & Co. It descended from the International Cyclopaedia (1884) and was updated in 1906, 1914 and 1926.

== History ==
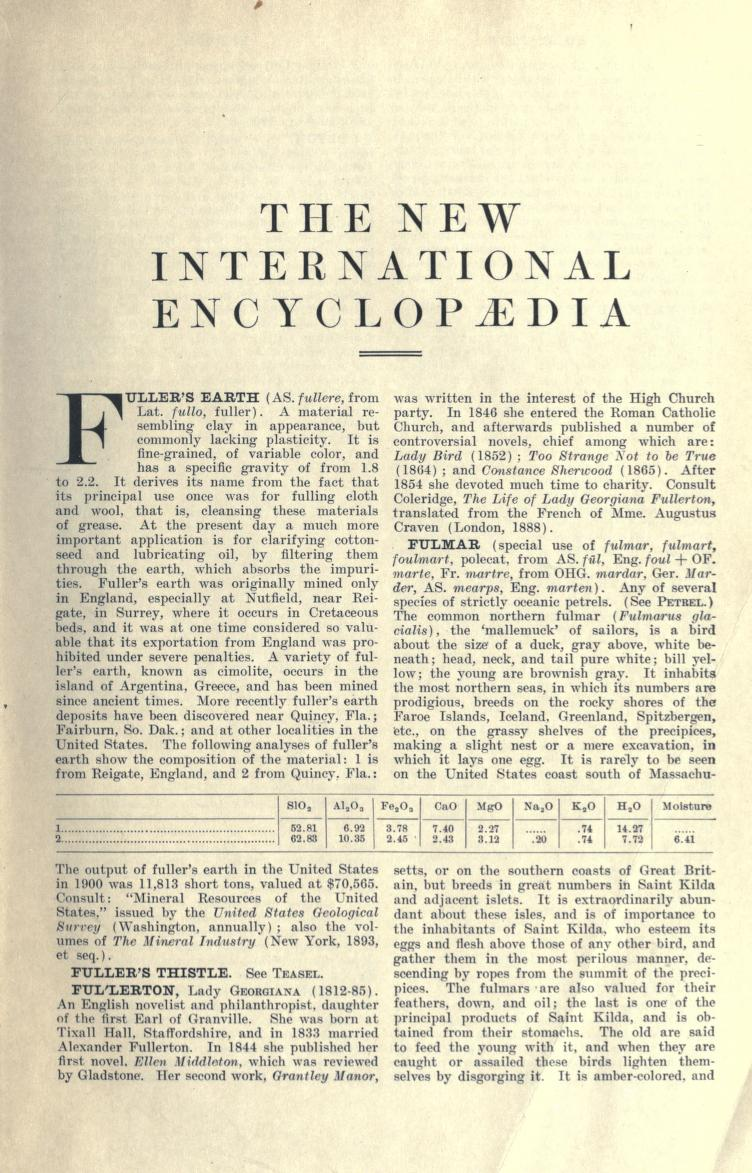
First edition, volume eight

The New International Encyclopedia was the successor of the International Cyclopaedia (1884). Initially, The International Cyclopaedia was largely a reprint of Alden's Library of Universal Knowledge, which itself was a reprint of the British Chambers's Encyclopaedia. The title was changed to The New International Encyclopedia in 1902, with editors Harry Thurston Peck, Daniel Coit Gilman and Frank Moore Colby.

The encyclopedia was popular and reprints were made in 1904, 1905, 1907 (corrected and expanded to 20 volumes), 1909 and 1911. The 2nd edition appeared from 1914 to 1917 in 24 volumes. With Peck and Gilman deceased, Colby was joined by a new editor, Talcott Williams. This edition was set up from new type and thoroughly revised. It was very strong in biography.

A third edition was published in 1923, but this was mostly a reprint with the addition of a history of the First World War in volume 24, which had previously been a reading and study guide. A two-volume supplement was published in 1925 and was incorporated into the 1927 reprint, which had 25 volumes. There was a further two-volume supplement in 1930 along with another reprint.

The final edition, in 1935, was published by Funk & Wagnalls. This edition included another updated supplement, authored by Herbert Treadwell Wade. Some material from The New International would be incorporated into future books published by Funk and Wagnalls such as Funk & Wagnalls Standard Encyclopaedia.

The 1926 material was printed in Cambridge, Massachusetts, by Yale University Press. Boston Bookbinding Company of Cambridge produced the covers. Thirteen books enclosing 23 volumes comprise the encyclopedia, which includes a supplement after Volume 23. Each book contains around 1600 pages.

Like other encyclopedias of the time, The New International had a yearly supplement, The New International Yearbook, beginning in 1908. Like the encyclopedia itself, this publication was sold to Funk and Wagnalls in 1931. It was edited by Frank Moore Colby until his death in 1925, and then by Wade. In 1937, Frank Horace Vizetelly became editor. The yearbook outlasted the parent encyclopedia, running to 1966.

More than 500 men and women submitted and composed the information contained in The New International Encyclopedia.

== Volumes ==
Gilman, Daniel Coit; Peck, Harry Thurston; Colby, Frank Moore, eds. (1905). The New International Encyclopædia. New York: Dodd, Mead and Co.
| vol | Edition | Internet Archive | Wikisource (incomplete) | Year | From | – | To | Notes |
|---|---|---|---|---|---|---|---|---|
| 1 | 1st | IA 1 | WS 1 | 1905 | A | – | Aristogoras | |
| 2 | 1st | IA 2 | WS 2 | 1905 | Aristarchus | – | Bessières | |
| 3 | 1st | IA 3 | WS 3 | 1905 | Bessus | – | Cairns | |
| 4 | 1st | IA 4 | WS 4 | 1905 | Cairo | – | Classification of Ships | |
| 5 | 1st | IA 5 | WS 5 | 1905 | Classis | – | Da Vinci | |
| 6 | 1st | IA 6 | WS 6 | 1905 | Davioud | – | Ellery | |
| 7 | 1st | IA 7 | WS 7 | 1905 | Ellesmere | – | Fontanel | |
| 8 | 1st | Not available | WS 8 | 1905 | Fontanes | – | Goethe | Alternatives: Volume VIII at HathiTrust |
| 9 | 1st | IA 9 | WS 9 | 1905 | Goethite | – | Heritable Jurisdictions | |
| 10 | 1st | IA 10 | WS 10 | 1905 | Herjulfson | – | Ishpeming | |
| 11 | 1st | IA 11 | WS 11 | 1905 | Ishtar | – | Latitudinarians | |
| 12 | 1st | IA 12 | WS 12 | 1905 | Latium | – | Manna | |
| 13 | 1st | IA 13 | WS 13 | 1905 | Manna-Croup | – | Morganatic Marriage | |
| 14 | 1st | IA 14 | WS 14 | 1905 | Morgan City | – | Omul | |
| 15 | 1st | IA 15 | WS 15 | 1905 | Ona | – | Pickering | The Internet Archive edition is missing pp. 6-7, but see the 1906 volume for the first edition at Google Books, which appears to be about the same thing, and does have these pages. |
| 16 | 1st | IA 16 | WS 16 | 1905 | Pickersgill | – | Reid | |
| 17 | 1st | IA 17 | WS 17 | 1905 | Reifferscheid | – | Servian Wall | |
| 18 | 1st | IA 18 | WS 18 | 1905 | Service-berry | – | Tagus | |
| 19 | 1st | IA 19 | WS 19 | 1905 | Taharka | – | Vampire | |
| 20 | 1st | IA 20 | WS 20 | 1905 | Van | – | Zyrians | |

- 2nd ed. at Princeton (1914-16; complete) on the HathiTrust website

New International Encyclopedia (incomplete)
| Volume | Edition | Year | copyright last | From | – | To |
|---|---|---|---|---|---|---|
| Volume 3 | 2nd | 1928 | [1924] | Bazaine | – | Brock |
| Volume 4 | 2nd | 1928 | [1924] | Brockelmann | – | Chaeremon |
| Volume 5 | 2nd | 1914 | | Chæronia | – | Consuelo |
| Volume 6 | 2nd | 1928 | | Consul | – | Didymograptus |
| Volume 8 | 2nd | | [1922] | Enteritis | – | Foraker |
| Volume 10 | 2nd | 1928 | [1922] | Glacial | – | Havre de Grace |
| Volume 12 | 2nd | 1915 | | Imaginary | – | Jouy |
| Volume 13 | 2nd | 1915 | [1915] | Jovanovich | – | Leprohon |
| Volume 17 | 2nd | 1916 | | Newfoundland | – | Panjab |
| Volume 18 | 2nd | 1916 | | Panjabi | – | Poliziano |
| Volume 19 | 2nd | 1916 | [1916] | Polk | – | Rigging |
| Volume 20 | 2nd | 1916 | [1916] | Riggs | – | Shilluck |
| Volume 21 | 2nd | 1916 | | Shiloh | – | Tarsus |
| Volume 22 | 2nd | 1916 | | Tartaglia | – | Valiant |
| Volume 24 | Sup | 1930 | 1930 | Abbe | – | Lyons |
| Volume 25 | Sup | 1930 | [1930] | Municipal | – | Zweig |
