= Wagnalls Memorial Library =

American public library in Lithopolis, Ohio

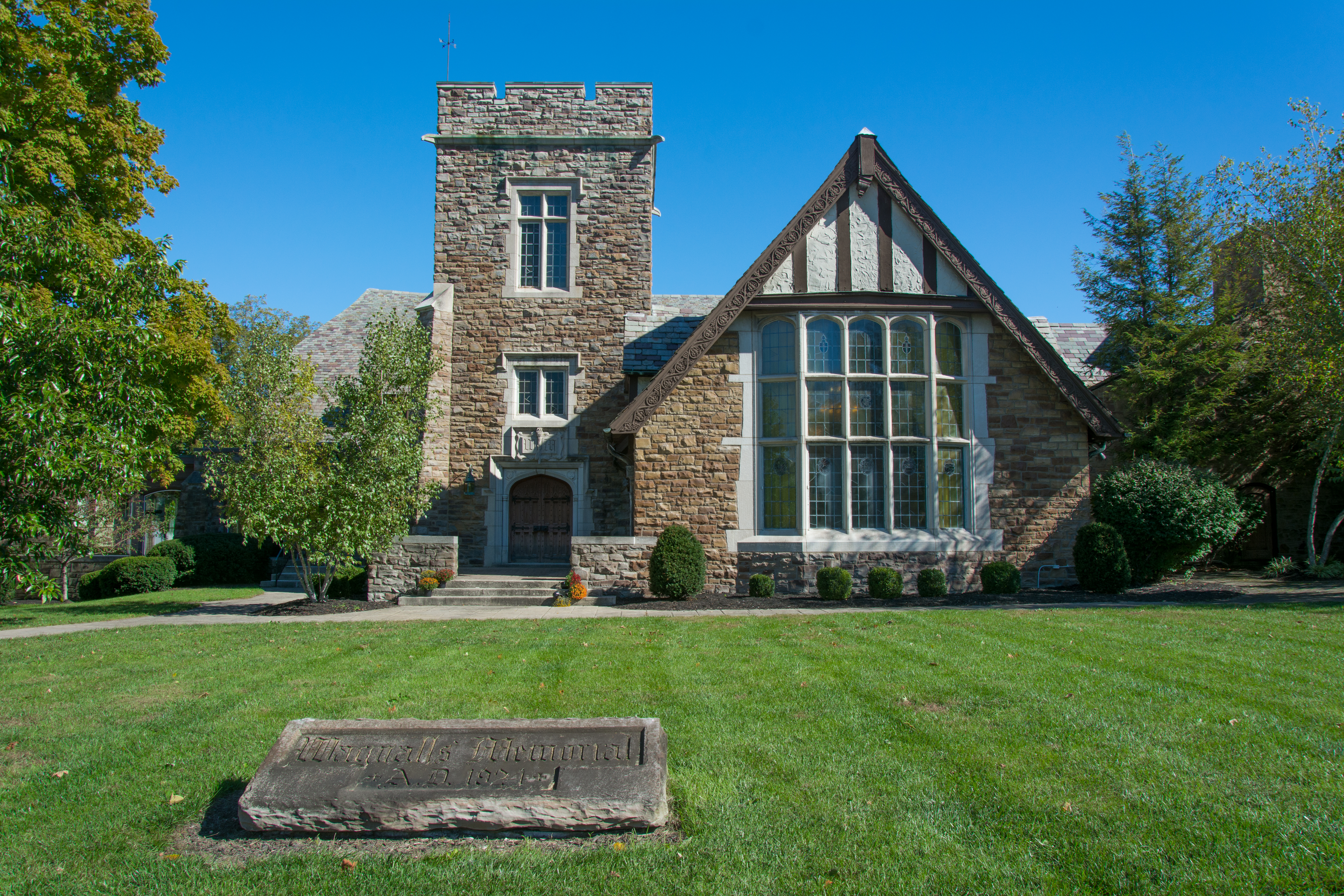
- (2018)
- Location: Lithopolis, Ohio, U.S.
- Type: Privately-established public library
- Established: 1925
- Architect: Ray Sims

Other information
- Website: www.wagnallslibrary.org

Wagnalls Memorial Library is an American public library in Lithopolis, Ohio. Dedicated by Mabel Wagnalls Jones in the memory of her parents, Adam and Anna Willis Wagnalls, who were both born in Lithopolis, Mabel gifted it to the perpetual use of the people of Lithopolis and Bloom Township, Fairfield County, Ohio.

== History ==
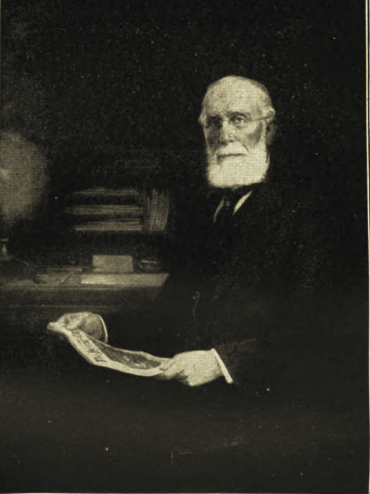
Adam Wagnalls

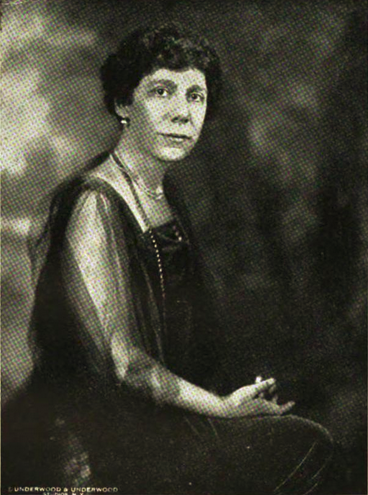
Mabel Wagnalls Jones

Mabel Wagnalls never forgot the modest village where her parents were born - Lithopolis, Ohio. It was her desire to build a memorial there that might testify to the people of this town her parents' interest in their welfare and her mother's desire to afford to others opportunities for education and culture that she did not have in her childhood.

Completed in 1925, Mabel dedicated the Memorial to the town of Lithopolis in honor of her parents, Adam and Anna Willis Wagnall. The building and its contents were gifted to the perpetual use of the people of Lithopolis and Bloom Township, Fairfield County. It was free from all encumbrances. An ample endowment provided for its maintenance. It imposed no financial obligation upon the local community or the state. until it started receiving public library funds from the state in 2004.

In the 1920s, Bloom Township school officials eliminated reading of the prescribed pupils' reading circle books from the course because of the great abundance of children's books that the library furnishes. The educational influence was evidenced in the growing ease and familiarity with which students made their selections, observed the rules in their behavior, and adapted themselves to the regulations of a well-ordered library.

== Architecture and fittings ==
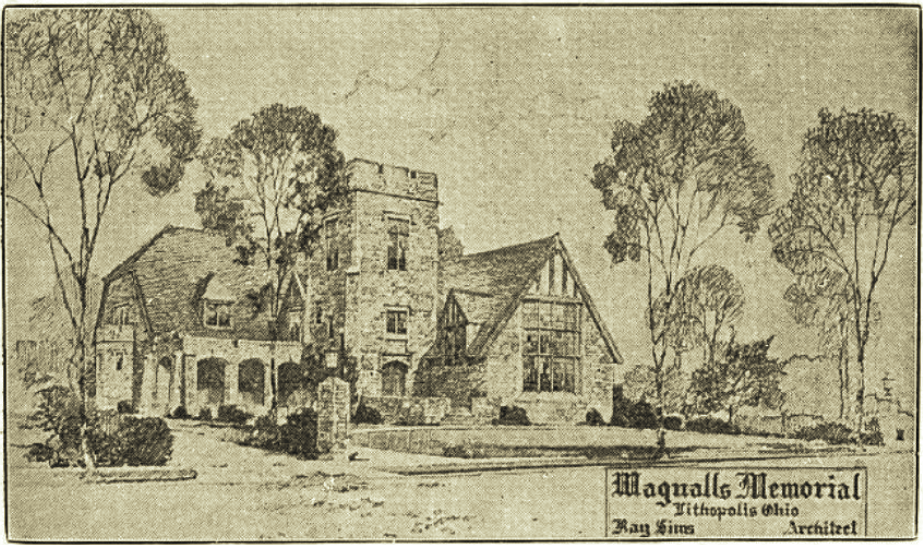
Architectural rendition

The building was designed by Ray Sims. It is of Tudor-Gothic architecture, constructed of native Lithopolis freestone. The cost was US$500,000.

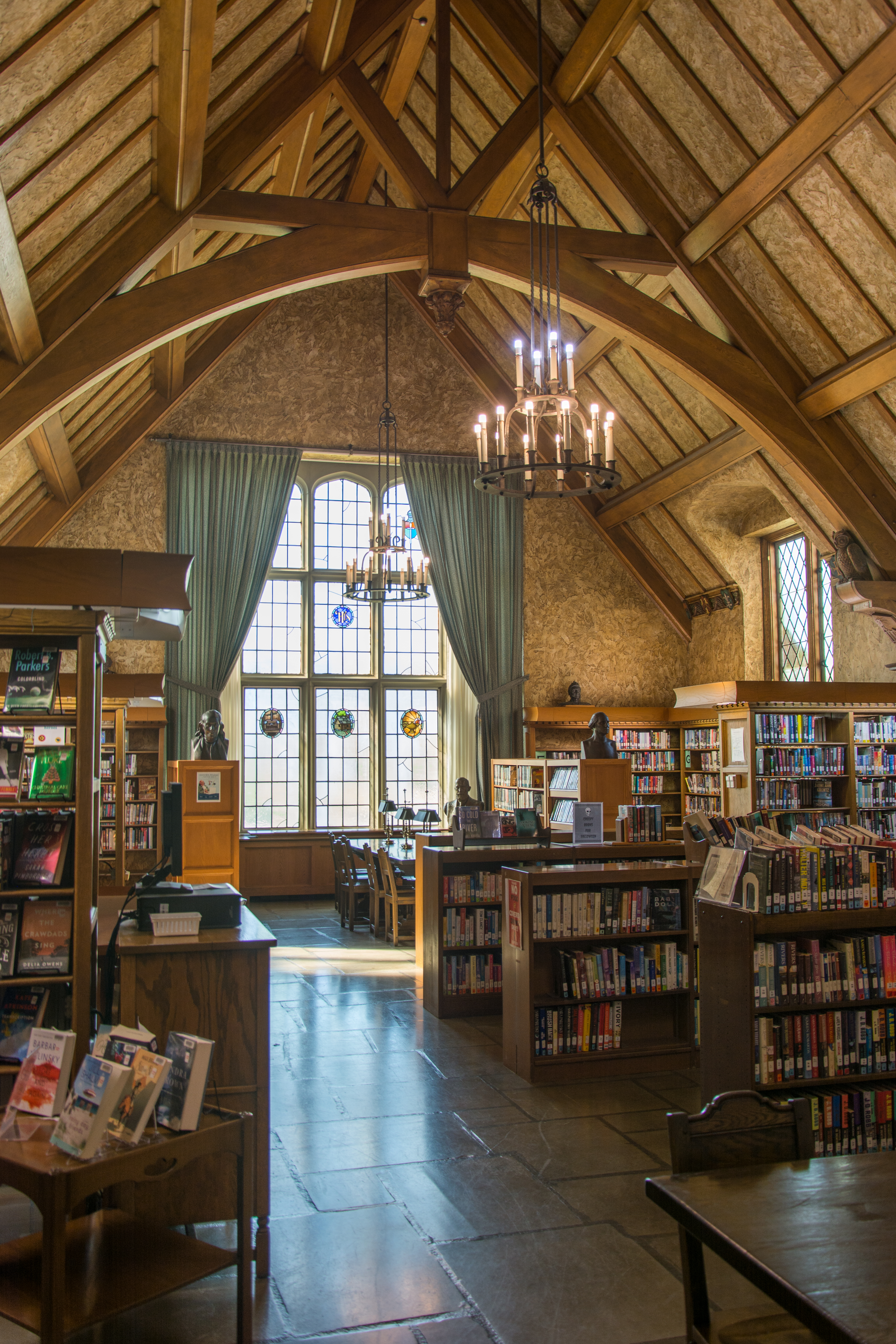
Reading room

Initially, the library held 2,000 volumes with shelving space for about 20,000 volumes. Paintings of Anna and Adam Wagnalls adorn the walls. Massive oak tables, comfortable chairs, restful furnishings and artistic decorations are part of the reading room.

The Memorial contains paintings, valuable manuscripts, and autograph letters from people eminent in various fields of activity. The collection of O. Henry letters, reproduced in Letters to Lithopolis, from O. Henry to Mabel Wagnalls, are permanently preserved there. The manuscript collection left by Mr. Wagnalls was also permanently preserved in the tower. The four walls of the Edwin Markham room were covered with framed manuscripts of him. Another room in the tower honors John Ward Dunsmore.

The Memorial's theater has a seating capacity of 350 chairs. The massive oak-beamed ceilings, mellow-toned walls, and lit interior provide a setting for the stage. The rostrum is high, overlooking the organ console, with a large Welte Philharmonic reproducing pipe organ. The proscenium arch is a work of stucco, resembling carved oak. Curtains, floor covering, and walls are in brown and tan. The reproducing grand piano occupied the central right side, with antique furnishings to complete the setting. On the rear wall Mozart at the piano, a painting by Dunsmore, was flanked on either side by tall torchieres. A film projection room is in the rear of the theater.

The basement houses a large social room, equipped with tables, chairs, 200 place settings of china, kitchen and accessories for the holding of community social meetings.
