= Charlie Brown's Super Book of Questions and Answers =

Book series by Charles Schulz

- The front cover of the first volume.
- Author: Charles M. Schulz
- Language: English
- Genre: Encyclopedia
- Publisher: Random House Children's Books
- Publication date: October 1976 – September 1981
- Publication place: United States
- Media type: Print (hardcover)
- Pages: 145 pp
- ISBN: 978-0-394-83491-7
- OCLC: 2965340
- Dewey Decimal: 500.1
- LC Class: QH48 .C49

Charlie Brown's Super Book of Questions and Answers is a series of encyclopedia-like books that feature comic strips and art from the comic strip Peanuts. Five volumes were published between 1976 and 1981.

== Summary ==
The content is presented as a series of questions pertaining to the subject of the particular chapter of the books. Amid the questions, pictures and photographs, there are details from established comic strips and complete comic strips, occasionally with its dialogue adjusted to the chapter's theme.

=== Volume One: About All Kinds of Animals – from Snails to Humans! (Oct 1976) ===
Encyclopedic facts about animals.

=== Volume Two: About the Earth and Space – from Plants to Planets! (Sept 1977) ===
Encyclopedic facts about the Earth and the Solar System.

=== Volume Three: About Planes, Cars and Trains and Other Things That Move! (Nov 1978) ===
Encyclopedic facts about motion and mechanics.

=== Volume Four: About All Kinds of People and How They Live! (Nov 1979) ===
Charlie Brown and friends present, in question-and-answer format, information about cultures and customs throughout the world.

=== Volume Five: About All Kinds of Things and How They Work! (Sept 1981) ===
Charlie Brown and the rest of the Peanuts gang help present a host of facts about a wide variety of machines in a question and answer format.

== Reuse of material ==
The material from these books formed the basis for Charlie Brown's Cyclopedia, a 15-volume set published by Funk & Wagnalls in 1980–1981. A second edition of Charlie Brown's Cyclopedia was published in 1990.
