= Frank Horace Vizetelly =

English-American lexicographer, etymologist and editor

Frank Horace Vizetelly in 1925

Francis Horace Vizetelly (2 April 1864 – 20 December 1938) was an English-American lexicographer, etymologist, and editor.

== Life ==
Vizetelly was born in England, United Kingdom, the only son of Henry Vizetelly and his second wife, Elizabeth Anne Ansell. His half-brother was Ernest Alfred Vizetelly (1853–1922). After an education in France and England, he joined his father's publishing house in 1882; the firm and his father were eventually ruined by convictions for obscenity resulting from the publication of the novels of Émile Zola.

He moved to New York in 1891, eventually becoming naturalized as a citizen of the United States. The publishers Funk & Wagnalls employed him along with Calvin Thomas, beginning on the Isaac K. Funk's editorial staff compiling A Standard Dictionary of the English Language. He continued to act as an editor for the firm's dictionaries and encyclopedia, and had a column in their Literary Digest known as "The Lexicographer's Easy Chair."

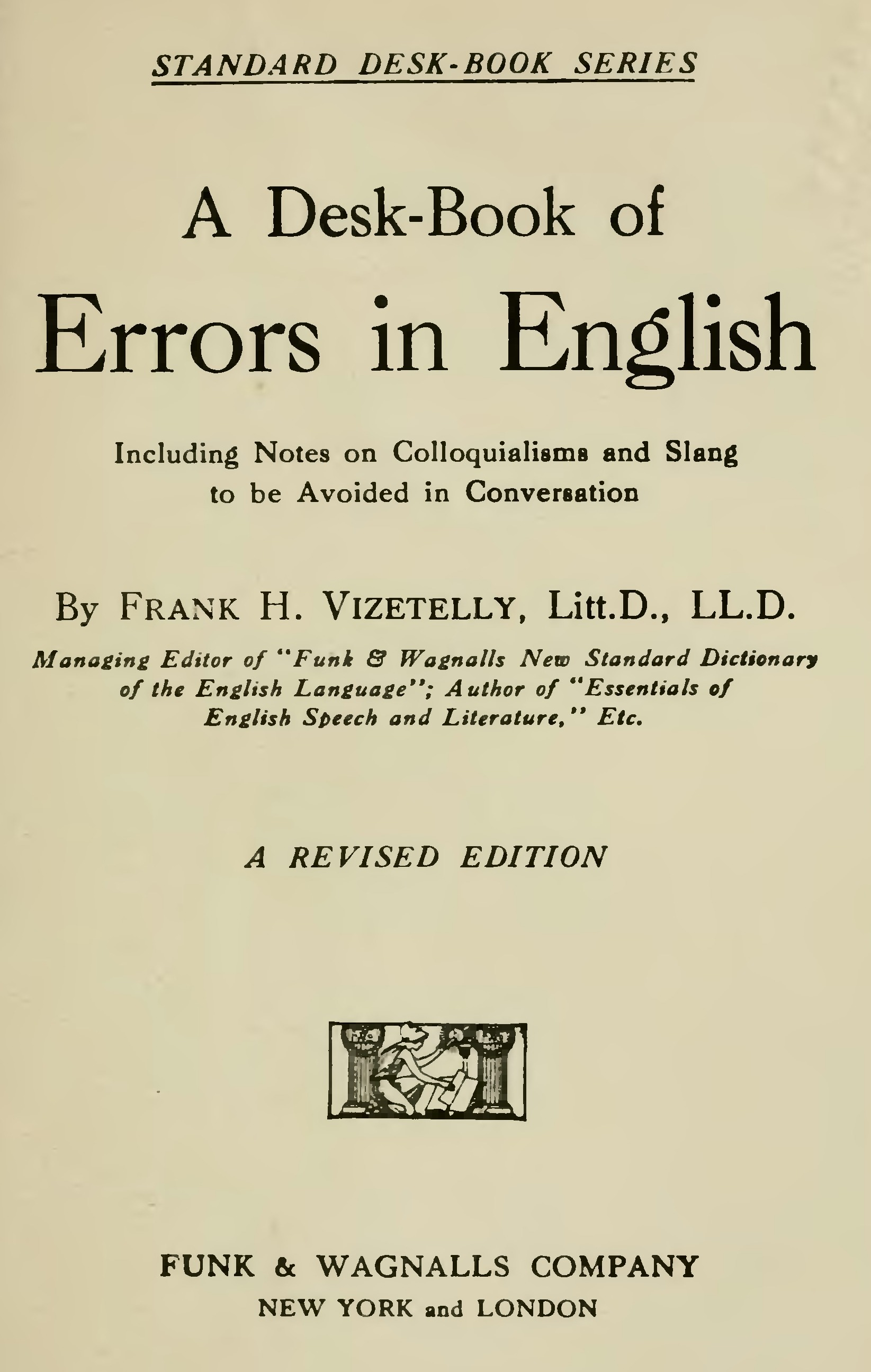
A Desk-Book of Errors in English authored by Frank H. Vizetelly

He died in 1938, being interred at New York's Woodlawn Cemetery.

== Works ==
Vizetelly was the author of more than 200 works, which touched upon the broad range of subjects, from the humanities to sciences, revealing his intellectual prowess. However, his abiding interest was in literary and lexical fields, and he was frequently engaged in determining the origins and emergence of words in the English language. Vizetelly left a legacy of preserving and refining both written and spoken English and did not hesitate to invoke the authority of William Shakespeare to warn against the misuse of English language, "Slovenly speech is as clearly an indication of slovenly thought as profanity is of a degraded mind. Therefore, let us heed the advice Shakespeare has given us – 'Mend your speech lest it may mar your fortune'." [cf. King Lear Act 1, Scene 1, Lines 94-5]
