= Norman Lewis =

Norman Lewis may refer to:

- Norman Lewis (writer) (1908–2003), British writer
- Norman Lewis (grammarian) (1912–2006), American author
- Norman Lewis (artist) (1909–1979), African-American painter, scholar, and teacher
- Norman Lewis (fencer) (1915–2006), American Olympic fencer
- Norman Lewis (footballer) (1908–1972), English footballer
- Norman Lewis (boxer) (1923–1981), Welsh boxer on the list of Welsh boxing champions
- Norman Lewis (tennis) British tennis player of the 1940s and 1950s
- Norman Lewis del Alcázar, member of the Peruvian Congress 2011–2016

== See also ==
- Norm Lewis, American actor and baritone singer
