= Calvin Thomas (linguist) =

American scholar (1854–1919)

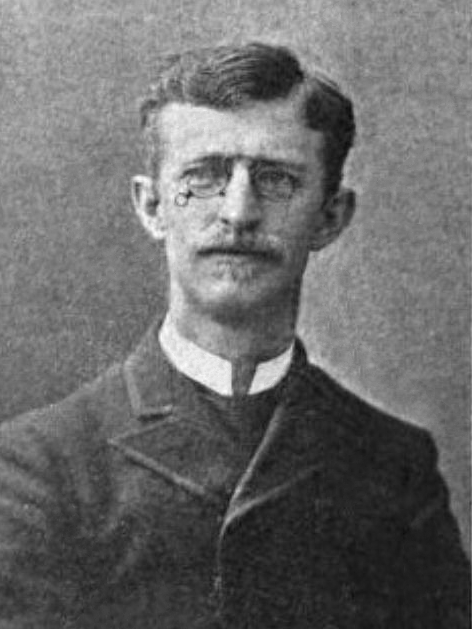
Calvin Thomas c. 1925

Calvin Thomas (October 28, 1854 near Lapeer, Michigan – November 4, 1919 in New York City) was an American scholar who served as professor of Germanic languages and literature at the University of Michigan and Columbia University.

== Biography ==
Thomas graduated from the University of Michigan in 1874 with a Bachelor of Arts. He taught Latin and Greek at the Grand Rapids High School for a while, after which he studied philology at the University of Leipzig in Germany in 1877/1878. His studies ended abruptly when he responded to a request from the University of Michigan to return and teach German. In 1886, he became professor of Germanic languages at Michigan. In 1896, he moved to fill the same chair at Columbia University.

Professor Thomas did much to introduce the study of German into US public schools. He was president of the Modern Language Association of America from 1896 to 1897, and of the American Dialect Society from 1912 to 1913. He was also involved in the simplified spelling movement and was chair of Theodore Roosevelt's Simplified Spelling Board. The University of Michigan gave him an LL.D. in 1904. In addition, he was an editor and contributing editor, along with Frank Horace Vizetelly, of the Funk and Wagnalls Encyclopedia and Dictionary in the early 20th century.

After his first wife, Mary J. Sutton of Lapeer, died the year they were married (1880), he married Mary Eleanor Allen of Grand Rapids in 1884. They had two children.

== Publications ==
- A Practical German Grammar (1895; fourth edition, revised, 1905)
- Goethe and the Conduct of Life (1886)
- The Life and Works of Schiller (1901)
- A History of German Literature (1909)
- An Anthology of German Literature (1909)
- Report of the Committee of Twelve of the Modern Language Association of America (1910)
- Goethe (1917)
- Scholarship, and Other Essays, a selection of his work published posthumously by his colleagues (1924)

Thomas edited Faust (part i, 1892; part ii, 1897), Hermann und Dorothea (1891), Torquato Tasso (1888), and An Anthology of German Literature.
