= Thousand-year Rose =

Rose bush at Hildesheim Cathedral in Germany

Coordinates: 52°08′56.7″N 09°56′51.2″E

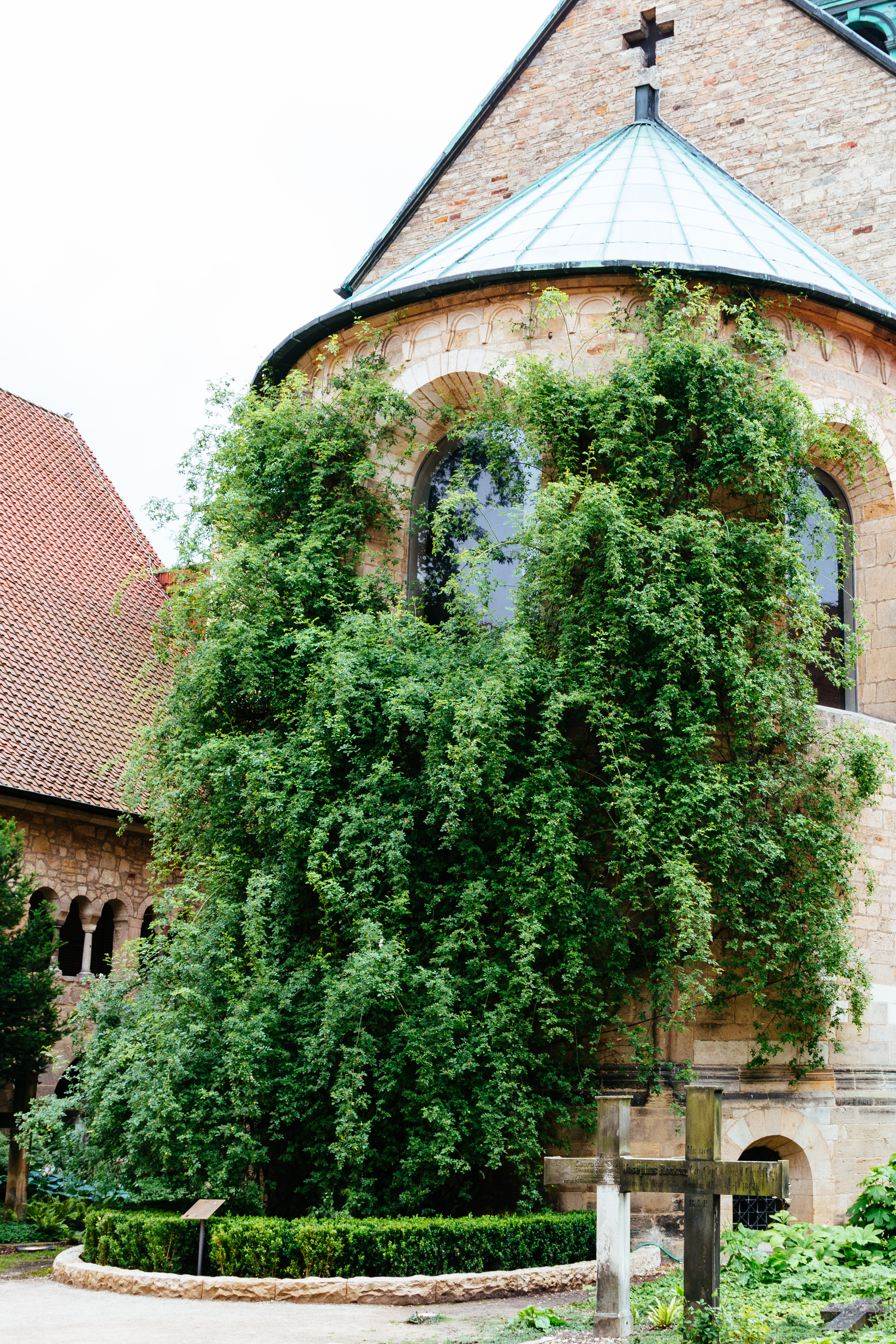
The Rose of Hildesheim climbs on the apse of Hildesheim Cathedral.

The Thousand-year Rose (German: Tausendjähriger Rosenstock, lit. 'Thousand-year-old Rosebush'), also known as the Rose of Hildesheim, grows on the apse of the Hildesheim Cathedral, a Catholic cathedral in Hildesheim, Germany, that is dedicated to the Assumption of Mary. The cathedral and the adjacent St. Michael's Church have been on the UNESCO list of World Heritage Sites since 1985.

The rose that climbs on the wall of the cathedral's apse is believed to be the oldest living rose in the world. A wild dog rose (Rosa canina), it grows against the eastern apse of the cathedral, which is around 21 m (69 ft) high and 9 m (30 ft) wide. The rose bush reaches a height of around 10 m (33 ft) and documentation verifies its age at around 700 years. Slight variations arise in the tale of the establishment of the diocese by King Louis the Pious at Hildesheim in 815 but the rose bush is a common theme in all versions. According to legend, while the rose bush flourishes, Hildesheim will prosper.

A poem about the rose was published in 1896. In the early twentieth century, after visiting the cathedral and seeing the rose, author Mabel Wagnalls was inspired to write a book, which went on to form the basis of a silent film.

== Rose ==
The rose at Hildesheim is a Rosa canina, also called a dog rose. According to legend, it dates back to the establishment of the diocese of Hildesheim, around 815. The buildings were constructed around the area in which the rose was growing.

Dog roses, the Caninae section of the genus Rosa, have around 20–30 species and subspecies, which appear in a variety of shapes and occur mostly in northern and central Europe. The rose that grows on the Saint Mary Cathedral belongs to the Rosa canina and it shows the specific features of a canina, being a deciduous shrub normally ranging in height from 1 to 3 m (3 ft 3 in to 9 ft 10 in); however occasionally it can climb if given support. The stems are covered with small, sharp, hooked spines to assist it in climbing. The leaves have between five and seven leaflets. The flowers are usually pale pink, fragrant, 4 to 6 cm (1.6 to 2.4 in) in diameter with five petals, and develop into oval 1.5–2 cm (0.59–0.79 in) red-orange coloured hips. The fruit is noted for its high vitamin C level and is used to make tea and marmalade. The rose hips are used in traditional folk medicine as a remedy for inflammatory-related diseases.

In traditional Austrian folk medicine the rose hips have been used to make a tea for treatment of viral infections and disorders of the kidneys and urinary tract. The mature rose is also attractive to wildlife, various insects and serves as a shelter for nesting birds. The birds eat the hips in the winter.

The rose blossoms usually survive for around a fortnight and appear toward the end of May but this can vary slightly according to weather conditions. The flowers have a pale, very light pink colour with a slight white colouring in the middle and they are of a medium size. The flowers have a rather light fragrance. The five petals of the flowers are weakly undulated. The leaves are shiny dark-green on the upper side and hairless on the underside. The rose hips are oval and quite elongated and of a bright medium reddish colouring. The thorns are of medium density and size.

In 1945 during the Second World War Allied bombs devastated the cathedral, but the rose bush survived. The parts of the plant above the ground were damaged but the roots survived beneath the ruins, and the hardy rose regrew and blossomed again.

Not all roses are so durable; the longest living rose bushes are mostly categorized as wild roses. Garden roses and other rose cultivars may have a much shorter lifespan of only a couple of hundred years. The tea rose has the shortest lifespan: it might not survive more than thirty to fifty years.

Rosa canina of the same type as the Hildesheim Rose
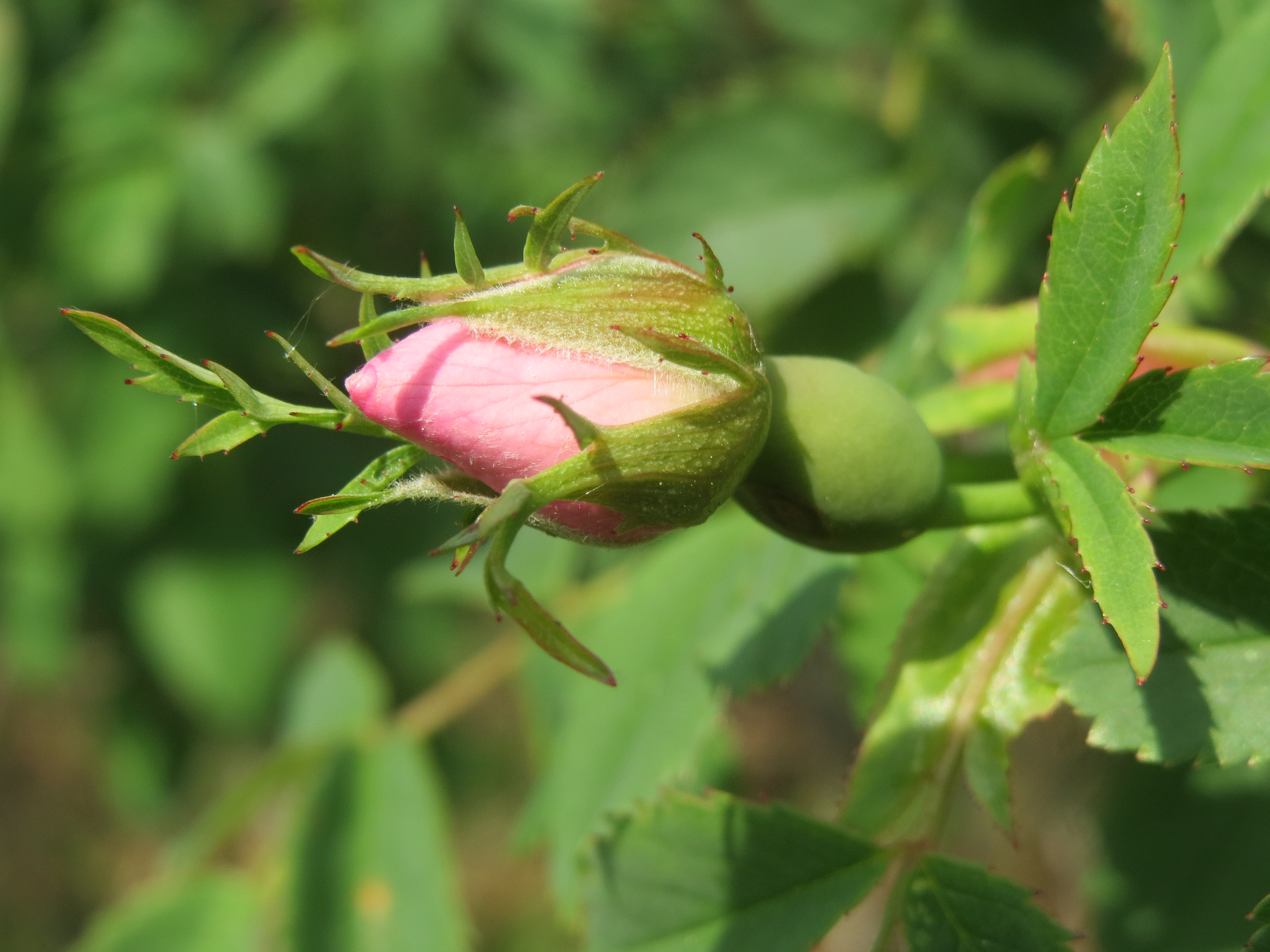

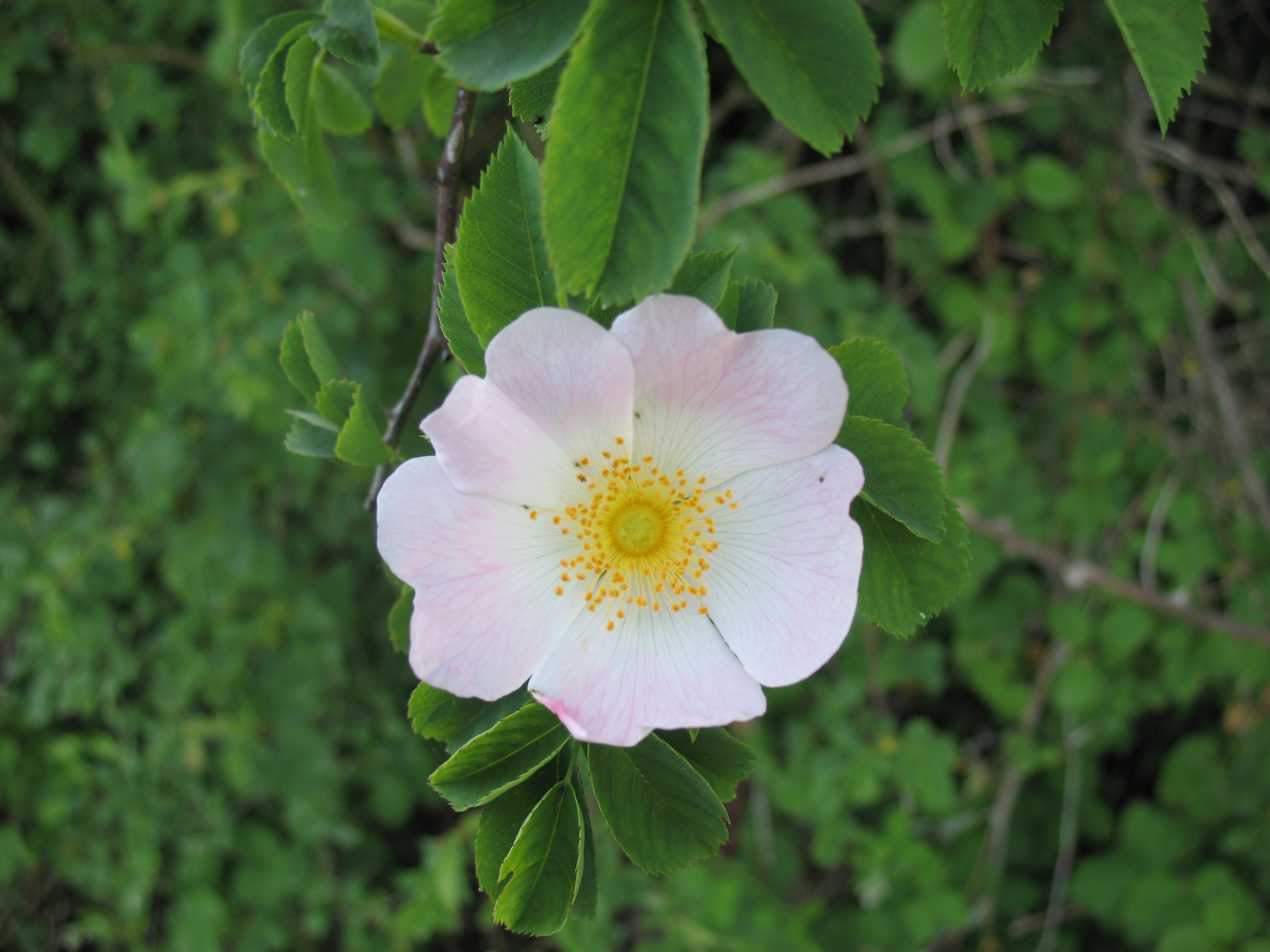

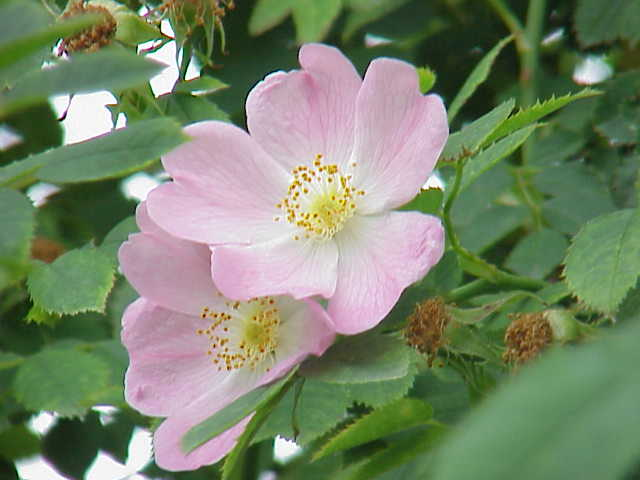

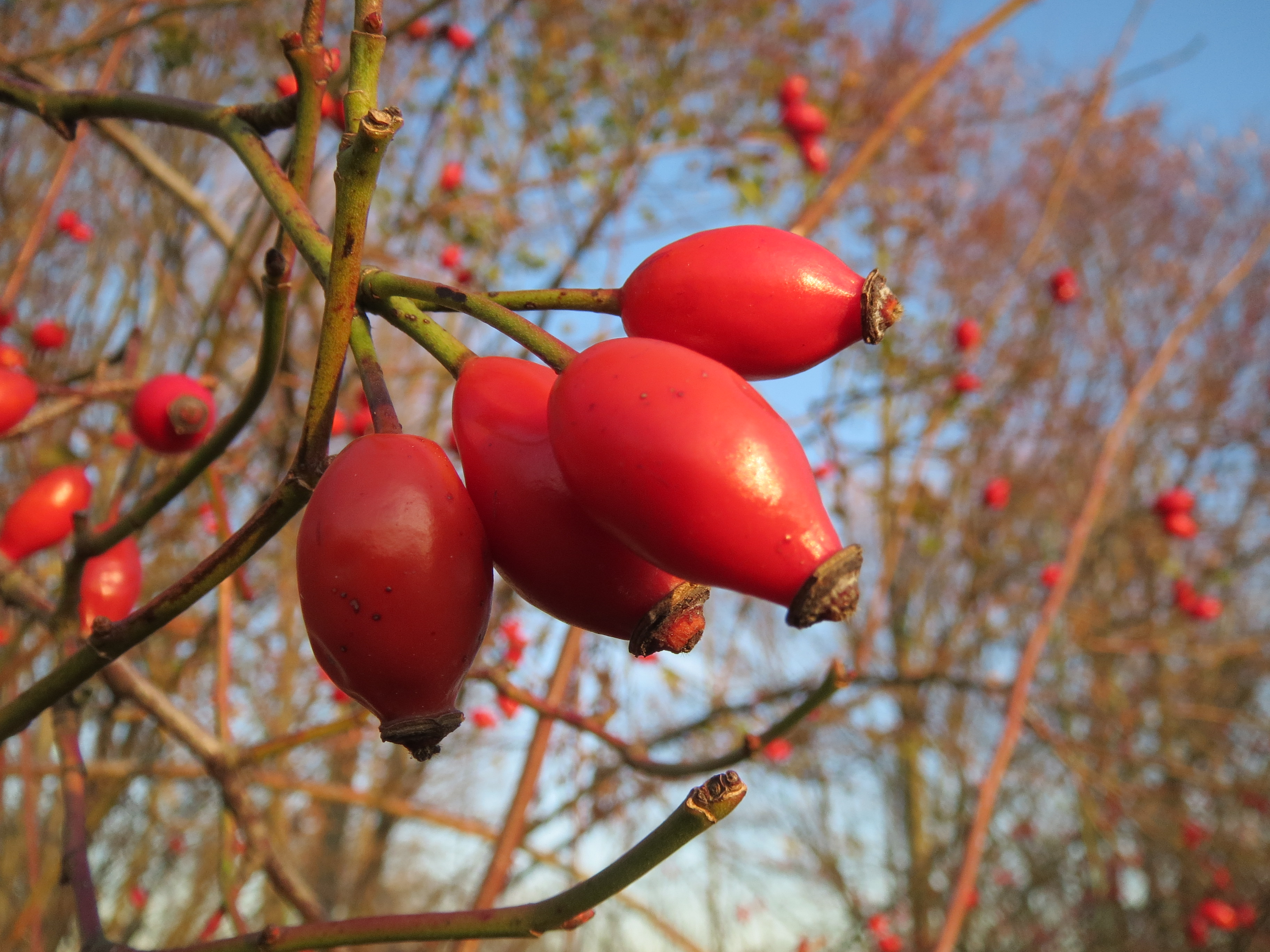

== History of the settings ==
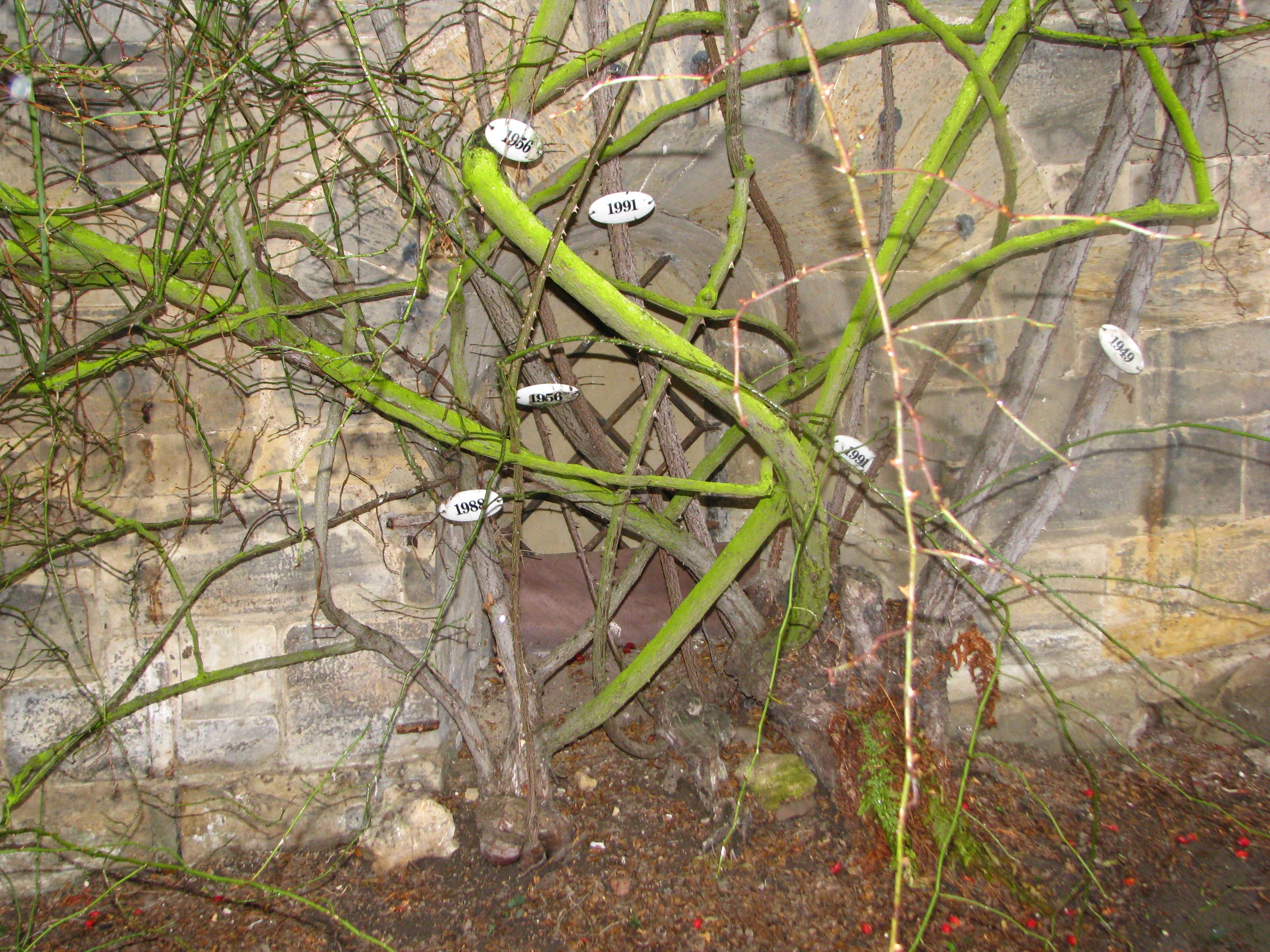
The different branches marked

After the Duchy of Saxony had been conquered by the Frankish Kingdom, Emperor Charlemagne in 800 founded a missionary diocese at his Eastphalian court in Elze (Aula Caesaris), a town in the district of Hildesheim, in Lower Saxony, Germany, about 19 km (12 mi) west of Hildesheim. He dedicated the missionary diocese to Saints Peter and Paul; it became the origin of the Bishopric of Hildesheim. His son, King Louis the Pious, relocated the episcopal bishopric to Hildesheim in 815, dedicated to the Assumption of Mary, which is celebrated on 15 August.

Thus, Hildesheim, one of the oldest cities in Northern Germany, became the seat of the Bishopric of Hildesheim in 815. The settlement with the cathedral developed quickly into a town which was given market rights by King Otto III in 983.

About fifty years after the diocese's establishment, the first large cathedral was ready. During this time a monastery was also built by the Benedictine monk Saint Altfrid or Altfrid of Hildesheim, who became Bishop of Hildesheim and founded Essen Abbey, mentioned by the Hildesheim Chronicle.

== Legend ==
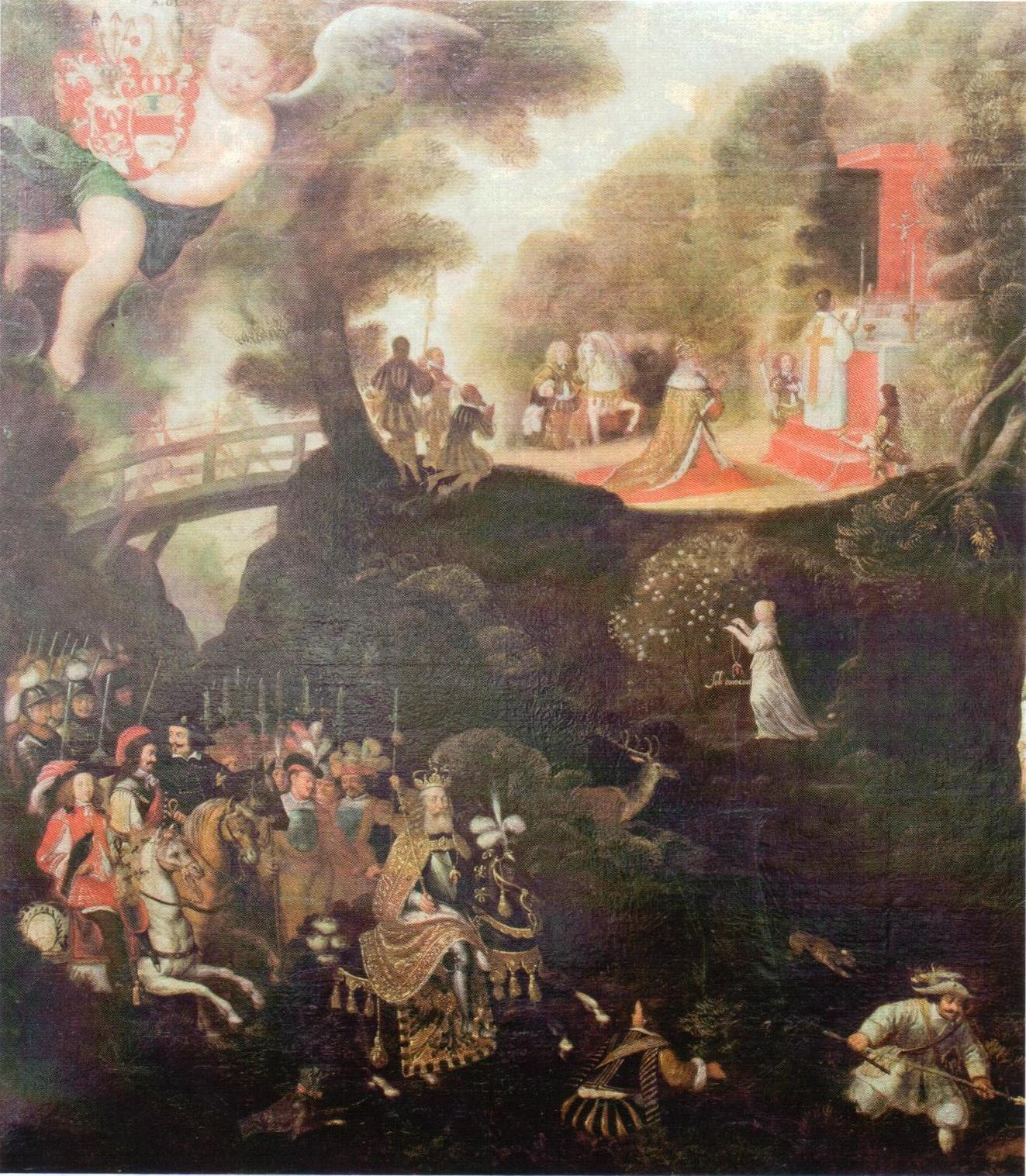
Painting by an anonymous artist from 1652 illustrating the founding legend of the cathedral; it is held by the Hildesheim Cathedral Museum.

In 1909, in his book Romantic Germany, Robert Schauffler tells the legend of the rose. In 815 Emperor Louis the Pious (778–840), son of Charlemagne, was hunting in the Hercynian Forest. While he was hunting a white buck, he became separated from his fellow hunters and lost his game and horse. He tried to summon help with his hunting-horn, but nobody answered the call. Disoriented and alone, he swam across the Innerste river then walked all day until he arrived at a mound covered with a wild rose, the symbol of the old Saxon goddess Hulda. The Emperor had a reliquary containing relics of the Virgin Mary over which he prayed for rescue until he fell asleep.

When he woke up, the mound was covered with glittering white snow despite it being the middle of summer. The bush was in full bloom, the grass was lush and the trees were covered in leaves. He looked for his reliquary and saw it was covered in ice between the branches of the rose-bush. The Emperor's interpretation of this miracle was that the goddess was sending him a sign by "shaking her bed" that the Virgin should in future be venerated instead of her. Hulda is depicted as a maiden in snow-white clothes – she is the protector of women's crafts but also associated with wilderness and winter – when it snows, it is said that Hulda is shaking out her feather pillow. When his followers finally found the Emperor he pledged that he would construct a cathedral to honour the Virgin where the mound with the rose was. He did spare the rose, and built the cathedral in a way that the rose is growing now behind the altar in the apse. More than a thousand years later, the same rose bush still blossoms.

According to a different version of the legend, the German emperor Louis the Pious lost his cherished reliquary while chasing game and promised that he would erect a chapel wherever it was discovered. The reliquary was found on the branches of a wild rose and the Emperor constructed the sanctuary beside the rose, with the altar close to the site where the rose was growing.

Another slight variation to the legend is given in Fundatio Ecclesiae Hildensemens, an 11th-century publication. The Emperor had taken the reliquary to use when he stopped to say Mass while out hunting. The artefact was placed in a tree while the sermon was undertaken but not retrieved when the hunt resumed. Later a chaplain was unable to remove the reliquary from the branches. Believing this to be a symbol of God's will, the Emperor had a church constructed there instead of as originally planned at Elze.

== Film and literature ==
One of the first printed works by Jessie Weston was a lengthy sentimental verse called The Rose-Tree of Hildesheim. A narrative about "sacrifice and denial", it was modelled on the story of the rose. Published in 1896, it was the title verse in an omnibus of her poems.

Inspiration for the book entitled The Rose-bush of a Thousand Years came from the rose at Hildesheim. Written by Mabel Wagnalls and published in 1918, it is a tale about a young girl abandoning her baby to the care of a convent. The mother later gains notoriety, has a "spiritual transformation" and rekindles a relationship with her child. The story went on to form the basis for the 1924 silent film Revelation. The ninety-minute film starred Viola Dana, Monte Blue and Lew Cody. It was written and directed by George D. Baker.

== Gallery ==
The Hildesheim Rose
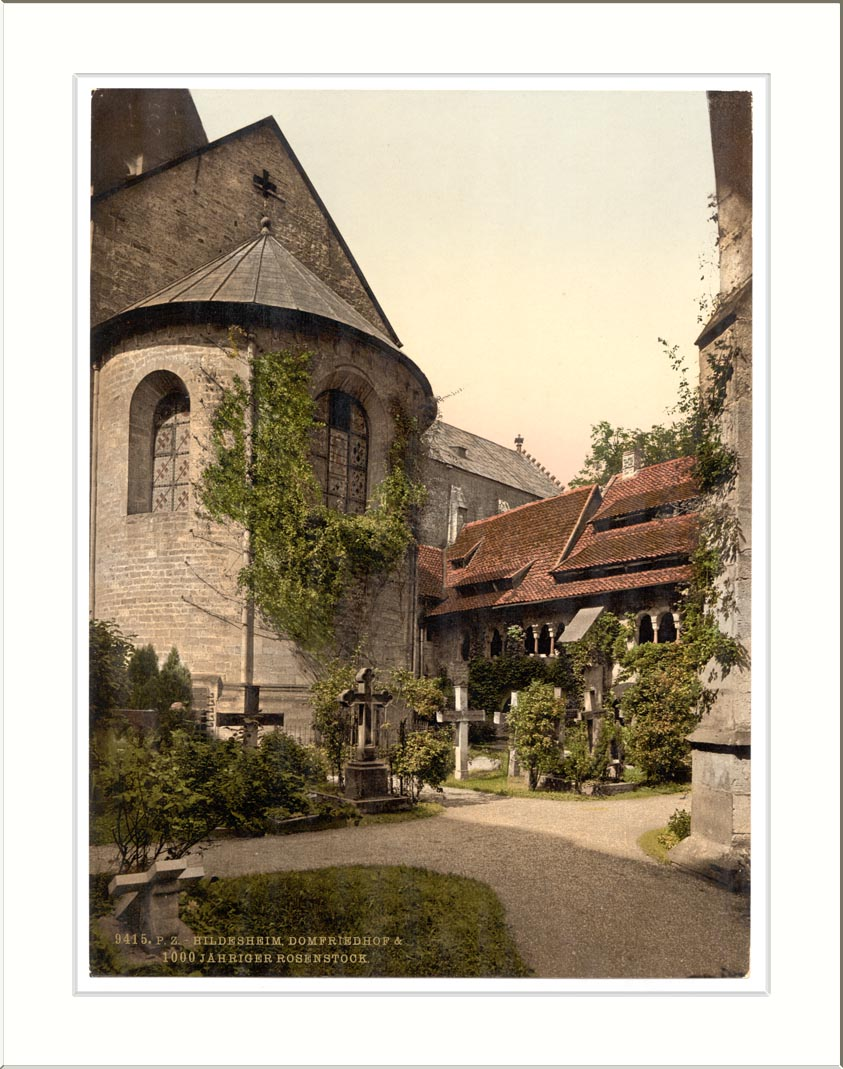
Old postcard with the rose, possibly around 1905–1909

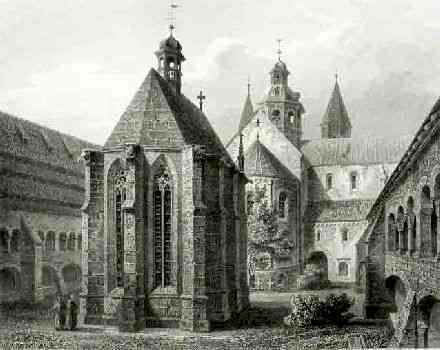
Cloister with St. Anne's Chapel and the rose in the background, c. 1845

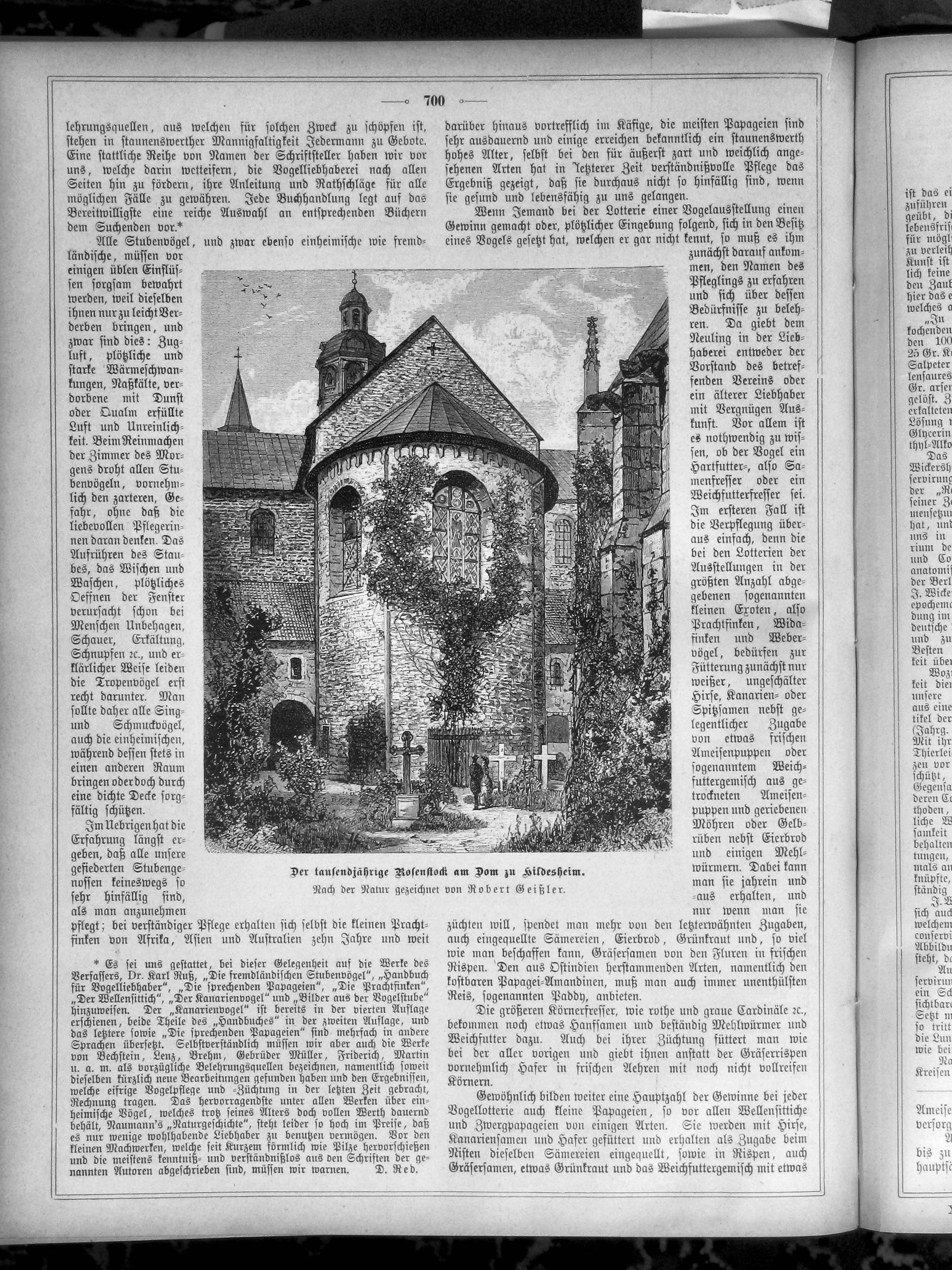
An illustration of the rose in an 1883 issue of the German journal Die Gartenlaube (The Garden Arbor)
