= Pennsylvania House (Springfield, Ohio) =

- U.S. National Register of Historic Places
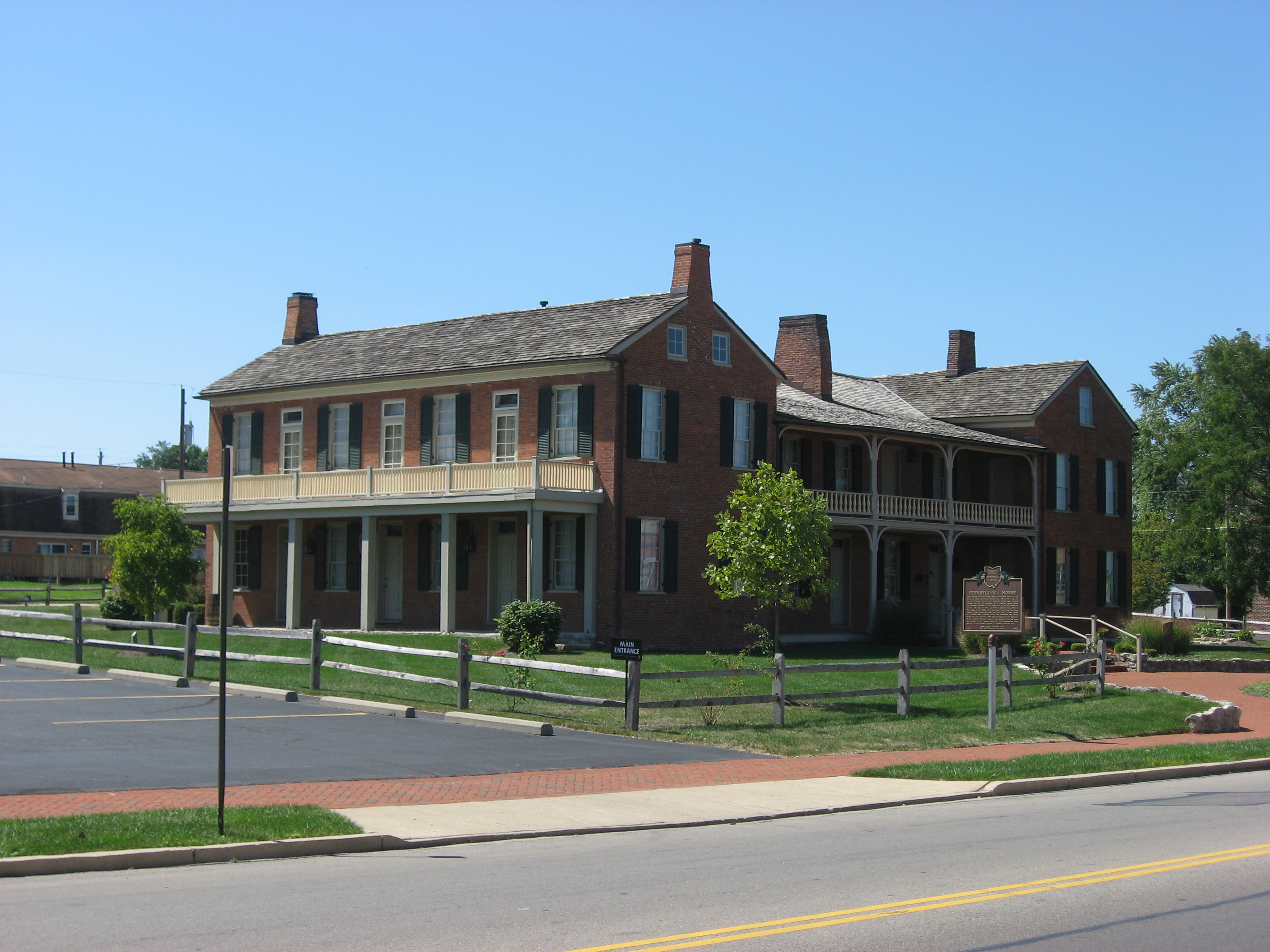
- Front of the Pennsylvania House

- Location within Ohio Location within the United States
- Location: 1311 W. Main St., Springfield, Ohio
- Coordinates: 39°55′32″N 83°49′58″W
- Area: less than one acre
- Built: 1839
- Architectural style: Federal
- NRHP reference No.: 73001396
- Added to NRHP: April 11, 1973

The Pennsylvania House is a historic inn and tavern in western Springfield, Ohio, United States. Built circa 1839, this three-story brick Federal structure lies along the original National Road and near the old road that connects Springfield with Dayton, Ohio.

In the early years of the nineteenth century, the National and Dayton-Springfield Roads were major transportation arteries for those bound for the West and for Cincinnati respectively. Inns such as the Pennsylvania House were instrumental in facilitating travel for the many would-be settlers and merchants headed for the western frontier and for all sorts of travellers proceeding southwest. Before the coming of the railroads, the Pennsylvania House provided beds and food for commoners and famous individuals alike. According to local lore, among the inn's guests were such individuals as Henry Clay, Charles Dickens, Andrew Jackson, and James K. Polk. The inn's owners typically lived on the premises; among the various owners were the family of Isaac Kaufmann Funk, founder of Funk and Wagnalls.

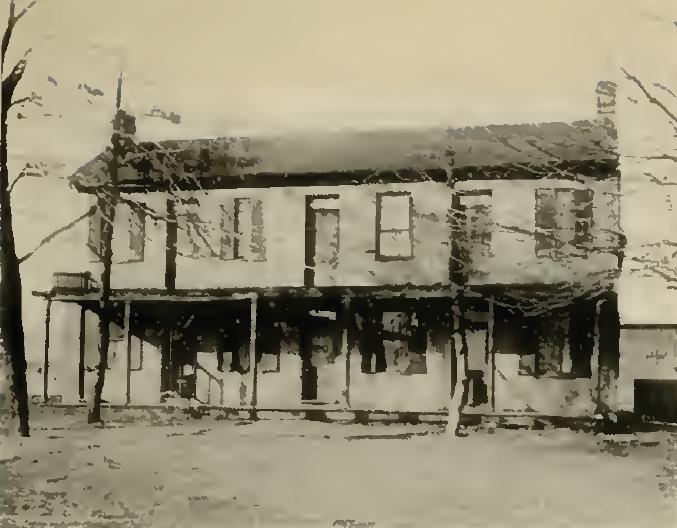
Appearance in or shortly before 1908

After more than twenty years of prosperity, the inn's traffic shrank after railroads reached Springfield in 1846. By the end of the Civil War, travellers on the National Road were so rare that the Pennsylvania House saw very little traffic indeed, and it closed in 1869. Despite its closure, the building has remained in fine condition for well over one hundred years; architectural elements such as the double-hung windows and the ornate six-panel doors have survived with little damage. In recognition of the inn's place in American history and of its well-preserved historic architecture, the Pennsylvania House was listed on the National Register of Historic Places in 1973.

Today, the Pennsylvania House is operated as a history museum with a concentration on the National Road.
