= Wilfred J. Funk =

American author, poet, lexicographer and publisher (1883–1965)

- Born: Wilfred John Funk; March 20, 1883
- Died: June 1, 1965 (aged 82); Montclair, New Jersey, US
- Occupation: Writer

Wilfred John Funk (March 20, 1883 – June 1, 1965) was an American writer, poet, lexicographer and publisher. He was president of Funk & Wagnalls from 1925 to 1940, and founded the publishing company Wilfred Funk, Inc.

== Personal life ==
Funk was the only son of Funk & Wagnalls' founder Isaac Kaufmann Funk. He graduated from Princeton in 1909, and joined the family firm. He married Eleanor Hawkins on July 29, 1915.

He had a wealthy lifestyle. His main residence was in Montclair, New Jersey, a suburb of Manhattan. His beach house "Cobble Court" in Southampton was a society venue in the Hamptons summer season. Several tax-efficient trusts Funk created for his wife were the subject of dispute with the Tax Office, ending in a Court of Appeals decision in 1950.

His son Wilfred J. Funk Jr was killed in August 1943 in Operation Cottage, the assault on Kiska, Alaska in an engagement with Japanese forces in World War II.

Wilfred Funk died of arteriosclerosis in Montclair.

== Early work ==
Funk became president of Funk & Wagnalls in 1925. In 1933, Time magazine described him as "titular president, but famed only for light verse". He had poems printed in the New York Evening Sun in 1928–29, and one called "Oh, Doctor!" in The New Yorker in 1930, whose opening lines were:

Mastoids, sinuses, and such
Bother children overmuch

In 1932, he publicized his firm's dictionary with a list of the ten most beautiful words in the English language, having regard for both sound and meaning.

dawn, hush, lullaby, murmuring, tranquil, mist, luminous, chimes, golden, melody

In 1934, he listed the "ten modern Americans who have done most to keep American jargon alive":

Sime Silverman, H. L. Mencken, Tad Dorgan, Walter Winchell, Arthur "Bugs" Baer, Ring Lardner, Damon Runyon, Gelett Burgess, George Ade, and Gene Buck

In 1937, he listed the ten most overworked words:

okay, terrific, lousy, definitely, racket, gal, honey, swell, contact, impact

He received an honorary Doctor of Letters degree in 1932 from Oglethorpe University.

== The Literary Digest ==
In March 1936 Funk became editor in chief of Funk & Wagnalls' magazine The Literary Digest. The Digest polled its readers regarding the outcome of the 1936 presidential election, and put Alf Landon at 56%; in fact he got only 36% of the vote. AIPO predicted not only the correct result, but also the result of the Digest poll. Funk had desired a wider poll with greater cross-checking, but the costs were prohibitive. He had not questioned the poll's fundamentally flawed methodology, and derided George Gallup of AIPO as "our fine statistical friend". Though Funk and the Digest were good-humored and self-deprecating about the embarrassment, it hastened the Digest's decline. Funk and Cuddihy sold the Digest to Albert Shaw in June 1937 for $200,000. Funk in turn got "a very good chuckle" when Gallup failed to predict the 1948 presidential election result.

== Publishing success ==
In late 1937, Funk started Your Life, a 128-page digest size Popular Guide to Desirable Living. At 25¢ an issue, it contained articles such as "Be Glad Your Wife's Neurotic" and "Why Commit Suicide?". Circulation ran to more than 100,000, with spin-off titles Your Personality and Your Health. The success of the magazine allowed him to start his own book publishing business in 1940, Wilfred Funk, Inc. Funk & Wagnalls acquired Wilfred Funk, Inc. in 1953.

Funk wrote numerous books on vocabulary and etymology aimed at a general audience. He favored descriptive linguistics over linguistic prescription, stating "Let's throw the old textbooks out the window, along with the words correct and incorrect, because there's really no such thing as grammar, but only an ever-changing language pattern formed by everyday usage". In 1942, he co-wrote 30 Days to a more Powerful Vocabulary with Norman Lewis; total sales to 1968 were claimed at 4.7m. In 1945, he created the Reader's Digest feature "It Pays to Increase Your Word Power". His son Peter continued this from 1962 to 1998.

== Works ==
Published works:

- Manhattans, Bronxes, and Queens (1931)
- Light Lines and Dears (1932)
- So You Think It's New (1937)
- It Might Be Verse (1938)
- When the Merry-go-round Breaks Down! (1938)
- The Inn (1940)
- If You Drink (1940)
- Love, Life, and Laughter (1942)
- 30 Days to a More Powerful Vocabulary (1942)
- Roosevelt's Foreign Policy (1931–1941): Franklin D. Roosevelt's Unedited Speeches and Messages (1942)
- The Way to Vocabulary Power and Culture (1946)
- Word Origins and Their Romantic Stories (1950)
- Your Life : Today's Guide to Desirable Living Wilfred Funk et al. (1951)
- 25 Magic Steps to Word Power (1958)
- Six Weeks to Words of Power (1959)
- Selected Verse of Wilfred Funk (1962)
