= Adam Willis Wagnalls =

American publisher (1844–1924)

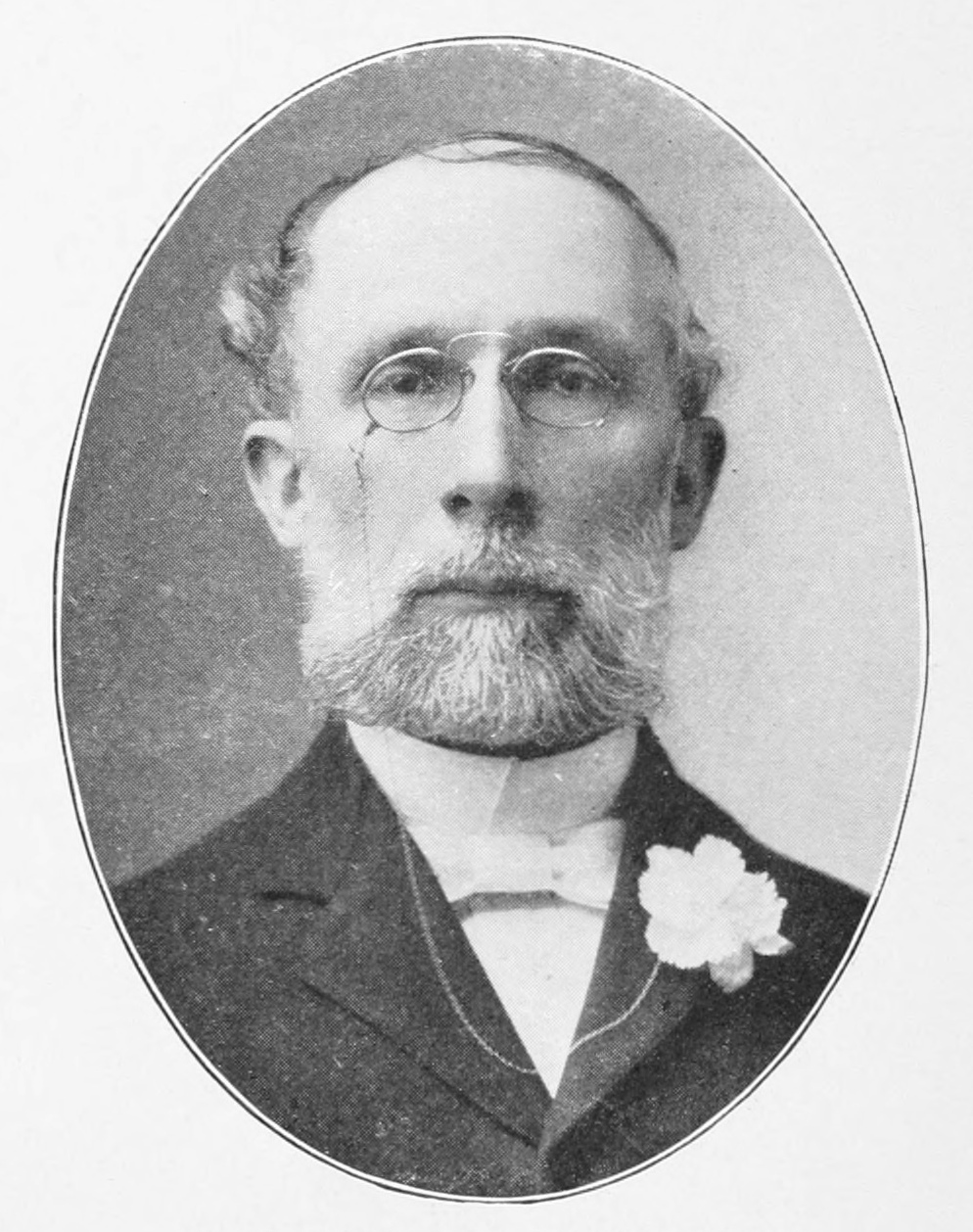
Adam Willis Wagnalls

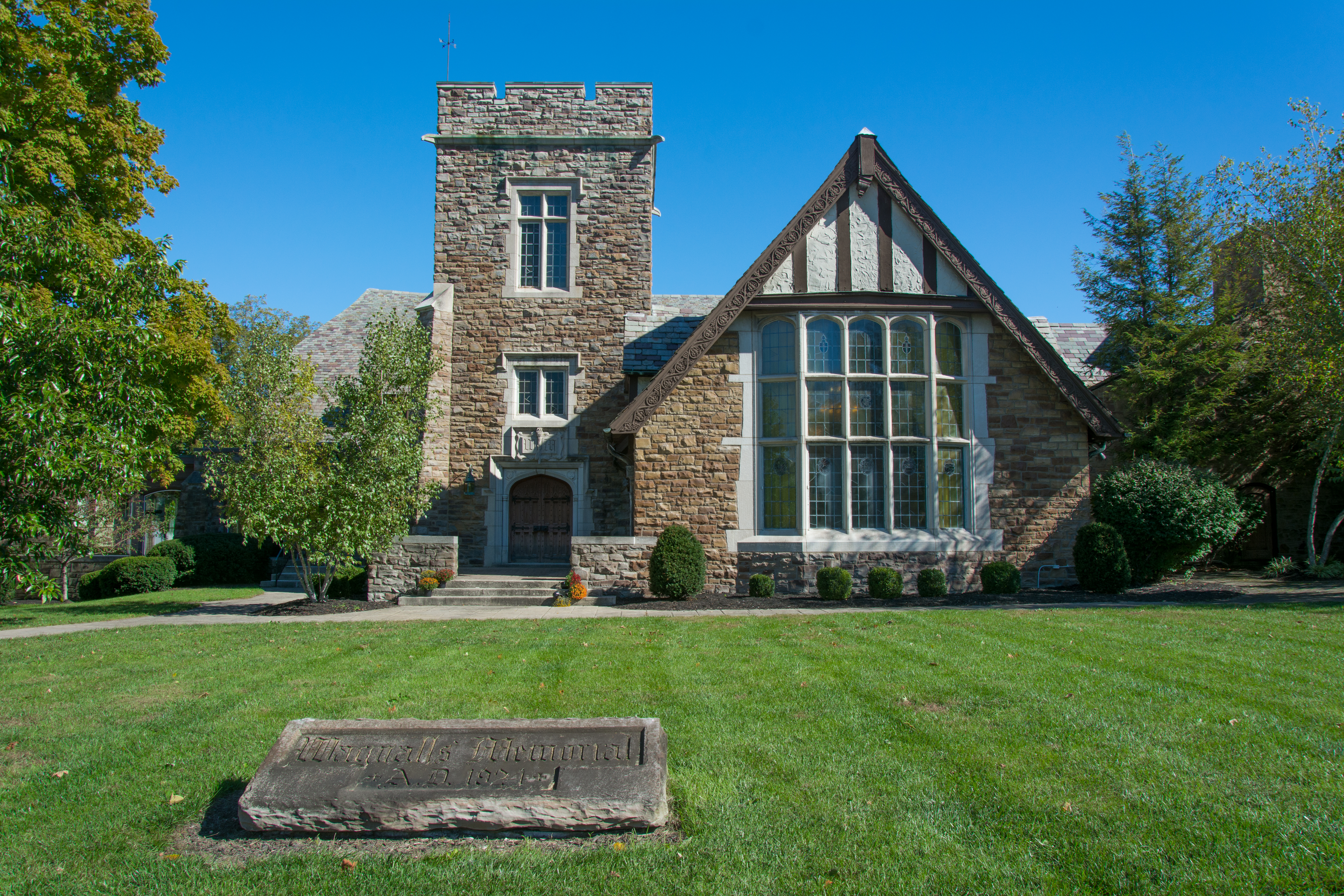
Wagnalls Memorial Library in Lithopolis, Ohio

Adam Willis Wagnalls (September 24, 1843 – September 3, 1924) was an American publisher. He was the co-founder of the Funk & Wagnalls Company in 1877.

Wagnalls was born in Lithopolis, Ohio, but moved away at age 5. Wagnalls attended Wittenberg College (now Wittenberg University) in Springfield, Ohio, where he became a Lutheran minister, with Isaac Kaufmann Funk. He married Hester Anna Willis, also a native of Lithopolis. They had one child, Mabel Wagnalls Jones.

Wagnalls died on September 3, 1924, in Northport, New York and is buried with his wife and their daughter at Lithopolis Cemetery.

== Sources ==
- Caskets on Parade
