= Norman Lewis (grammarian) =

American author (1912–2006)

- Born: Norman Lewis; December 30, 1912; Brooklyn, New York
- Died: September 8, 2006 (aged 93); Whittier, California
- Occupation: Author
- Writing career
- Notable works: 30 Days to a More Powerful Vocabulary, Word Power Made Easy

Norman Lewis (born December 30, 1912, in Brooklyn, New York – died September 8, 2006, in Whittier, California) was an author, grammarian, lexicographer, and etymologist. Lewis was a leading authority on English-language skills, whose best-selling 30 Days to a More Powerful Vocabulary published by Pocket Books in 1971 promised to teach readers "how to make words your slaves" in fifteen minutes a day.

== Early life ==
Born in Brooklyn, New York, in 1912, Lewis was orphaned at 5 and raised by an older sister and her husband. At eleven, he published his first article, a book report that appeared in the now-defunct New York World Telegram.

== Early career ==
Lewis sold his first non-fiction work—a quiz on the varieties of manias—to Leisure magazine for $1 in 1939. A fifteen-year magazine writing career followed.

A self-confessed "terrible student," Lewis spent nine years dropping in and out of City College of New York before earning a master's from Columbia University. While a student at Columbia he wrote his first book: a sixth-grade textbook entitled Journeys Through Wordland in 1941.

== Publishing success ==
In the early 1940s, Lewis wrote a monthly column for Your Life magazine that led to a contract with Funk & Wagnalls Co. -- and the promise that Funk would lend marquee value by collaborating on a book.

Eventually Funk "did two or three chapters," Lewis said. "I did the rest. I realized I was being had, but I thought it was a way to get started." With Funk's name on the cover of 30 Days and an advertising budget behind it, the book took off. It is considered one of the most widely used and popular how-to books of its kind. First published in 1942, the latest edition was published in 2003. The book was one of sixty-three that Lewis had written or edited.

Other better-known titles included Word Power Made Easy, a vocabulary builder published in 1949, and Roget's New Pocket Thesaurus in Dictionary Form, published in 1961.

Lewis told The Times in 1978 that the revised Roget's sold "like mad." At the time, more than five million copies of the pocket thesaurus had been purchased.

Despite his publishing success, Lewis often said that "writing is my job, but teaching is my recreation."

Much of Lewis's work is still in print, including Word Power Made Easy (Pocket Books, 1979); 30 Days to Better English (Signet, 1985); and 30 Days to a More Powerful Vocabulary (Pocket Books, 1971), written with Wilfred Funk. Lewis also edited several editions of Roget’s Thesaurus, including The New Roget’s Thesaurus in Dictionary Form (Berkley, 1976).

== Teaching ==
Lewis started his teaching career at New York University and the City College of New York. From 1964 to 1995, he taught English—including grammar, etymology and vocabulary—at Rio Hondo College, a two-year community college in Whittier, California. For more than a decade, he was also the chairman of Rio Hondo's communications department.

== Death ==
Lewis was married to Mary (née Goldstein). He died of natural causes in 2006, in Whittier, California at age 93.

== Works ==
- How to Get More Out of Your Reading
- How to Read Better and Faster
- Word Power Made Easy
- 30 Days to a More Powerful Vocabulary (with Wilfred Funk)
- Dictionary of Word Power
- Dictionary of Correct Spelling
- Speak Better, Write Better
- Correct Spelling Made Easy
- Better English
- Instant Word Power
- Instant Spelling Power
- Dictionary of Pronunciation
- Rapid Vocabulary Builder
- R.S.V.P – Reading Spelling Vocabulary Pronunciation
