= Revelation (1924 film) =

1924 film

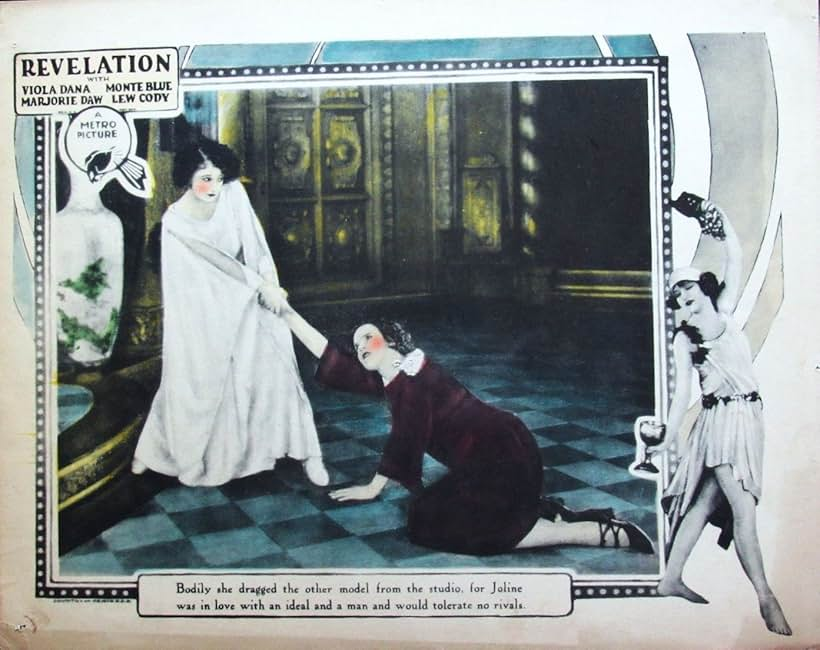
- Directed by: George D. Baker
- Written by: George D. Baker, based on a Mabel Wagnalls story
- Starring: Viola Dana; Monte Blue; Lew Cody
- Cinematography: John Arnold
- Edited by: Grant Whytock
- Distributed by: Metro-Goldwyn
- Release date: June 23, 1924
- Running time: 9 reels
- Country: United States
- Languages: Silent; English intertitles

Revelation is a 1924 American silent drama film starring Viola Dana, Monte Blue, and Lew Cody. The film was directed and written by George D. Baker and based upon a popular novel, The Rosebud of a Thousand Years. Dana was one of the top stars of the newly amalgamated MGM, a lively comedian who enjoyed a long career that faded with the emergence of the talkies. Metro Pictures (now called MGM) had filmed Revelation in 1918, starring Alla Nazimova and also directed by Baker.

== Plot ==
Joline Hofer (Viola Dana) is a profligate Montmartre dancer who left her illegitimate child in a convent. Paul Granville (Monte Blue) is an American artist who becomes smitten by the dancer, and uses her for his portraits of great women. When one of Paul's paintings, of the Madonna, appears to result in a miracle, Joline's life is changed forever, as she reforms, reclaims her child, and marries the artist.

== Cast ==
- Viola Dana - Joline Hofer
- Monte Blue - Paul Granville
- Marjorie Daw - Mademoiselle Brevoort
- Lew Cody - Count Adrian de Roche
- Frank Currier - Prior
- Edward Connelly - Augustin
- Kathleen Key - Madonna
- Ethel Wales - Madame Hofer
- George Siegmann - Hofer
- Otto Matieson - Du Clos
- Bruce Guerin - Jean Hofer

== Preservation status ==
This film has been preserved by MGM.
