= Continuity marketing =

Business relationship that continues until the customer ends it by notifying the marketer

Continuity marketing is a method of providing goods or services to consumers that relies on direct marketing and continues into perpetuity. Also known as auto-replenishment, this relationship continues until the customer ends it by notifying the marketer.

== Overview ==
The general concept is that a customer places an original order, typically through a mail order offer or online. This original offering is usually heavily discounted and acts as a loss leader. Within a prescribed period of time, a subsequent shipment will be delivered to the customer. Thereafter, additional shipments will continue to be sent at regular intervals. If the customer has not indicated which specific product they wish to receive, then the marketer will choose for the customer on the basis of that customer's previous choices. This continues until the customer notifies the supplier of their choices or their desire to discontinue the service.

Continuity marketing is a primary distribution method for magazines and book clubs, such as Doubleday and Harlequin, and music clubs such as Columbia House. International Masters Publishers has distributed millions of recipe cards internationally in this fashion.
