= Isaac K. Funk =

American Lutheran minister, editor, lexicographer, publisher and spelling reformer

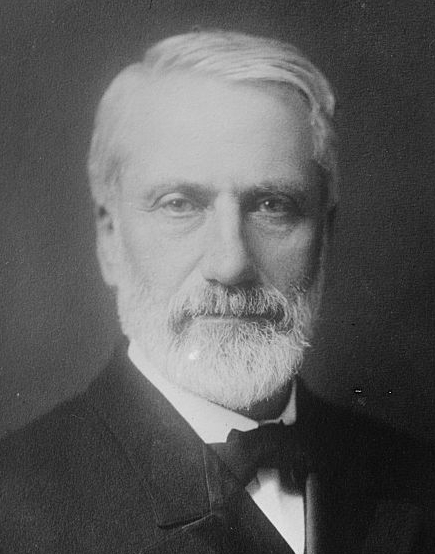
- Born: Isaac Kaufmann Funk; September 10, 1839; Clifton, Ohio, U.S.
- Died: April 4, 1912 (aged 72); Montclair, New Jersey, U.S.
- Education: Wittenberg College; Wittenberg Theological Seminary
- Occupations: Minister, editor, lexicographer, publisher, and spelling reformer
- Known for: Co-founder of Funk & Wagnalls Co.
- Spouses: Eliza Thompson (m. 1864; died 1868) Helen Gertrude Thompson (m. 1869; died 1911)
- Children: Wilfred J. Funk; Lida Funk Scott

Isaac Kaufmann Funk (September 10, 1839 – April 4, 1912) was an American Lutheran minister, editor, lexicographer, publisher, and spelling reformer. He was the co-founder of Funk & Wagnalls Company, the father of author Wilfred J. Funk (who founded his own publishing company, Wilfred Funk, Inc., and wrote the Word Power feature in Reader's Digest from 1945 to 1962), and the grandfather of author Peter Funk, who continued his father's authorship of Word Power until 2003. Funk & Wagnalls Company published The Literary Digest, The Standard Dictionary of the English Language, and Funk & Wagnalls Standard Encyclopedia.

== Early life ==
Funk was born in 1839 in the village of Clifton, Ohio. In 1842, he moved to Springfield, Ohio, where his father John managed the Pennsylvania House.

Years later, he attended Wittenberg College (now Wittenberg University) and Wittenberg Theological Seminary, both in Springfield.

== Career ==
Upon his graduation in 1860, he was ordained as a Lutheran pastor, and served pastorates in New York, Indiana, and his home state of Ohio; his last pastorate was at Saint Matthews English Lutheran Church in Brooklyn, New York, where he stayed seven years. In 1872, Funk resigned from the ministry and made an extensive tour through Europe, northern Africa, and Asia Minor.

Funk was a prohibitionist. He founded the Voice in 1880, an organ of the Prohibition Party, and he was the Prohibition candidate for mayor of New York. His Staten Island home, "grand in scale and extremely decorative", was built in 1893 in what was then Prohibition Park, and the home still stands.

In 1875 he founded the publishing firm of I.K. Funk & Company, with the help of a Wittenberg classmate, Adam Willis Wagnalls, a lawyer and accountant. That year he founded and published the Metropolitan Pulpit (later its name was changed to Homiletic Review). Missionary Review also numbered among the many religious publications he founded after 1876. In 1877 the name of his company was changed to Funk & Wagnalls Company, to reflect Wagnalls' partnership. In 1890 Funk published The Literary Digest, a departure from the religious works earlier in his career.

Perhaps Funk's most important achievement was his Standard Dictionary of the English Language, the first volume of which was published in 1893. He worked with a team of more than 740 people. His aim was to provide essential information thoroughly and simply at the same time. In order to achieve this he placed current meanings first, archaic meanings second, and etymologies last. The dictionary was said to have cost Funk & Wagnalls over $960,000.

From 1901 until 1906, Funk & Wagnalls compiled the Jewish Encyclopædia. After Funk died in 1912, the publishing house eventually became a subsidiary of Thomas Y. Crowell Co.

=== Psychic research ===
In his later years, Funk spent time on psychic research. Funk was a believer in spiritualism and in his book, The Widow's Mite and Other Psychic Phenomena, published in 1904, he defended a number of mediums and spirit photography.

Magician Joseph Rinn has noted that Funk was easily duped by fraudulent mediums, such as the Bangs Sisters. Funk had bought several of their 'spirit' pictures, unaware they were produced fraudulently. He also defended Anna Eva Fay and May S. Pepper, two mediums that were also exposed.

== Personal life ==
Funk married Eliza Thompson of Carey, Ohio in 1864. After her death in 1868, Funk married her sister, Helen Gertrude Thompson (1842–1911). Funk had two sons and a daughter:

- James A. Funk (1876–1898), who predeceased his father in 1898 at age 21.
- Wilfred John Funk (1883–1965)
- Lida M. Funk, a Vassar College graduate who married Robert Scott in 1895.

Funk died in Montclair, New Jersey on April 4, 1912. After some bequests to his alma mater and his brother, the residue of the estate was left to his two surviving children.

== Selected works ==
- The Complete Preacher, Sermons Preached By Some of the Most Prominent Clergymen (The Religious Newspaper Agency, New York. 1878)
- Great Advance: Address by Dr. I.K. Funk, as Chairman of the New York Prohibition State Convention. Saratoga, September 12, 1895 (The Voice. 1895)
- Next Step in Evolution the Present Step (1902)
- The Widow's Mite and Other Psychic Phenomena (Funk & Wagnalls Co. 1904)
- The Psychic Riddle (Funk & Wagnalls Co. 1907)
- Standard Encyclopedia of the World's Knowledge (Funk and Wagnalls Co. 1912)
