= Funk & Wagnalls =

American publisher

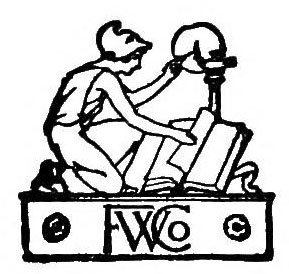
- Logo of Funk and Wagnalls from a 1922 edition of Hoyt's Cyclopedia of Quotations
- Status: Defunct 2009
- Founded: 1875
- Founder: Isaac Kaufmann Funk
- Successor: World Book
- Country of origin: United States
- Key people: George Alfred Hartley (key financial contributor)
- Publication types: Reference works

Funk & Wagnalls was an American publisher known for its reference works, including A Standard Dictionary of the English Language (1st ed. 1893–5), and the Funk & Wagnalls Standard Encyclopedia (25 volumes, 1st ed. 1912).

The encyclopedia was renamed Funk & Wagnalls New Standard Encyclopedia in 1931 and in 1945, it was known as New Funk & Wagnalls Encyclopedia, Universal Standard Encyclopedia, Funk & Wagnalls Standard Reference Encyclopedia, and Funk & Wagnalls New Encyclopedia (29 volumes, 1st ed. 1971).

The last printing of Funk & Wagnalls New Encyclopedia was in 1997. As of 2025, annual Yearbooks are still in production.

The I.K. Funk & Company, founded in 1875, was renamed Funk & Wagnalls Company after two years, and later became Funk & Wagnalls Inc., then Funk & Wagnalls Corporation.

== History ==
Isaac Kaufmann Funk founded the business in 1875 as I.K. Funk & Company. In 1877, Adam Willis Wagnalls, one of Funk's classmates at Wittenberg College (now Wittenberg University), joined the firm as a partner and the name of the firm was changed to Funk & Wagnalls Company.

During its early years, Funk & Wagnalls Company published religious books. The publication of The Literary Digest in 1890 marked a shift to publishing of general reference dictionaries and encyclopedias. The firm published The Standard Dictionary of the English Language ^{(OCLC 19715240)} in 2 volumes in 1893 and 1895, and Funk & Wagnalls Standard Encyclopedia ^{(OCLC 1802064)} in 1912.

In 1913, the New Standard Unabridged Dictionary of the English Language was published under the supervision of Isaac K. Funk (Editor-in-Chief). The New Standard Unabridged Dictionary was revised until 1943, a later edition that was also supervised by Charles Earl Funk.

The encyclopedia was based upon Chambers's Encyclopaedia: "Especially are we indebted to the famous Chambers's Encyclopaedia ... With its publishers we have arranged to draw upon its stores as freely as we have found it of advantage so to do."

In 1914, Robert Cuddihy acquired ownership of Funk & Wagnalls. Wilfred J. Funk, the son of Isaac Funk, was president of the company from 1925 to 1940. At that point, he left to form his own company, Wilfred Funk, Inc. Funk & Wagnalls acquired Wilfred Funk, Inc. in 1953.

In 1934, Funk & Wagnalls started the Literary Digest Books imprint. It launched with seven titles with up to twenty-five a year intended. The imprint lasted into mid-1935. The company sold The Literary Digest to the Review of Reviews in 1937.

Unicorn Press (later known as the Standard Reference Work Publishing Co.) obtained the rights to publish the encyclopedia. By 1953 that firm began to sell the encyclopedia through a supermarket continuity marketing campaign, encouraging consumers to include the latest volume of the encyclopedia on their shopping lists. Grocery stores in the 1970s in the Midwest (Chicago – Jewel Grocers) typically kept about four volumes in a rotation, dropping the last and adding the latest until all volumes could be acquired with the initial first volume being 99 cents. The first several volumes were gold painted along the edges and the later volumes were not. A volume was typically priced at $2.99, but toward the later volumes the price had increased with the inflation of the 1970s. If one did not go shopping on a weekly basis, or delivery was spotty, there was a good chance that a volume might be missed to complete the set. The encyclopedia was also sold as a mail order set of 36(?) volumes; one volume a month.

Also sold in grocery stores, one volume at a time, was the Family Library Of Great Music, a 22-album series of classical recordings. One famous composer was highlighted in each release. The records were manufactured exclusively for Funk & Wagnalls by RCA Custom.

In 1963, Corinthian Broadcasting acquired Standard Reference Works. In 1965, Funk & Wagnalls was sold to Reader's Digest. At the time Robert Cuddihy's son Paul was company chairman.

In 1971, Funk and Wagnalls, was sold to Corinthian Broadcasting, now a subsidiary of Dun & Bradstreet, which also owned the Thomas Y. Crowell Co.. Dun and Bradstreet retained Funk & Wagnalls New Encyclopedia, but sold Crowell to Harper & Row in 1977.

In 1984, Dun & Bradstreet sold Funk & Wagnalls, Inc., to a group of Funk & Wagnalls executives, who in turn sold it to Field Corporation in 1988.

In 1991, the company was sold to K-III Holdings (now Rent Group), and then in 1993 Funk & Wagnalls Corporation acquired the World Almanac.

After failing to purchase rights to the text of the Encyclopædia Britannica and World Book Encyclopedia for its Encarta digital encyclopedia, Microsoft reluctantly used (under license) the text of Funk & Wagnalls encyclopedia for the first editions of its encyclopedia. This licensed text was gradually replaced over the following years with content Microsoft created itself.

In 1998, as part of the Information division of Primedia (now Rent Group), the encyclopedia content appeared on the Web site "funkandwagnalls.com". This short-lived venture was shut down in 2001.

Ripplewood Holdings bought Primedia's education division in 1999, which became part of Reader's Digest Association in 2007. In 2009, Funk & Wagnalls was acquired by World Book Encyclopedia.

== Publications ==
- 18?? – The Preacher's Homiletic Commentary on the Old Testament
- 18?? – The Preacher's Homiletic Commentary on the New Testament
- 1882-84 - Schaff–Herzog Encyclopedia of Religious Knowledge
- 1890 – The Literary Digest
- 1891 – The Encyclopedia of Missions
- 1893–95 – The Standard Dictionary of the English Language
- 1901/1906 – The Jewish Encyclopedia, 12 volumes
- 1904 - The Works of Edgar Allan Poe, 10 volumes
- 1905 — Mrs. Maybrick's Own Story: My Fifteen Lost Years by Florence Maybrick
- 1906 – The World's Famous Orations, 10 volume set
- 1909 – Standard Bible Dictionary
- 1912 – Funk & Wagnalls Standard Encyclopedia
- 1913–1943 The New Standard Unabridged Dictionary of the English Language, Two volumes
- 1915 – Women of all nations: a record of their characteristics, habits, manners, customs, and influence, Volume 1
- 1915 – Women of all nations: a record of their characteristics, habits, manners, customs, and influence, Volume 2
- 1915 – Women of all nations: a record of their characteristics, habits, manners, customs, and influence, Volume 3
- 1920 – Funk and Wagnall's Student's Standard Dictionary of the English language [Hardcover]
- 1922 - Etiquette in Society, in Business, in Politics, and at Home by Emily Post
- 1927 – The World's One Hundred Best Short Stories, 10 volumes
- 1929 – The World's Best 100 Detective Stories, in 10 volumes
- 1929 – Pocket Library of the World's Essential Knowledge, 10 volumes
- 1929 – The World's 1000 Best Poems, 10 volumes
- 1936 – A New Standard Bible Dictionary
- 1937 - New Standard Encyclopedia Year Book for 1936
- 1946 – Funk and Wagnalls New Practical Standard Dictionary, 2 volumes Re-Copyrighted in 1949, 1951, 1952, 1953, 1954 1955 ***First hand account from volumes dated 1955.
- 1949/50 – Funk & Wagnalls Standard Dictionary of Folklore, Mythology and Legend, 2 volumes. A one-volume edition with minor revisions was released in 1972.
- 1957 – The Fashion Dictionary
- 19?? – Funk & Wagnalls Standard Handbook of Synonyms, Antonyms, and Prepositions
- 1968 – Handbook of Indoor Games & Stunts [Paperbook F58]
- 1971 – Standard Dictionary of the English Language (International Edition)
- 19?? – Poetry handbook; a dictionary of terms
- 1971 – Funk & Wagnalls New Encyclopedia
- 1973 – Funk & Wagnalls Guide to modern world literature
- 1974 – Funk & Wagnalls Wildlife Encyclopedia
- 1974 – Funk & Wagnalls Standard Desk Dictionary (2nd Edition)
- 1980 – The New Funk & Wagnalls Illustrated Wildlife Encyclopedia
- 1986 – Funk & Wagnalls New Encyclopedia of Science
- 1996 – Funk & Wagnalls World Atlas

== In popular culture ==
During certain scenes of banter between Dan Rowan and Dick Martin on the NBC comedy-variety show Rowan & Martin's Laugh-In, after a particular anecdote of trivia or wisdom, Dick Martin would close with: "Look that up in your Funk & Wagnalls!" Sales of the Funk & Wagnalls dictionary reportedly increased by 30% as a result of this recurring joke.

On The Tonight Show Starring Johnny Carson, sidekick Ed McMahon would begin each "Carnac the Magnificent" sketch by explaining that the envelopes he would hand to Johnny Carson (in character as "Carnac") had been: "...hermetically sealed in a mayonnaise jar on Funk and Wagnall's back porch since noon today!" The envelopes contained questions, to which "Carnac" would divine the answers by reading a script on his desk.

In an episode of South Park (Season 7, Episode 1) entitled "Cancelled", the character Eric Cartman is quoted as saying to his friends Stan, Kyle, and Kenny, "What the Funk & Wagnalls are you guys talking about?", as the other boys are discussing a past memory of aliens abducting Cartman, which was a reference to the show's pilot episode.

In season 1, episode 21 of West Wing, the character of C.J. tells the character of Toby, "Thank you, Funk and Wagnall's." Which Toby turns to another character Ginger as they are walking away from C.J., "What'd she call me?". Ginger replies, "Funk and Wagnall's. They make the dictionary." Toby replies, "I know who Funk and Wagnall's are."
