= January 1912 =

Month of 1912

<<	January 1912					>>
Su	Mo	Tu	We	Th	Fr	Sa
	1	2	3	4	5	6
7	8	9	10	11	12	13
14	15	16	17	18	19	20
21	22	23	24	25	26	27
28	29	30	31

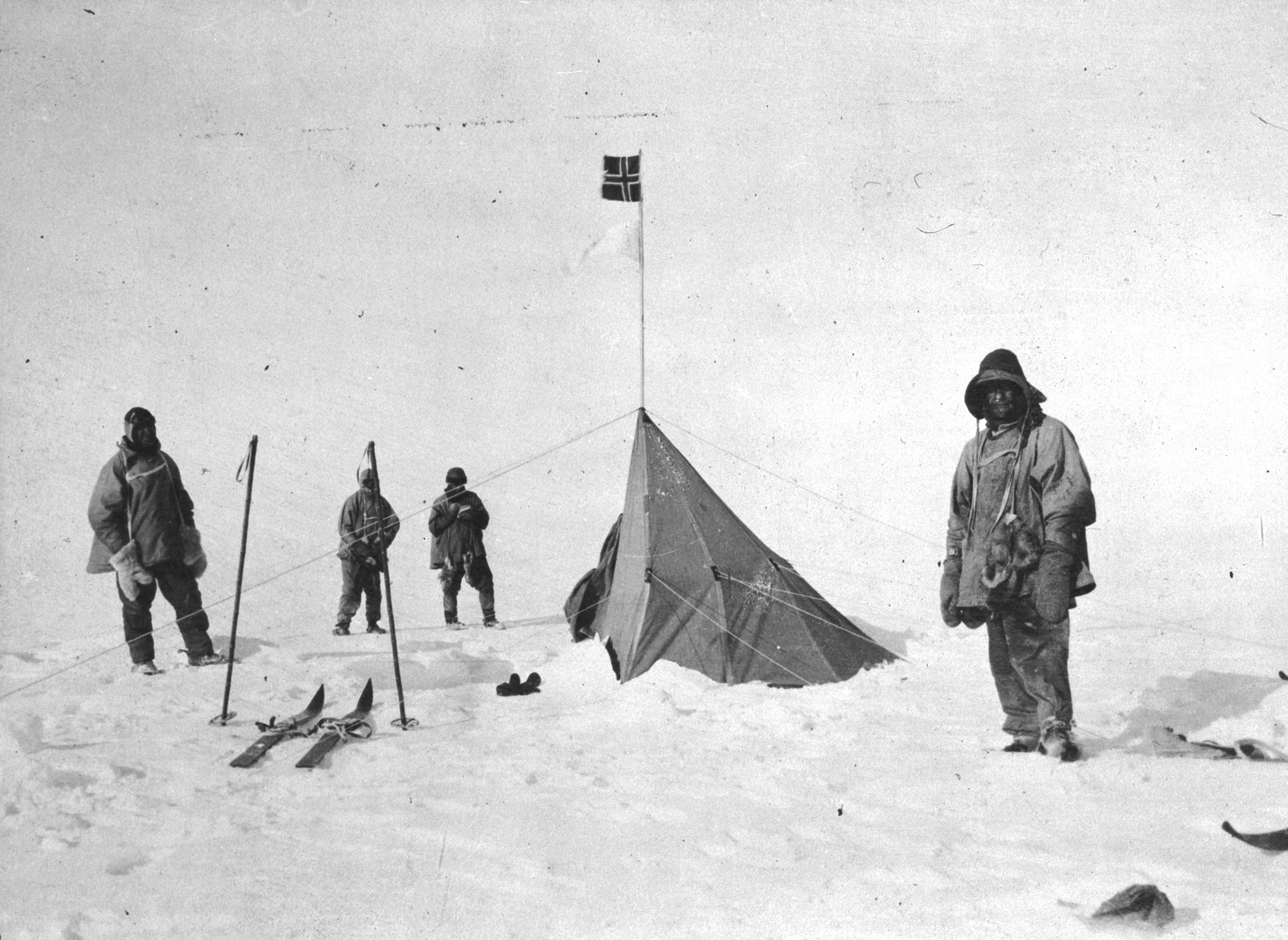
January 17, 1912: Scott discovers that Amundsen reached the South Pole first

January 6, 1912: New Mexico becomes 47th U.S. state

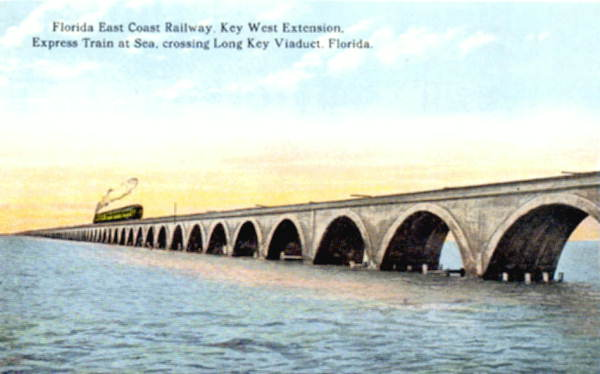
January 22, 1912: The Overseas Railroad opens in Florida

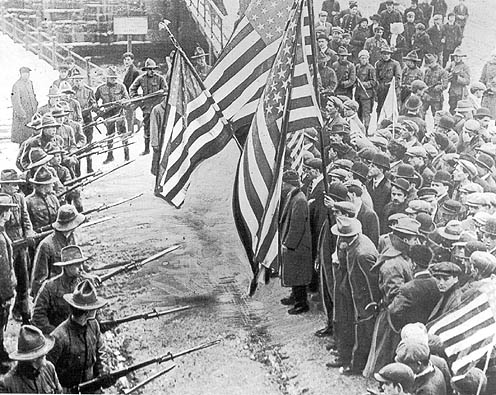
January 11, 1912: American Textile workers unite in walkout

The following events occurred in January 1912:

== January 1, 1912 (Monday) ==
- The Republic of China was established as Dr. Sun Yat-sen took the oath of office as the Provisional President at Nanjing. According to Homer Lea, an advisor to Sun and the only Westerner to witness the ceremony, a band played "Behold, the Conquering Hero Comes" and the hymn "God Be with You till We Meet Again." Although Sun's supporters controlled most of southern China, Yuan Shikai retained power in the north as the chief of the Emperor's army in Beijing, and would soon become president of a united nation.
- The Swiss Civil Code, adopted on December 10, 1907, came into operation under the Berne Convention. The code was the work of law professor Eugen Huber and the product of 15 years of refinement. As one commentator noted, "There was nothing hurried in the preparation or adoption of this code."
- The classification and renumbering of all the rolling stock of the three constituent railways that formed South African Railways in 1910 was implemented.
- England beat France, 7–1, in international soccer at Tufnell Park in London.
- Manchester United did not renew their lease for the Bank Street football stadium in Clayton, Manchester, allowing the football grounds to be sold later that month.
- Pinellas County, Florida, came into existence after being divided from Hillsborough County.
- The city of Timmins, Ontario, was incorporated as a company town located at the "Porcupine Camp" of a gold mining company.
- Born:
  - Kim Philby, British intelligence officer, member of the Cambridge Five spy ring who passed secret information to the Soviet Union; as Harold Adrian Russell Philby in Ambala, British India (d. 1988). Philby was born three days after Klaus Fuchs, who had betrayed American atomic secrets to the Soviets, and died four months after Fuchs.
  - Salah al-Din al-Bitar, Syrian state leader, Prime Minister of Syria in 1963, 1964 and 1966; in Damascus (d. 1980).
  - Khertek Anchimaa-Toka, Tuvan Soviet state leader, Chair of Little Khural of the Tuvan People's Republic from 1940 to 1944 (now part of Tuva, Russia) and the first non-hereditary female head of government; in Bay-Tayginsky District (d. 2008).
  - Martyn Finlay, New Zealand Attorney-General from 1972 to 1975; in Dunedin (d. 1999).
  - Nikiforos Vrettakos, Greek poet, known for poetry collections including Τά ποιήματα, at Krokees (d. 1991).

== January 2, 1912 (Tuesday) ==
- With 4,000 Russian troops occupying the Persian city of Tabriz, the Russian authorities executed eight of the Iranian leaders who had supported the Persian Constitutional Revolution and had failed to leave the city. The date chosen coincided with Shi'ite holiday of the 10th of Muharram.
- The Bradshaw Mountain Railroad merged with the California, Arizona and Santa Fe Railway.
- Neurologist Ernst Trömner introduced a test for what he called the Fingerbeugephänomen, though it is more commonly called "Trömner's reflex," at a meeting of the Hamburg Medical Society. The reflex is tested on a patient's fingers for signs of a lesion of the cervical nerves.
- Died: Alfred D'Orsay Tennyson Dickens, 66, son and biographer of Charles Dickens, died during a lecture tour in New York City. (b. 1845).

== January 3, 1912 (Wednesday) ==
- Incumbent John Alexander Mathieson was re-elected Premier of Prince Edward Island in a provincial election.
- British Antarctic Expedition – Robert Falcon Scott and seven fellow explorers made the planned separation, with the original goal of Scott, Edward Wilson, Lawrence Oates and Edgar Evans to make the final assault on the South Pole, and Edward Evans, Tom Crean, William Lashly and Henry Robertson Bowers to return to base. Captain Scott changed the plan, adding Bowers to the South Pole group, and sharing four persons' resources with five people, a decision that would prove to be disastrous.
- Born: Armand Lohikoski, American-born Finnish movie director, known for the comedic film series Pekka and Pätkä; in Astoria, Oregon (d. 2005).
- Died:
  - Felix Dahn, 77, German writer, author of A Struggle for Rome (b. 1834).
  - Robley D. Evans, 65, American naval officer, commander of United States Asiatic Fleet from 1902 to 1904, North Atlantic Fleet from 1905 to 1907, at the beginning of the "Great White Fleet" voyage around the world (b. 1846).

== January 4, 1912 (Thursday) ==
- The Royal Charter of the Boy Scouts Association was granted by King George, granting corporate status to the British organization that had been founded in 1908.
- The Moon was at its closest point to Earth in the 20th century, at 221,451 miles distance (356,375 km). On March 2, 1984, the Moon would be furthest away during the century, at 252,731 miles. The closest approach in the 21st century was on November 14, 2016, at 221,535 miles, and the most distant took place on March 14, 2002 (252,728 miles).
- Died: Francis T. Nicholls, 77, brigadier general for the Confederate States Army during the American Civil War, and post-Reconstruction Governor of Louisiana 1877 to 1880 and 1888 to 1892. Nicholls State University, founded 36 years after his death, was named in his honor (b. 1834).

== January 5, 1912 (Friday) ==
- Dr. Sun Yat-sen issued the "Manifesto from the Republic of China to All Friendly Nations," shifting a change in its foreign policy with a promise to end the isolationism of the Manchu Emperors, and "to rejoin China with the international community." On the same day, Dr. Sun met with women's suffragist Lin Zongsu and pledged to aid in allowing women the right to vote in the new republic.
- A colonial force of 200 men left the port of Dili for the inland to suppress a growing revolt in East Timor.
- The Tong Wars in New York City's Chinatown resumed, one year and two days after the January 3, 1911, truce between the Hip Sing and On Leong gangs. Lung Yu, the vice-president of the Hip Sing Tong, was killed in a shootout at a gambling hall on 21 Pell Street.
- The Moscow Art Theatre opened with a production of Hamlet, a production that drew international acclaim and brought the theater company "to the world's stage."

== January 6, 1912 (Saturday) ==
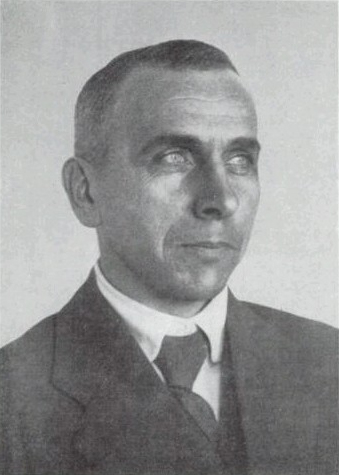
Alfred Wegener

- New Mexico was admitted as the 47th state of the United States at 1:35 pm, after U.S. President William Howard Taft signed the proclamation. New Mexico had been passed up for statehood on 15 other occasions since becoming a territory in 1850. William C. McDonald was its first governor, and Albert B. Fall and Thomas B. Catron were its first U.S. Senators.
- The first airplane crash in Australia occurred, when pilot W. E. Hart was forced to crash land between Mount Druitt and Rooty Hill in New South Wales. He and his companion were able to escape with minor injuries.
- At a meeting of the Geological Association of Germany at Frankfurt am Main, Alfred Wegener first presented the theory of continental drift, reading his paper, Die Herausbildung der Grossformen der Erdinde (Kontinente und Ozeane) auf geophysikalischer Grundlage ("The geophysical basis of the evolution of large-scale features of the earth's crust").
- Born:
  - Danny Thomas, American television personality, best known for 1950s television sitcom The Danny Thomas Show, founder of St. Jude Children's Research Hospital; as Amos Kairouz in Deerfield, Michigan (d. 1991).
  - Jacques Ellul, French philosopher, author of The Technological Society and Propaganda: The Formation of Men's Attitudes; in Bordeaux (d. 1994).
  - Frederick Manfred, American writer, author of many Western novels including The Golden Bowl and Buckskin Man Tales; as Frederick Feike Feikema VII near Doon, Iowa (d. 1994).

== January 7, 1912 (Sunday) ==
- William Morgan Shuster resigned as treasurer-general of Persia, bringing to an end the war with Russia. In return for his resignation, the Russians guaranteed safe passage through occupied territory for Shuster and his family. He left Tehran on January 11 by automobile, and departed the country on the Russian steamer Teheran on January 14, returning to the United States by way of Russia.
- Italo-Turkish War – Seven Turkish gunboats were sunk by three Italian warships (the cruiser Piemonte and the destroyers Garibaldi and Artigliere) in a battle in the Red Sea outside of Kunfida (now Al Qunfudhah in Saudi Arabia).
- Born:
  - Charles Addams, American cartoonist, best known for creating macabre recurring characters that were adapted to television in The Addams Family; in Westfield, New Jersey (d. 1988).
  - Giorgio Caproni, Italian poet, known for his works including L'opera in versi; in Livorno (d. 1990).
  - Ivan Yakubovsky, Soviet army officer, 30th Marshal of the Soviet Union, commander of the Allies of the Warsaw Pact from 1967 to 1976; in Zaitsava, Mogilev Governorate, Russian Empire (now Horki District, Belarus) (d. 1976).
- Died: Sophia Jex-Blake, 71, British physician and activist, member of the first group of female medical students at the University of Edinburgh (b. 1840).

== January 8, 1912 (Monday) ==
- The African National Congress (ANC) was founded as the South African Native National Congress in a four-day meeting at Bloemfontein, South Africa. African lawyer Pixley ka Isaka Seme wrote letters to the leaders of South Africa's various tribes and organized the meeting, giving the opening address to 60 delegates. Reverend John Langalibalele Dube, who published the Zulu language newspaper Ilange Lasa Natal, was elected as the organization's first president, with Sol Plaatje as secretary and Seme as treasurer. The ANC adopted its present name in 1923.
- King George, Emperor of India and King of the United Kingdom of Great Britain and Ireland and British Dominions beyond the Seas, departed from his Empire after a triumphant visit of more than one month, setting sail from Calcutta (now Kolkata) along with Queen Mary and his entourage.
- The National Monetary Commission presented its plan to United States Congress to establish what would become the Federal Reserve system, filing a report and the bill written by Nelson W. Aldrich.
- The common council in San Diego passed a resolution limiting public space for soap box presentations, a common means for local activists to communicate to local citizens, in response to citizen complaints that activist groups such as the Industrial Workers of the World were blocking traffic. The resolution initiated months of labor violence and vigilantism in San Diego before disappearing by the autumn.
- Born:
  - José Ferrer, American actor and director, best known for films The Shrike and The Great Man, recipient of both the Tony Award and the Academy Award for his portrayal of Cyrano de Bergerac, first Hispanic actor to receive the Academy Award for Best Actor and first actor to receive the National Medal of Arts; in San Juan, Puerto Rico (d. 1992).
  - Lawrence Walsh, Canadian-American lawyer, 5th United States Deputy Attorney General, head of the Independent Counsel for the Iran–Contra affair; in Port Maitland, Nova Scotia (d. 2014).

== January 9, 1912 (Tuesday) ==
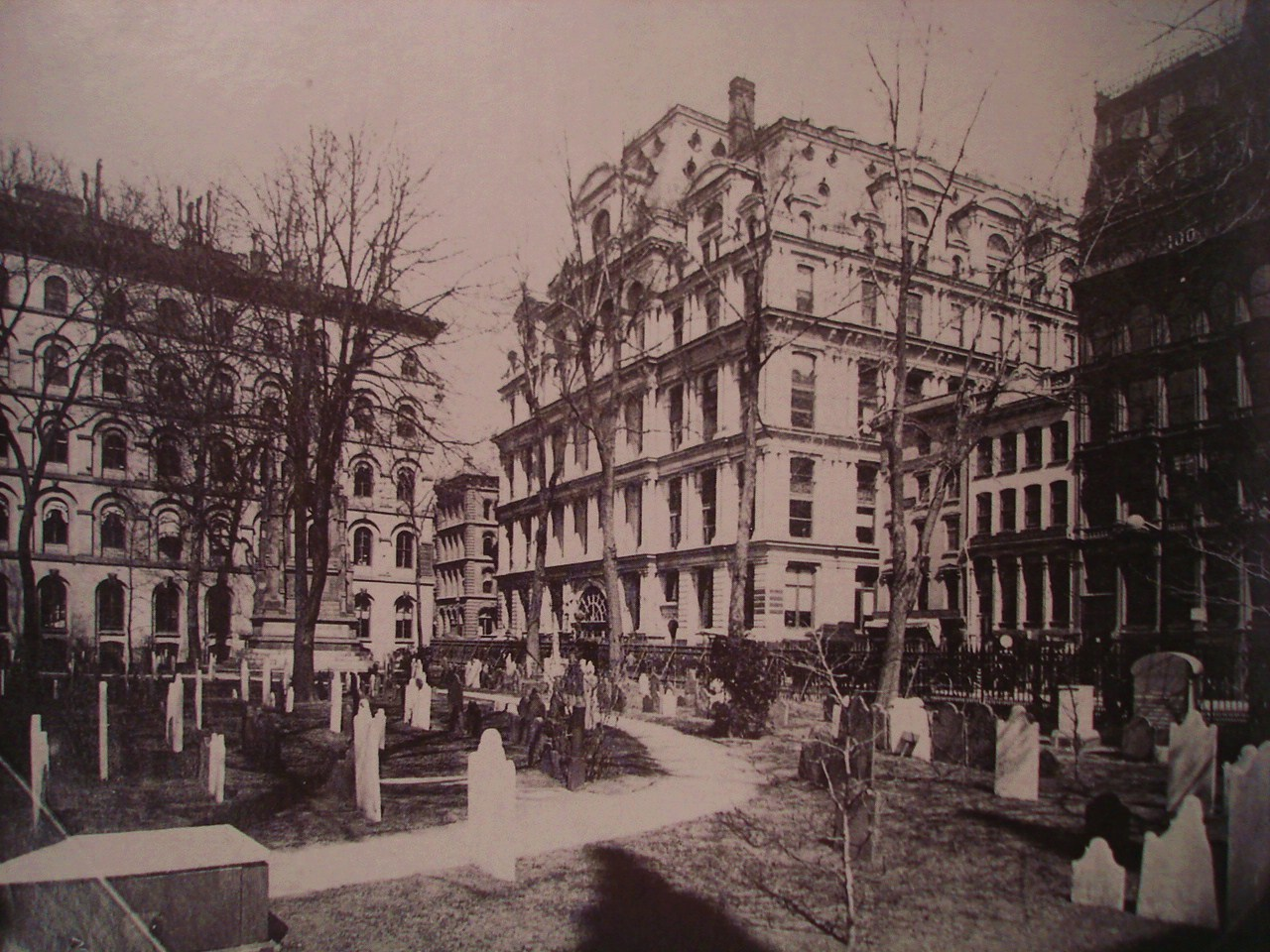
Equitable Life Assurance Building in 1870

- The 130-foot tall Equitable Building, New York City's first skyscraper, was destroyed by a fast moving fire, killing 6 people. The blaze had started at 5:00 in the morning and the offices of three of the nation's largest financial institutions — Equitable Life, Mercantile Safe Deposit, and many law firms — were destroyed. Fireproof vaults protected several billion dollars of securities, stocks and bonds from destruction.
- The Democratic National Committee announced that its presidential nominating convention would be held in Baltimore, Maryland on June 25, 1912.

== January 10, 1912 (Wednesday) ==
- The official results of the 1911 French Census were released. There were 39,601,509 French residents, an increase of 349,264 people from 39,252,245 in the 1906 Census.
- HMS Africa served as the first British aircraft carrier, as Charles Rumney Samson flew a Short biplane from the ship, anchored at Sheerness, England.
- Italian Army Captain Carlo Piazza dropped leaflets over Ottoman Army positions in Libya from an airplane during the Italo-Turkish War, the first time aircraft were used in a propaganda campaign.
- Glenn Curtiss piloted the first flight of a flying boat at Hammondsport, New York.
- The test flight for the Short Brothers tractor biplane was made by pilot Francis McClean in England.
- Died: Thomas Hardy, 81, Australian winemaker, credited as the "Father of the South Australian Wine Industry" (b. 1830).

== January 11, 1912 (Thursday) ==
Joseph Caillaux in 1912

- French Prime Minister Joseph Caillaux and his cabinet were forced to resign, two days after the French Senate concluded that he had secretly negotiated the give-away of French territory without the President's knowledge in working out a treaty with Germany. French Foreign Minister Justin de Selves declined to deny the accusations against Caillaux.
- The Russian steamer Russ, on its way across the Black Sea from Galați, Romania to Odessa, sank in with 172 people on board. Among the casualties were the new Consul General, Carl Anseff, and his family.
- Lawrence textile strike – Receiving their paychecks a day before the rest of the employees at the Everett Mills Company in Lawrence, Massachusetts, mostly Polish-speaking women employed as weavers found that the company had cut their pay (already low, ranging from 9 1/2 cents to 20 cents per hour) after a new state law had gone into effect limiting the work week to 54 hours. The women immediately walked off the job. The next day, the strike would spread to the other companies in the city.
- Born: Abdul Haq Akorwi, Pakistani theologian, founder of the Darul Uloom Haqqania seminary; in Akora Khattak, British India (d. 1988).

== January 12, 1912 (Friday) ==
- With 208 seats in the Reichstag at stake in the first round of the German parliamentary election, the Socialists won 64 of the seats and increased their margin by 26 while the government coalition lost 29. The second round was set for January 23, with 121 seats to be filled.
- The Lawrence textile strike began a day after the first group of textile workers in Lawrence, Massachusetts, received smaller paychecks, other employees at the Everett Mills got their reduced pay, and walked off the job. Employees at the other companies—American Woolen, Arlington Mills and Pacific Mills—followed suit. Men, women and children from 25 different nationalities defied attempts to break up the strike, holding out for nine weeks until March 13, when American Woolen agreed to the strikers' demands, raising wages by 5 to 25%, and giving 25% extra for overtime.
- The General Post Office of the British government assumed control of the National Telephone Company, "leaving the United States as the only major nation in which the network was privately owned."
- Professional ice hockey was played west of Toronto for the first time, and on artificial ice for the first time, in Victoria, British Columbia. The Victoria Senators lost to the New Westminster Royals, 8–3 in the initial game of the new Pacific Coast Hockey Association in Canada.
- The lowest temperatures ever measured in Iowa (-47 °F at Washta, matched on February 3, 1996, in Elkader) and in Minnesota (-40 °F in Pipestone) were recorded on the same day during the height of a cold wave across much of the northern United States. Pipestone also set the record for Minnesota's highest temperature (108 °F) on four occasions between 1930 and 1936.
- Beauregard Parish, Louisiana, with its county seat at DeRiddger, was created after being separated from Calcasieu Parish.

== January 13, 1912 (Saturday) ==
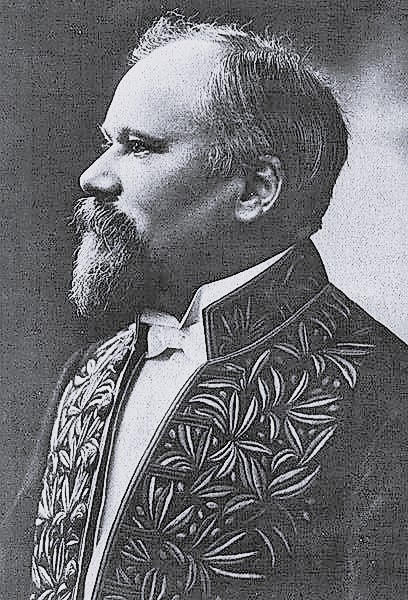
Raymond Poincaré

- At the request of French President Armand Fallières, Raymond Poincaré formed a new government with himself as Prime Minister and Foreign Minister of France.
- As a cold front swept the Atlantic states, Maryland measured its lowest temperature ever, in a record that still stood a century later: -40 °C/F in Oakland.
- The speed record for an airplane was broken, as Jules Védrines reached 88 mph in a flight at the Pau airfield in France in the new Deperdussin Monocoque airplane.
- Cattle baron John Beal Sneed shot and killed Albert Boyce, Sr., former manager of the famous XIT Ranch in the Texas panhandle, when the two crossed paths at the Metropolitan Hotel in Fort Worth, Texas. The two had been bitterly feuding when Sneed's wife Lenora had an affair with Boyce in late 1911. The murder kicked off one of the most sensational trials in the history of Texas up to that point and furthered the violent feuding between the two families which resulted in another six deaths.

== January 14, 1912 (Sunday) ==
- Spanish Prime Minister José Canalejas y Méndez resigned along with his cabinet, two days after the King Alfonso pardoned six of the seven rioters of Cullera, all of whom had been sentenced to death. Canalejas resumed office the next day with a new cabinet.
- Chinese revolutionary Tao Chengzhang was murdered while in bed in the Sainte-Marie Hospital in Shanghai.
- Born: Tillie Olsen, American writer, author of Tell Me a Riddle and Yonnondio; in Wahoo, Nebraska (d. 2007).

== January 15, 1912 (Monday) ==
- The United States Senate voted 58–8 to discuss arbitration treaties publicly rather than in closed sessions.
- The first Governor of New Mexico, William C. McDonald was sworn in eight days after statehood. He succeeded William J. Mills, who had served as the last Territorial Governor.
- The USS Maryland was dispatched to Ecuador to protect American interests there during its civil war.
- Camp Trouble, the first training site for U.S. Navy aviators, was opened on a peninsula in San Diego Bay, consisting of a set of tents and three airplanes. By May, all three of the planes had been wrecked, and the squadron was transferred to Annapolis, Maryland, on May 2, 1912.
- Oedipus Rex was presented in English for the first time, appearing at London's Royal Opera House.
- Born: Michel Debré, French state leader, first Prime Minister of France of the French Fifth Republic (from 1959 to 1962); in Paris (d. 1996).
- Died: Henry Labouchère, 80, English politician, Member of Parliament of Northampton from 1880 to 1906, author of the Labouchere Amendment which made homosexuality a crime in the United Kingdom (b. 1831).

== January 16, 1912 (Tuesday) ==
- The General Assembly of the Ottoman Empire was dissolved, three days after a proposed constitutional amendment that would allow Sultan Hamid to dissolve parliament in time of war, failed to receive more than 125 votes out of 188 that would have been necessary in the 376 member chamber.
- British Antarctic Expedition – One day away from the South Pole, Captain Robert Falcon Scott wrote in his journal, "The worst has happened, or nearly the worst." After starting the afternoon "in high spirits," the party saw "the remains of a camp; sledge tracks and ski tracks going and coming and the clear trace of dogs' paws- many dogs. This told us the whole story. The Norwegians have forestalled us and are first at the Pole."
- An attempt was made on the life of China's Premier Yuan Shikai. Three bombs were thrown at him as he was returning from an audience at the Imperial Palace in the Forbidden City. Yuan was unhurt, but twenty people around him were injured.
- A fifth film adaptation of the Strange Case of Dr Jekyll and Mr Hyde was released, with James Cruze in the title role and co-starring his wife Marguerite Snow, and directed by Lucius J. Henderson.
- Born: Nigel Dennis, English writer, author of Cards of Identity and The Making of Moo; in Bletchingley, Surrey (d. 1989).
- Died: Georg Heym, 24, German poet, promoter of early Expressionism in Germany, drowned while ice skating on the Havel river (b. 1887).

== January 17, 1912 (Wednesday) ==
- The British Antarctic Expedition, consisting of Robert Falcon Scott and his team of four explorers, reached the South Pole, only to find the flag of Norway that had been planted by the Norwegian Expedition led by Roald Amundsen. "The Pole," Scott wrote in his journal; "Yes, but under very different circumstances from those expected. We have had a horrible day." He added, "Great God! This is an awful place and terrible enough for us to have laboured to it without the reward of priority. Well, it is something to have got here. Now for the run home and a desperate struggle. I wonder if we can do it."
- French scientist Alexis Carrel, working at the Rockefeller Institute in New York City, removed a piece of the heart of a chicken embryo, then kept the fragment alive for the remaining 32 years of his life. Carrel, who won the Nobel Prize later in the year (though not for the experiment), died on November 5, 1944. The tissue lasted until September 1946.
- France's Chamber of Deputies overwhelmingly approved the new government of Prime Minister Raymond Poincaré by a vote of 440–6.

== January 18, 1912 (Thursday) ==
- Over 1,000 people in Ecuador were killed in the fighting between troops from the Quito national government and the Guayaquil rebel government at Yaguachi, northeast of Guayaquil. General Julio Andrade, leader of the Quito troops, defeated the rebels. General Flavio Alfaro, commander of the rebel troops, was wounded.
- The ship Wistow Hall with 57 people on board, sank in a gale off of the coast of Aberdeenshire, Scotland. Only the captain and three other people were saved.
- The United States Army began a presence in China that would last for the next 26 years, as the 15th U.S. Infantry landed at Qinhuangdao and then set up a permanent station at Tianjin.
- The results of the British Miners' Federation vote on a strike were released, showing 445,801 in favor and 115,921 against. The strike, aimed at securing a minimum wage for coal miners, would begin on March 1 and last until April 4, 1912.
- A mass protest involving 10,000 people was held in Brisbane over the dismissal of members of the Australian Tramway and Motor Omnibus Employees' Association for wearing union badges while working. Members formally voted to go on strike by January 30.
- Vladimir Lenin and the Bolshevik Party broke away from the rest of the Russian Social Democratic Labour Party during the Prague Conference and formed their own political party.
- U.S. President William Howard Taft pardoned Charles W. Morse after the Wall Street financier had served more than a year of a 15-year prison sentence, upon being advised that Morse was terminally ill. Morse recovered and outlived Taft, dying in 1933.
- Born: Ivan Getting, American physicist and engineer, co-creator of the Global Positioning System (GPS); in New York City (d. 2003).

== January 19, 1912 (Friday) ==
- British Antarctic Expedition – In despair over having been beaten to the South Pole by Roald Amundsen of Norway, exhausted and with limited supplies, Robert Falcon Scott and his four fellow explorers set off on a 900-mile (1,400 km) journey northward to their base. Caught in unusually cold weather, none of them would survive.
- Gerard H. L. Fitzwilliams and F. B. L. Bowley received their seats on the Hong Kong sanitary board by acclamation in the local election.
- The All-Russian Football Union, the precursor to the Russian Football Union, was established in Moscow.
- Born: Leonid Kantorovich, Soviet Russian mathematician, recipient of the Nobel Memorial Prize in Economic Sciences for developing linear programming; in Saint Petersburg (d. 1986).

== January 20, 1912 (Saturday) ==
- The first successful strike in Mexican history was settled after 25 days, as company owners agreed to reduce the workday to ten hours and increase weekly wages by ten percent.
- The second round of Reichstag elections began, with 77 seats, followed by 80 on Monday and concluding with 34 on January 25.

== January 21, 1912 (Sunday) ==
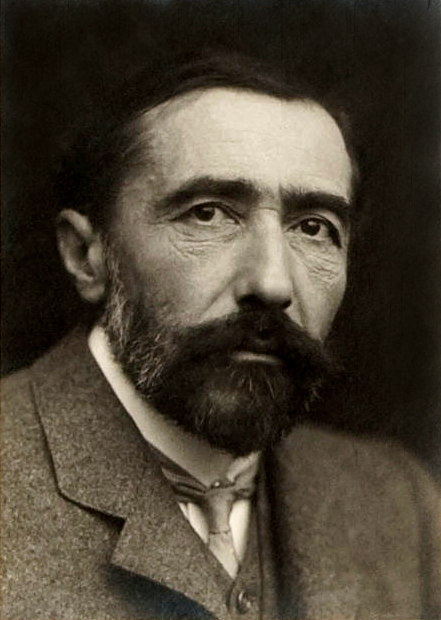
Joseph Conrad

- Joseph Conrad achieved his first popular success as the New York Herald began serializing his novel Chance, having bought the rights to the unfinished work, halted in 1906, in June 1911. Conrad continued to work on finishing the book while the first chapters were appearing weekly in the Herald, completing it on March 26.
- Two days after a woman and her four children in Crowley, Louisiana, were hacked to death in their home by the killer later dubbed the "Mulatto Ax Murderer," Felix Broussard, his wife and three children were killed in similar fashion in Lake Charles, about 50 miles (80 km) west. Six people had been killed in November in Lafayette, 25 miles (40 km) to the west of Crowley. The killings had started in January 1911 in Rayne, 15 miles (24 km) from Crowley, and occurred in Texas as well. The Broussard killings marked 24 murders to that point.
- Born:
  - Konrad Emil Bloch, German-American biochemist, recipient of the Nobel Prize in Physiology or Medicine for his research into cholesterol and fatty acid metabolism; in Neisse, German Empire (now Nysa, Poland) (d. 2000)
  - Laurence Whistler, British poet and artist, known for his glass work for the British royal family, recipient of the Order of the British Empire; in Hampshire, England (d. 2000)

== January 22, 1912 (Monday) ==
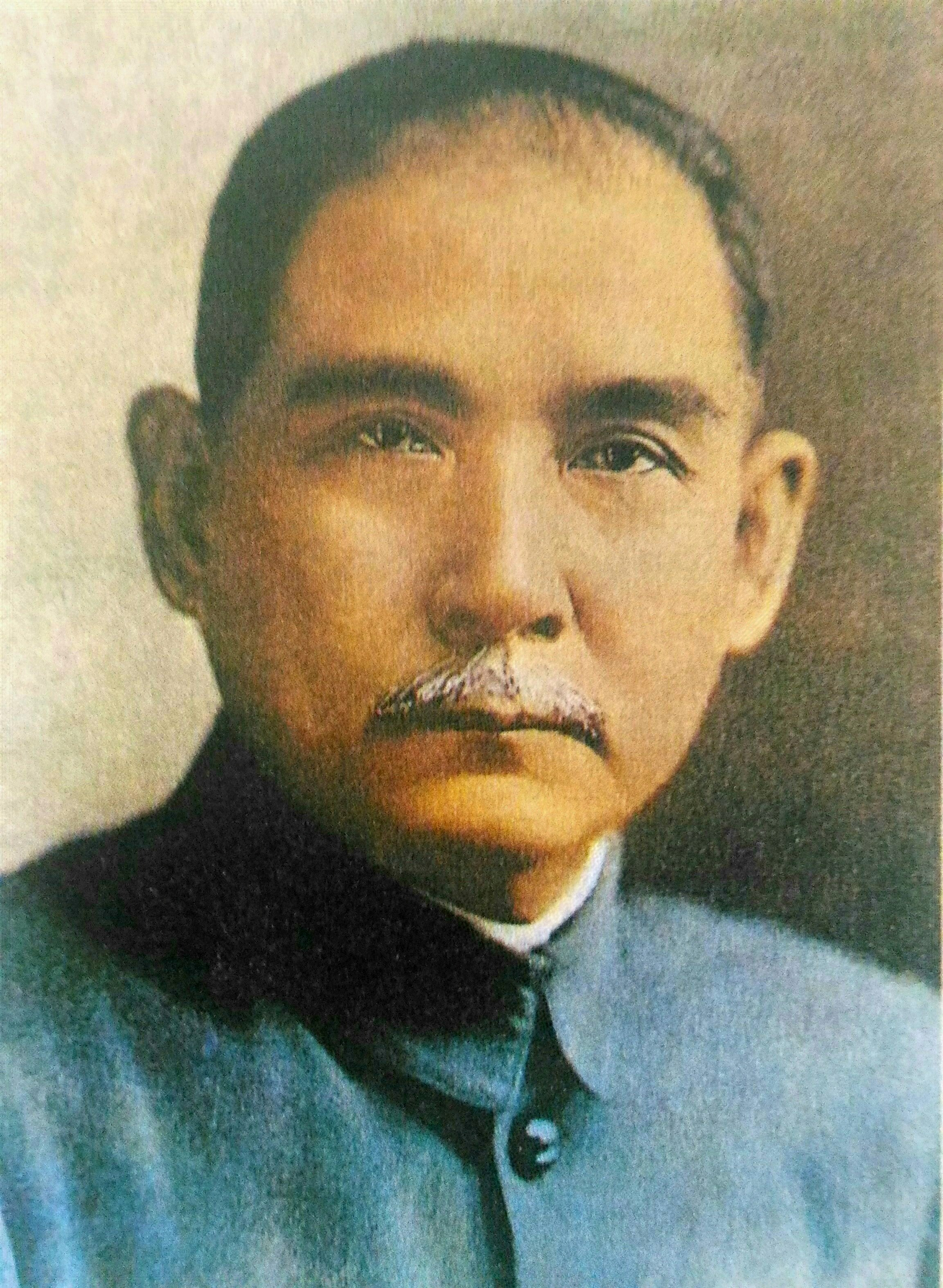
Sun Yat-sen

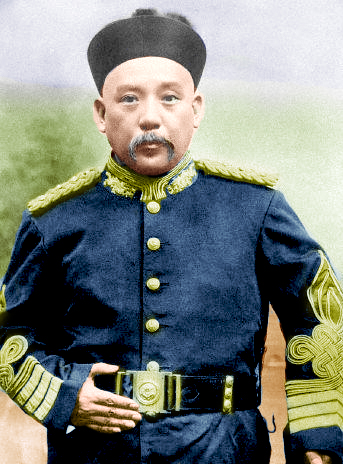
Yuan Shih-kai

- Sun Yat-sen and Yuan Shikai completed their negotiations on the unification of the Republic of China and the area in Northern China, with Dr. Sun agreeing to yield the presidency to Yuan upon the abdication of the Emperor.
- Four black residents were lynched in Hamilton, Georgia, following the alleged murder of a white landowner, who in some historical accounts had been a notorious sexual predator of black women in Harris County, Georgia.
- The Overseas Railroad carried its first passengers from Palm Beach to Key West with the completion of the six-year construction of the Key West Extension of the Florida East Coast Railway. Henry Flagler, the railway's owner, financed the seemingly impossible project of building bridges and landfill to lay 169 miles of railroad tracks across the waters to link the islands of the Florida Keys. Flagler, 82, arrived with the other passengers at 10:43 a.m. to a cheering crowd of 10,000 people, and told the gathering, "Now I can die happy. My dream is fulfilled." He would pass away 1 year and 4 months later.
- Former Illinois Central Railroad company President J.T. Harahan and three other passengers were killed in a wreck near Kinmundy, Illinois, when the private car of Vice-President F.O. Melcher of the Rock Island line was struck from behind by another train.
- Born: Demetrios Capetanakis, Greek poet, known for his poetry collection A Greek Poet In England; in Smyrna, Ottoman Empire (d. 1944).

== January 23, 1912 (Tuesday) ==
- The First International Opium Convention was signed at The Hague by 12 nations. The signatories resolved to work toward "the gradual suppression of the abuse of opium, morphine, cocaine, as also of the drugs prepared or derived from these substances which give rise or might give rise to similar abuses."
- The town of Forgan, Oklahoma, was incorporated as the end of the line for the Wichita Falls & Northwestern Railroad Company.

== January 24, 1912 (Wednesday) ==
- An earthquake measuring 6.5 in magnitude struck the Greek island of Zakynthos, killing 51 people.
- Ripudaman Singh became the Maharaja of the Indian principality of Nabha. The Sikh leader was forced to abdicate by the British authorities on July 7, 1923.
- Died: James Allen, 47, British philosopher, pioneer in the concept of self-help in his book As a Man Thinketh (b. 1864).

== January 25, 1912 (Thursday) ==
- General Pedro Montero, who had been proclaimed President of Ecuador on December 29, 1911, by rebelling Ecuadorian troops, was sentenced to 16 years in prison following his court-martial in Guayaquil. Montero had been captured in battle three days earlier on January 22. After former president Leónidas Plaza announced the military court's decision to the crowd outside of the Government Palace, several members of the crowd outside rushed inside and shot General Montero to death. They carried his corpse outside, where the mob beheaded and burned it in a bonfire.
- Norwegian Antarctic Expedition – Roald Amundsen and his team of four men arrived back at their base at Framheim on the Bay of Whales, along with eleven surviving dogs. They left Antarctica on the Fram five days later.
- Voting in elections for the Reichstag concluded, with the Socialists having the largest number of seats—100 out of 397—and the Radical and National Liberal parties having 44 and 47, for a total of 191 seats, still short of a majority. Chancellor Theobald von Bethmann Hollweg was able to find a new government.
- Karl Grulich, German aviator, tripled the record for staying aloft with multiple passengers, flying for 1 hour and 35 minutes in a Harlan monoplane over Johannistal, Germany. The prior record had been 31 minutes by Frenchman M. Busson on March 10, 1911, over Reims, France.

== January 26, 1912 (Friday) ==
- A group of 47 generals and commanders of China's Imperial Army, all of whom had pledged their allegiance to the monarchy earlier in the month, signed a petition to the Emperor and the regent, asking that the Manchu rulers give way to a republic under Yuan Shikai. "This memorial dealt a lethal blow to the dynasty," an author would note later.
- Demolition began on the Caños de Carmona, an ancient Roman aqueduct spanning 17.5 kilometres in length from Seville to Carmona, Spain. Three portions were rescued from the wrecking ball and preserved.
- The American Civil War drama For the Cause of the South was released by Edison Studios. The film was directed by Bannister Merwin and featured James Gordon as Confederate General Robert E. Lee. The film is now considered lost and may have been destroyed when a fire destroyed one of Edison facilities in 1914.
- In Walla Walla, Washington, Assistant Fire Chief Robert J. Wolf was killed after becoming trapped in the basement of the Jones Building while fighting a fire.

== January 27, 1912 (Saturday) ==
- According to his own letter to the magazine Popular Astronomy, amateur astronomer Frank B. Harris was observing through his telescope and saw an object crossing the Moon, which he described as something that "was fully as black comparatively as marks on this paper, and in shape like a crow poised." Harris estimated it as being 250 miles long and 50 miles wide. Although nobody else reported witnessing the phenomenon, the story has been repeated in the decades that followed. The briefly reported event has been described as something "that launched the 'modern' period of anomalous lunar happenings."
- Born:
  - Marc Daniels, American television director, best known for directing of landmark television programs including the sitcom I Love Lucy and Star Trek; in Pittsburgh (d. 1989).
  - Arne Næss, Norwegian philosopher, founder of deep ecology; in Slemdal (d. 2009).
  - Francis Rogallo, American aeronautical engineer, inventor of the Rogallo wing; in Sanger, California (d. 2009).

== January 28, 1912 (Sunday) ==
- A mob in Quito, Ecuador stormed the penitentiary where former President Eloy Alfaro and his brothers Flavio and Medardo had been held as prisoners of war since their capture on January 22, 1912. Eloy, who had been the 15th President of Ecuador and had served from 1895 to 1901, and again from 1906 to 1911, and Flavio, who had been proclaimed president by rebels in Guayaquil, were lynched along with the others. The resulting violence instigated the Concha Revolution.
- The Lin-shih ts'an-i-yuan, also known as the Nanking Assembly and the first legislature for the Republic of China, convened at Nanjing with representatives from all of the provinces.
- United States Secretary of War Henry L. Stimson recommended closing of 16 U.S. Army posts in favor of concentrating troops at eight strategic points.
- Polar explorer Lieutenant Nobu Shirase and his 27-man team reached a point at the South Pole 80 degrees 5' south and 156 degrees 37' in Antarctica and named it Yamato Sekihara, completing the main objective of the Japanese Antarctic Expedition.
- Hungarian figure skater Opika von Méray Horváth won gold at the Ladies World Figure Skating Championships in Davos, Switzerland, the first of three consecutive world titles.
- Born:
  - Jackson Pollock, American artist, leading developer of abstract expressionism in the U.S.; in Cody, Wyoming (killed in auto accident, 1956).
  - Sidney Lens (pen name for Sidney Okun), American writer, author of The Day Before Doomsday; in Newark, New Jersey (d. 1986).
  - Louis Wolfson, American financier, considered one of the first to practice corporate raiding; in St. Louis (d. 2007).
- Died: Gustave de Molinari, 92, Belgian economist, one of the proponents of laissez-faire economics (b. 1819).

== January 29, 1912 (Monday) ==
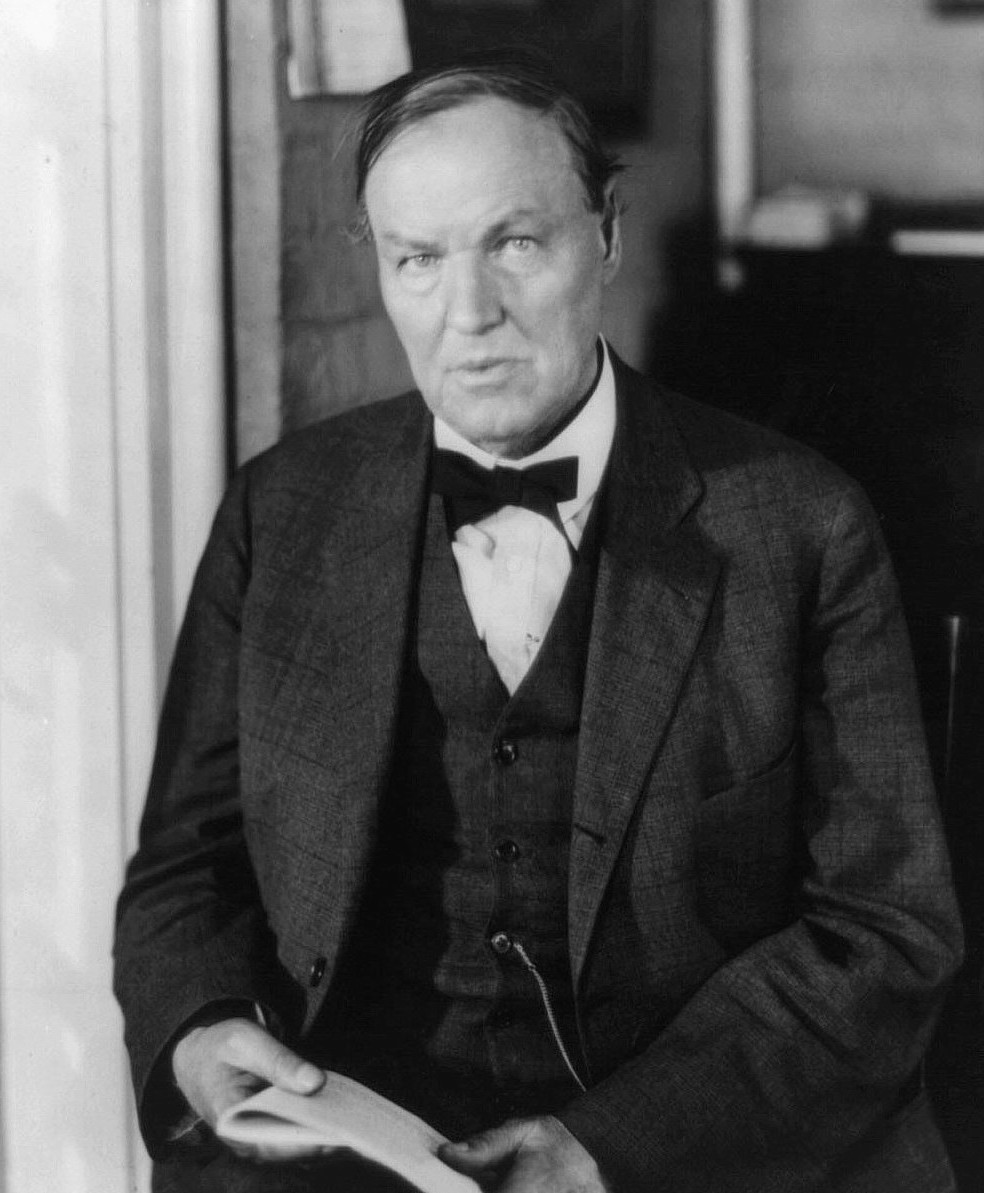
Clarence Darrow

- Lawrence textile strike – Anna LoPizzo, a member of the Lawrence textile strike group, was shot dead by police officer Oscar Benoit when the strike parade was charged by local militia.
- Renowned trial lawyer Clarence Darrow was indicted by a grand jury in Los Angeles, on charges of attempted bribery of a juror in the case that he was defending for J.B. McNamara. Arrested, he was released on $20,000 bail. Darrow would be acquitted in August 1912 after a three-month trial. In a separate case, the jury deadlocked with eight of twelve jurors. The district attorney agreed not to renew the charges as long as Darrow agreed never to practice in California again.
- Born: Martha Griffiths, American politician, first female U.S. Representative for Michigan, serving from 1955 to 1974; in Pierce City, Missouri (d. 2003).
- Died: Alexander Duff, 62, British noble, husband of Louise Victoria, Princess Royal of the United Kingdom, of pleurisy at Aswan, Egypt (b. 1849).

== January 30, 1912 (Tuesday) ==
- In an interview with the Chicago Evening Post, former U.S. President Theodore Roosevelt announced for the first time that he would accept the nomination for the presidency, though he would not actively seek a return to the White House.
- The Norwegian Antarctic Expedition came to an end as Roald Amundsen and the crew of the Fram departed northward from Antarctica, bound for Buenos Aires.
- Born:
  - Werner Hartmann, German physicist, developer of microelectronics; in Berlin-Friedenau (d. 1988).
  - Barbara W. Tuchman, American historian, recipient of the Pulitzer Prize for The Guns of August and Stilwell; in New York City (d. 1989).
  - Francis Schaeffer, American theologian, founder of L'Abri; in Philadelphia (d. 1984).
- Died:
  - Luis Cordero Crespo, 78, the 14th President of Ecuador (1892-1895) (b. 1833).
  - Florence St. John, 56, English singer and actress, best known for leading roles with the D'Oyly Carte Opera Company (b. 1855).

== January 31, 1912 (Wednesday) ==
- Captain Carlo Montu of the Italian Army became the first pilot to be wounded in combat, after he was struck by anti-aircraft fire from Ottoman forces.
- Githa Sowerby's drama Rutherford and Son premièred at the Royal Court Theatre in London.
- British songwriter and music hall performer Jack Judge performed "It's a Long Way to Tipperary" for the first time at the Grand Theater in Stalybridge, England, following a five shilling bet the day before that he could write a song overnight.The song proved popular and was recorded by John McCormack in 1914 at the start of World War I, making it a staple wartime song.
- Born:
  - Camilo Ponce Enríquez, the 30th President of Ecuador (1956-1960); in Quito, Ecuador (d. 1976).
  - Maria Adelaide de Bragança, Portuguese noble, daughter of Duke Miguel and Princess Maria Theresa; in Saint-Jean-de-Luz, France (d. 2012).
