= December 1911 =

Month of 1911

<<	December 1911					>>
Su	Mo	Tu	We	Th	Fr	Sa
					1	2
3	4	5	6	7	8	9
10	11	12	13	14	15	16
17	18	19	20	21	22	23
24	25	26	27	28	29	30
31

December 14, 1911: Five men from Norway first to reach the South Pole

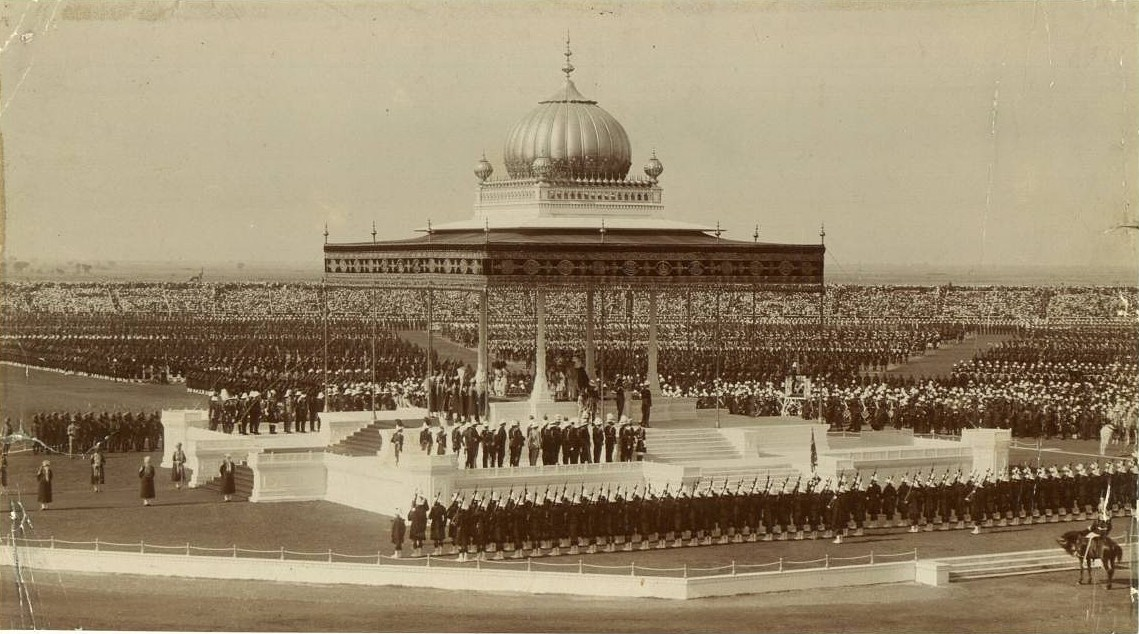
December 12, 1911: George VI of Great Britain and Ireland crowned at Delhi as Emperor of India

The following events occurred in December 1911:

== December 1, 1911 (Friday) ==
- At Urga (now Ulan Bator), a new Mongolian Empire was declared independent from the Chinese Empire. Chinese officials of the Qing dynasty were expelled from what had been "Outer Mongolia", and set up its own government on the 11th day of the First Winter Month of the year of the Pig. Unlike other provinces of China that would become part of the Republic of China, Mongolia remained a separate nation.
- James B. McNamara and John J. McNamara stunned Americans who had been following their trial for murder, when James pleaded guilty to the dynamiting of the Los Angeles Times building on October 1, 1910, and John, the secretary-treasurer of the International Association of Bridge and Structural Iron Workers, pleaded to having caused an explosion at the Llewellyn Iron Works. Chief counsel Clarence Darrow explained the plea, saying, "From the first, there was never the slightest chance to win," adding, "There was overwhelming evidence of all kinds which no one could have surmounted if he would." James was sentenced to life imprisonment and his brother John to 15 years.
- The First International Opium Conference opened at the Hague. The United States, United Kingdom, China, France, Germany, Italy, Japan, Netherlands, Persia (Iran), Portugal, Russia, and Siam (Thailand), sent representatives, presided over by Bishop Charles H. Brent, Episcopal bishop for the Philippines.
- Born: Walter Alston, American baseball manager who guided the Brooklyn Dodgers and then the Los Angeles Dodgers to four World Series championships; in Venice, Ohio (d. 1984).

== December 2, 1911 (Saturday) ==
- King Vajiravudh of Siam (now Thailand) was crowned in Bangkok.
- George V, who was not only the King of the United Kingdom, but also the Emperor of India (at that time a British colony), arrived at Bombay (now Mumbai), becoming the first British monarch to visit British India.
- The Australasian Antarctic Expedition, commanded by Douglas Mawson, began with the departure of the Aurora from Hobart, for the purpose of mapping the uncharted coastline of Antarctica directly south of Australia.
- Eladio Victoria was elected as President of the Dominican Republic.

== December 3, 1911 (Sunday) ==
- Maurice Prevost and a passenger reached an altitude of 9,800 feet over Courcy, France, breaking the record of 8,471 feet set the year before by Ralph Johnstone.
- The "General Plan for the Organization of the Provisional Government" was promulgated by China's Republican revolutionaries, proposing an American-style presidential system. On March 11, 1912, the Provisional Constitution would change to a cabinet system headed by a Prime Minister.
- Born: Nino Rota, Italian film score composer; in Milan (d. 1979).

== December 4, 1911 (Monday) ==
- A mosque was bombed in Istib, at the time a European possession of the Ottoman Empire, and now Štip in North Macedonia, killing 12 Muslim worshipers and wounding 20, leading to the outbreak of rioting. The Turkish Army retaliated by attacking Bulgarian nationalists whom they blamed for the bombing, wounding 171, of whom 14 died.
- An antitrust suit was brought against the National Cash Register company, alleging conspiracy to restrain trade. NCR had 95% of cash register sales in the U.S.
- John D. Rockefeller resigned as President of the company that he had founded, the recently dismembered Standard Oil Company, and John D. Archibold succeeded him.

== December 5, 1911 (Tuesday) ==
- Voters in Los Angeles rejected the prospect of electing a Socialist government, four days after the surprise conviction of the McNamara brothers. Mayor George Alexander, whose re-election had been uncertain, defeated Job Harriman by a more than 2-1 margin, and voters rejected the entire slate of city councilmen and Board of Education members.
- The Aerial Experiment Association, headed by aviator Glenn Curtiss, was awarded U.S. Patent No. 1,011,106 for the aileron (which controls the rolling and turning of an aircraft) after being successful in litigation against the Wright Brothers.
- The town of Blackdom, New Mexico, an all-black community located in Chaves County, was incorporated. The town was abandoned in the 1920s.
- Joseph Stalin was sent into exile for his third and final time, being sent to Vologda for a five-year stretch.
- Born:
  - Władysław Szpilman, Polish Jewish composer and pianist who avoided capture during the Holocaust; in Sosnowiec. His story was dramatized in the film The Pianist (d. 2000).
  - Carlos Marighella, Brazilian guerilla leader, in Salvador, Bahia state (killed, 1969).

== December 6, 1911 (Wednesday) ==
- Prince Chun, the regent for (and father of) the Emperor of China, resigned from office. He was succeeded by Prince Shi-Hsu, former National Assembly president, and Hsu Shi-Chang, VP of the Privy Council.
- Western Union introduced discount rates for its trans-Atlantic cable service between New York and London.

== December 7, 1911 (Thursday) ==
- More than 150 construction workers were killed in the collapse of a bridge over Russia's Volga River at Kazan. Pressured by a buildup of ice, the supports for the structure gave way without warning, throwing the men into the icy waters.
- The New Zealand Liberal Party, headed by Prime Minister Joseph Ward, lost its majority of 50 of the 80 seats in Parliament, falling to 33. The Reform Party won 37, and, after the Liberals were unable to maintain a government, captured the post of premier under William Massey.
- The mandatory requirement for Chinese men to wear their hair in a queue was abolished by Imperial edict, and provisions were announced for implementing the Western calendar.

== December 8, 1911 (Friday) ==
- Thirteen years after the destruction of the USS Maine in the Havana Harbor, a committee of naval experts concluded that the blast was, as originally suspected, caused by an external explosion which had ignited munitions stored on board.
- The San Francisco Symphony, conducted by Henry Kimball Hadley, held its first concert.
- Born: Lee J. Cobb (stage name for Leo Jacoby), American stage, film and TV actor known for starring in TV western series The Virginian; in New York City (d. 1976).

== December 9, 1911 (Saturday) ==
- The Cross Mountain Mine disaster killed 84 coal miners in the explosion of the Knoxville Iron and Coal Company's mine at Briceville, Tennessee. Shortly after their shift had started, the blast occurred at 7:30 am, entombing all but five survivors.
- Russia's ambassador in Tehran delivered an ultimatum to the government of Persia, demanding that it dismiss W. Morgan Shuster within 48 hours, and pledge not to hire foreign subjects without the consent of Russia and Britain. The Persians initially ignored the demand.
- Born: Broderick Crawford, American film (All the King's Men) and TV (Highway Patrol) actor (d. 1986).

== December 10, 1911 (Sunday) ==
- Dante's Inferno, a 69-minute (five reel) silent film based on the 14th Century vision of Hell written by Dante Alighieri, premiered at the Gane's Manhattan Theater in New York. Bringing the Devil to the silver screen for the first time, the Italian made film was a success.
- Convicted Los Angeles Times bombers J.B. McNamara and J.J. McNamara began their sentence at San Quentin Prison in California.
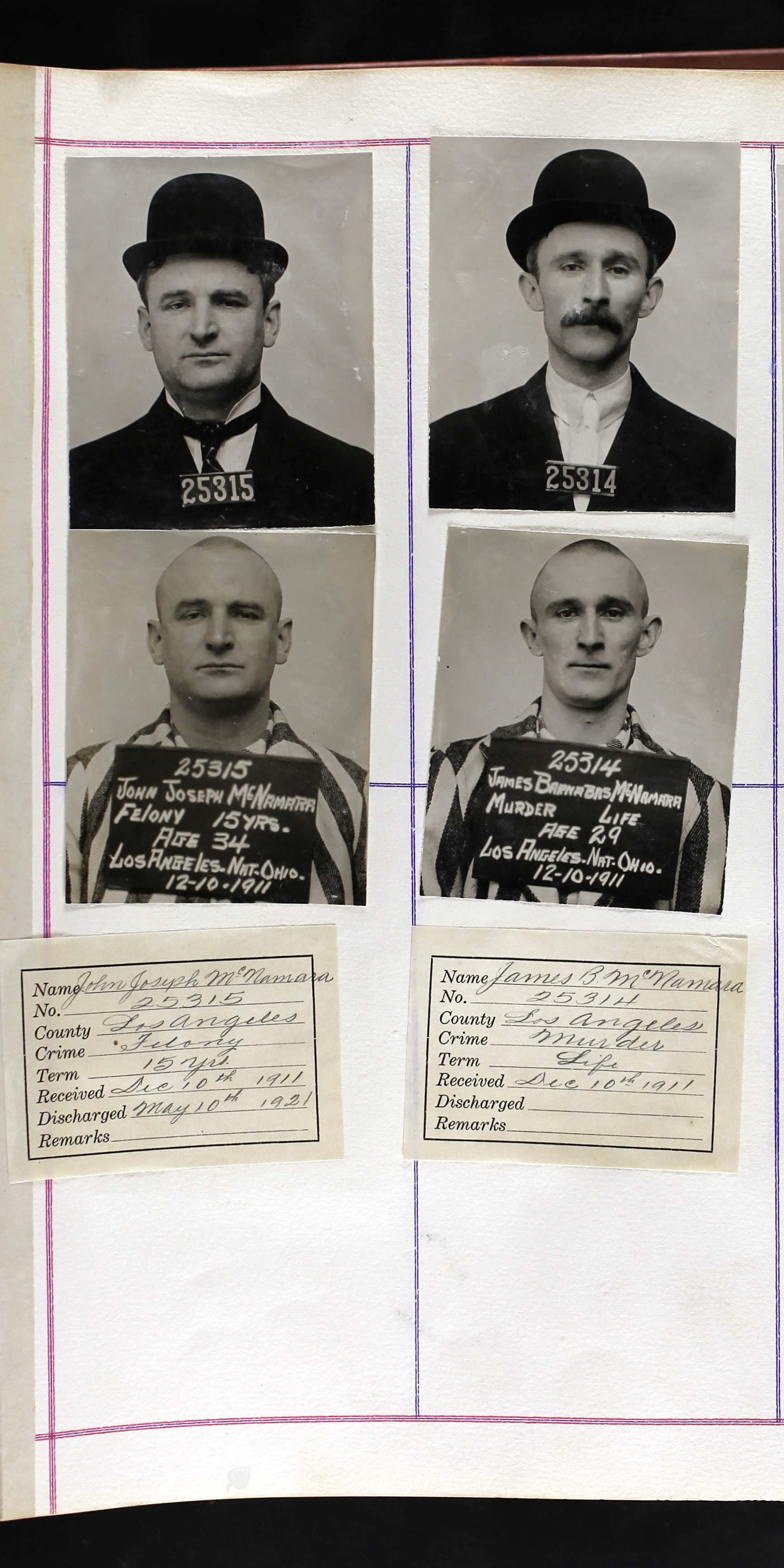
  John Joseph McNamara and James Barnabas McNamara mug shots
- Born: Chet Huntley, American newscaster who co-anchored NBC's evening news program, The Huntley-Brinkley Report, from 1956 to 1970; in Cardwell, Montana (d. 1974).
- Died: Joseph Dalton Hooker, 94, British explorer and botanist.

== December 11, 1911 (Monday) ==
- Fourteen people were killed and 30 injured in the derailment of a train near the Portuguese city of Porto, after the cars fell into the Douro River.
- The city of Tabriz in northwest of Iran was invaded by Russian troops during a campaign to suppress pro-constitutional movement.
- Born:
  - Qian Xuesen (Hsue-Shen Tsien), Chinese rocket scientist who had helped found the Jet Propulsion Laboratory in the United States before becoming the "Father of Chinese Rocketry" for Communist China; in Shanghai (d. 2009).
  - Val Guest (stage name for Valmond Grossman), British film director; in London (d. 2006).
  - Naguib Mahfouz, Egyptian novelist and winner of the 1988 Nobel Prize for Literature; in Cairo (d. 2006).
- Died: Victor Lemoine, 88, French flower breeder who created the French lilac.

== December 12, 1911 (Tuesday) ==
- At the Coronation Durbar in British India, King George V was formally proclaimed the Kaisar-i-Hind, King-Emperor of India, at Delhi, before an audience of 80,000. On the subcontinent, he had 315,000,000 subjects in the Indian Kingdom and Empire, which included modern-day India, Pakistan and Bangladesh. (At the time, the population of the British Isles was 45,370,530). The Emperor announced, without consultation of the British Parliament, that the capital of British India would be moved from Calcutta to a new city built near Delhi. New Delhi was built on the site southwest of Shahjahanabaad, the capital of the Mughal Emperors from 1658 to 1739, and finally and inaugurated on February 13, 1931.
- A bill proposed by U.S. Representative Isaac Sherwood, to provide a pension of $15 to $30 a month to every American military veteran, passed the House, 229-92.
- Voters in the Arizona Territory elected to eliminate the provision in the proposed constitution for judicial recall, by a margin of 14,963 to 1,980 and cleared the last impediment for President Taft to sign the statehood bill. Arizona would become the 48th state in February.
- Born: Margo Jones, American stage director credited with launching "regional theater" in the United States; in Livingston, Texas (died by accidental poisoning, 1955).

== December 13, 1911 (Wednesday) ==
- The House passed the Sulzer Resolution, asking for abrogation of the 1832 treaty with Russia due to its discrimination against American Jews, by a margin of 300-1. The lone dissent came from Congressman George R. Malby of New York.
- Five German nationals, convicted of espionage for Britain, were sentenced by a German court in Leipzig to prison terms ranging from 2 to 12 years. The maximum sentence was for a Herr Hipsich, an engineer at the Bremen shipyards, who sold plans for the new German dreadnoughts to the British.
- Born:
  - Trygve Haavelmo, Norwegian economist, winner of the 1989 Nobel Prize in Economics; in Skedsmo (d. 1999).
  - Kenneth Patchen, American poet; in Niles, Ohio (d. 1972).

== December 14, 1911 (Thursday) ==
- The South Pole was reached by human beings for the first time, as the Norwegian Antarctic Expedition arrived at 3:00 in the afternoon. The weather was sunny, winds were slight, and the temperature only -10 °F. Roald Amundsen, the leader of the expedition, was accompanied by Olav Bjaaland, Helmer Hanssen, Sverre Hassel and Oscar Wisting, and all five planted the Norwegian flag. They pitched a tent and remained for three days at their settlement, which they called Polheim, on the plateau that they named for King Haakon VII of Norway.
- At the same time, the British Antarctic Expedition, led by Robert Falcon Scott, was continuing its ascent of the Beardmore Glacier. At 84°8', and unaware that Amundsen was at the South Pole, Scott wrote in his journal, ironically, "It is splendid to be getting along and to find some adequate return for the work we are putting into the business."
- Dr. Eleanor Davies-Colley became the first woman to be admitted as Fellow of the Royal College of Surgeons in Britain.
- Born: Hans von Ohain, German engineer who patented the jet engine; in Dessau (d. 1998).

== December 15, 1911 (Friday) ==
- Anti-aircraft warfare was pioneered by Turkish troops in Libya, two weeks after Italy pioneered aerial bombardment.
- British suffragettes began a new tactic, destroying mailboxes in order to attract attention to their cause. Emily Wilding Davison saturated a piece of linen with paraffin, set it on fire, and placed it into a public mail drop. By July, the group began setting fire to unoccupied buildings.
- The North Pacific Fur Seal Convention of 1911, signed by the U.S., U.K., Japan, and Russia on July 7, went into effect.
- Born: Stan Kenton, American bandleader; in Wichita, Kansas (d. 1979).

== December 16, 1911 (Saturday) ==
- The Javzundamba Khutagt, spiritual leader of Mongolia's Buddhists, was proclaimed as the Bogd Khan, Emperor of Mongolia.
- Britain's National Health Insurance Act received royal assent.
- Khalifa bin Harub of Zanzibar was proclaimed as Sultan Khalifa II of Zanzibar upon the abdication of his cousin, Ali bin Hamud.
- British Chancellor of the Exchequer David Lloyd George was struck in the face by a man who threw a "brass bound box" at the future Prime Minister as Lloyd George was departing a meeting of supporters of women's suffrage. The assailant, 18-year-old Allan McDougall, was sentenced to two months hard labor.

== December 17, 1911 (Sunday) ==
- Pope Pius X broke a centuries-old tradition of Pontiffs always partaking of their meals alone. Following the ceremony for the consecration of two new cardinals, the Pope invited everyone to breakfast.

== December 18, 1911 (Monday) ==
- With the encouragement of Russia, leaders of the Tuvan minority declared the independence of their homeland, Tannu Tuva, from China. The mostly rural state on the Chinese-Russian border became a Russian protectorate in 1914 and was later annexed into the Soviet Union, and is now a part of the Russian Federation.
- Born: Jules Dassin, American film director who was blacklisted during the era of McCarthyism; in Middletown, Connecticut (d. 2008).

== December 19, 1911 (Tuesday) ==
- U.S. President William H. Taft asked Congress to rescind the commercial treaty that the U.S. had made with Russia more than 70 years prior. The termination was ratified unanimously (72-0) by the U.S. Senate, and the next day by the House with only one dissenting vote, from Robert B. Macon of Arkansas.
- Two thousand physicians met at Queen's Hall in London to protest against the limitations for payment under the Insurance Act.

== December 20, 1911 (Wednesday) ==
- The Agadir Crisis came to an end as the Chamber of Deputies of France approved the Moroccan agreement with Germany by a vote of 393-36, but 141 of the deputies abstained. The matter then moved on to the French Senate.
- Votes were counted in the New Zealand election, with Prime Minister Ward's party losing its majority in Parliament.
- Born: Hortense Calisher, American writer; in New York City (d. 2009).

== December 21, 1911 (Thursday) ==
- The Illinois Supreme Court became the first in the United States to uphold the admissibility of fingerprint evidence, affirming the murder conviction of Thomas Jennings. Jennings was hanged on February 16, 1912. By 1925, all state courts had followed the reasoning in People v. Jennings.
- The first armed robbery using a "getaway car" took place in Paris as four members of the Bonnot Gang used a stolen limousine to escape after robbing a courier who was bringing cash to the Société Générale Bank. Octave Garnier and Raymond Callemin stepped from the vehicle and confronted the courier and his bodyguard with pistols, shot him when he resisted, stole a case with money and hopped back in the car. Driver and gangleader Jules Bonnot then raced away.
- Russian troops arrived at the Persian city of Tabriz, and exacted vengeance on the civilian population after having battled Persian troops earlier. In taking control of government buildings, the Russians reportedly attacked schoolchildren and women. The next day, bombardment of the Northern Iranian city began, and on Saturday, mosques and other buildings were burnt down.
- Explorer Hiram Bingham returned to the United States and gave reporters their first interview concerning his expedition to Peru.
- Born: Josh Gibson, African-American baseball player who hit 800 home runs in his career, mostly for the Homestead Grays in the Negro leagues; in Buena Vista, Georgia. He would be admitted to the Baseball Hall of Fame in 1972. (d. 1947).
- Died: Emilio Estrada, 56, President of Ecuador since September, died of a heart attack.

== December 22, 1911 (Friday) ==
- Persia agreed to dismiss W. Morgan Shuster from his job as Treasurer, capitulating to the ultimatum made by Russia.
- The British steamer Menzaleh was seized in the Red Sea by the Italian Navy warship Puglia, along with its cargo of $150,000 worth of gold coins. The Menzaleh had passed through the Suez Canal been on its way to the Turkish port of Hodeidah at Yemen.
- Born: Grote Reber, amateur astronomer and ham radio enthusiast who pioneered radio astronomy in 1938; in Wheaton, Illinois (d. 2002).
- Died: Odilon Lannelongue, 71, French surgeon.

== December 23, 1911 (Saturday) ==
- Russian and Persian troops fought at Tabriz, and Russian reinforcements were deployed from Erivan.
- Born: James Gregory, American character actor on stage, film and TV; in the Bronx, New York City (d. 2002).

== December 24, 1911 (Sunday) ==
- Persia's regent, Nasir al-Mulk, and the cabinet members dissolved Parliament, placing Prime Minister Samsam al-Saltanah in control of the nation until new elections could be held. The voting did not take place until 1914, by which time Iran's government was dependent on approval of Britain and Russia.
- French pilot Armand Gobe set a record by flying 462 miles (744 km) before landing.

== December 25, 1911 (Monday) ==
- Sun Yat-sen arrived in Shanghai, by way of the United States, the United Kingdom and France.
- The play Kismet premiered at the Knickerbocker Theatre in New York City. The controversial drama included a scene of simulated nude bathing, with the actress wearing a skin colored outfit.
- Born: Louise Bourgeois, French-American sculptor; in Paris (d. 2010).

== December 26, 1911 (Tuesday) ==
- Shortly after midnight, the first of 75 men, staying in Berlin's municipal homeless shelter, began dying from poisoning. The evening before, smoked herring had been offered at Christmas dinner, in addition to soup and bread. By the end of the day, 18 were dead. By Sunday, the deaths were traced to a wholesale liquor dealer who had been selling whiskey containing 2/3rds methyl alcohol, commonly used for antifreeze and as a solvent. The case was later referred to as the "Scharmach Catastrophe."
- Cotton textile workers across Mexico walked off the job, shutting down the entire industry. The companies' owners would agree to labor's demands on January 20, with a 10% increase in pay and reduction of work to ten hours a day. The pact "marked a permanent change in labour relations", one historian notes, with workers successfully organizing unions and striking without retaliation.

== December 27, 1911 (Wednesday) ==
- The melody that would become India's National Anthem, Jana Gana Mana, was first performed, on the occasion of a meeting in Calcutta of the Indian National Congress. Composed by Rabindranath Tagore, the song originally had lyrics in the Bengali language. A Hindi-language version was adopted in 1950 as the Republic's anthem.

== December 28, 1911 (Thursday) ==
- The first M1911 pistol, sidearm for the U.S. Army, was manufactured, part of a set of 40 made that day at the Colt firearms factory in Hartford. Serial numbers 1 through 50 were shipped on January 4.
- Born: Gustave Malécot, French mathematician and geneticist; in La Grand-Croix, Loire département (d. 1998).

== December 29, 1911 (Friday) ==
• On December 29, 1911. Bogd Khanate declared its independence. The same day Bogd Khan was declared Khan. Mongolia regained independence after over 153 years

- At Nanjing, Dr. Sun Yat-Sen was elected as the first President of the Republic of China by 16 of the 17 provincial representatives there. He would take office on January 1.
- General Pedro Montero, commander of troops in Guayaquil, was proclaimed as the new President of Ecuador by the Army, a week after the death of President Estrada. A brief civil war ensued, with General Montero being defeated by General Leonidas Plaza, and, on January 25, Montero was executed.
- Born:
  - Klaus Fuchs, German-born nuclear physicist and traitor who secretly passed American nuclear secrets to the Soviets; in Rüsselsheim (d. 1988).
  - Antonio Arcaño, Cuban musician credited with popularizing mambo music; in Havana (d. 1994).
- Died: Rosamund Marriott Watson, 51, British poet, died of cancer.

== December 30, 1911 (Saturday) ==
- Turkey's Grand Vizier and all of his ministers resigned after opposition members of the Chamber of Deputies boycotted the assembly.
- Born: Alfred Friendly, American journalist and managing editor of The Washington Post, credited with bringing the newspaper to national prominence; in Salt Lake City (d. 1983).

== December 31, 1911 (Sunday) ==
- China's National Assembly voted to begin using the "Western calendar" to replace the traditional Chinese lunar calendar used by the Emperor, with full use to begin effective January 1, 1912, which was declared as the "first day of the first month of the first year of the Republic of China" (and was the 13th day of 11th month of the 4609th year of the traditional calendar).
- Russian troops, occupying the Persian city of Tabriz, carried out the execution of Shiite Muslim cleric Seqat-ol-Eslam Tabrizi, along with 12 other Iranian nationalists, in retaliation for their opposition to the Russian invasion.
