= James B. McNamara =

American labor unionist and bomber (1882–1941)

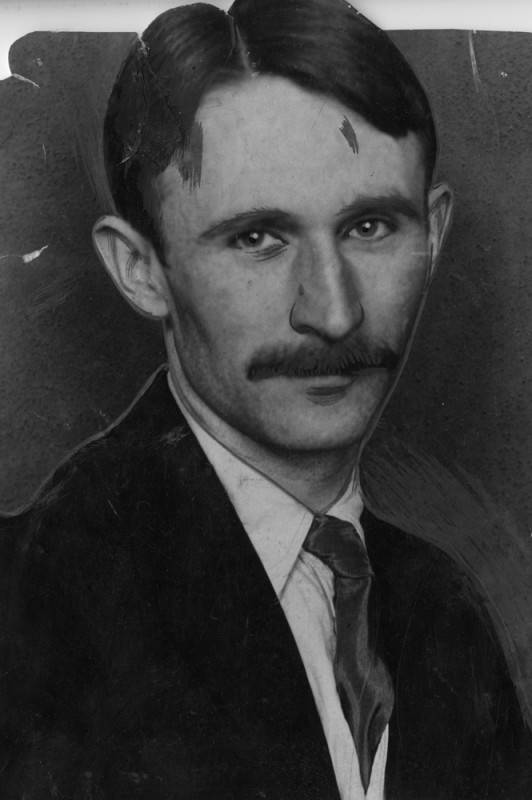
- McNamara c. 1911
- Born: 1882; California, U.S.
- Died: March 8, 1941 (aged 58–59); San Quentin State Prison, San Quentin, California, U.S.
- Known for: Los Angeles Times bombing

James B. McNamara (1882 – March 8, 1941), also known as J.B. McNamara or JB, was a 20th-century American labor unionist, best known for his involvement in the McNamara Case as the bomber of the Los Angeles Times building.

== Background ==
James B. McNamara was born in 1882.

== Career ==
McNamara became a dynamite expert who used time bombs (here, a pipe bomb)

In 1903, steel manufacturers US Steel and its subsidiary the American Steel Company formed the National Erectors' Association (NEA) to promote the open shop and bust unions through a combination of agents provocateurs, private detective agencies, and strikebreakers with support from local, state, and federal law enforcement agencies. In 1905, the International Association of Bridge and Structural Iron Workers union (IW or IABSIW or BSIW) elected as treasurer with his older brother John J. McNamara (AKA J.J. McNamara or JJ).

In 1909, McNamara became an apprentice dynamiter. In 1906, the IW struck at American Bridge in an attempt to retain their contract. However, the open shop campaign was a significant success. By 1910, U.S. Steel had almost succeeded in driving all unions out of its plants. Unions in other iron manufacturing companies also vanished. Only the IW held on (though the strike at American Bridge continued).

=== Bombings ===
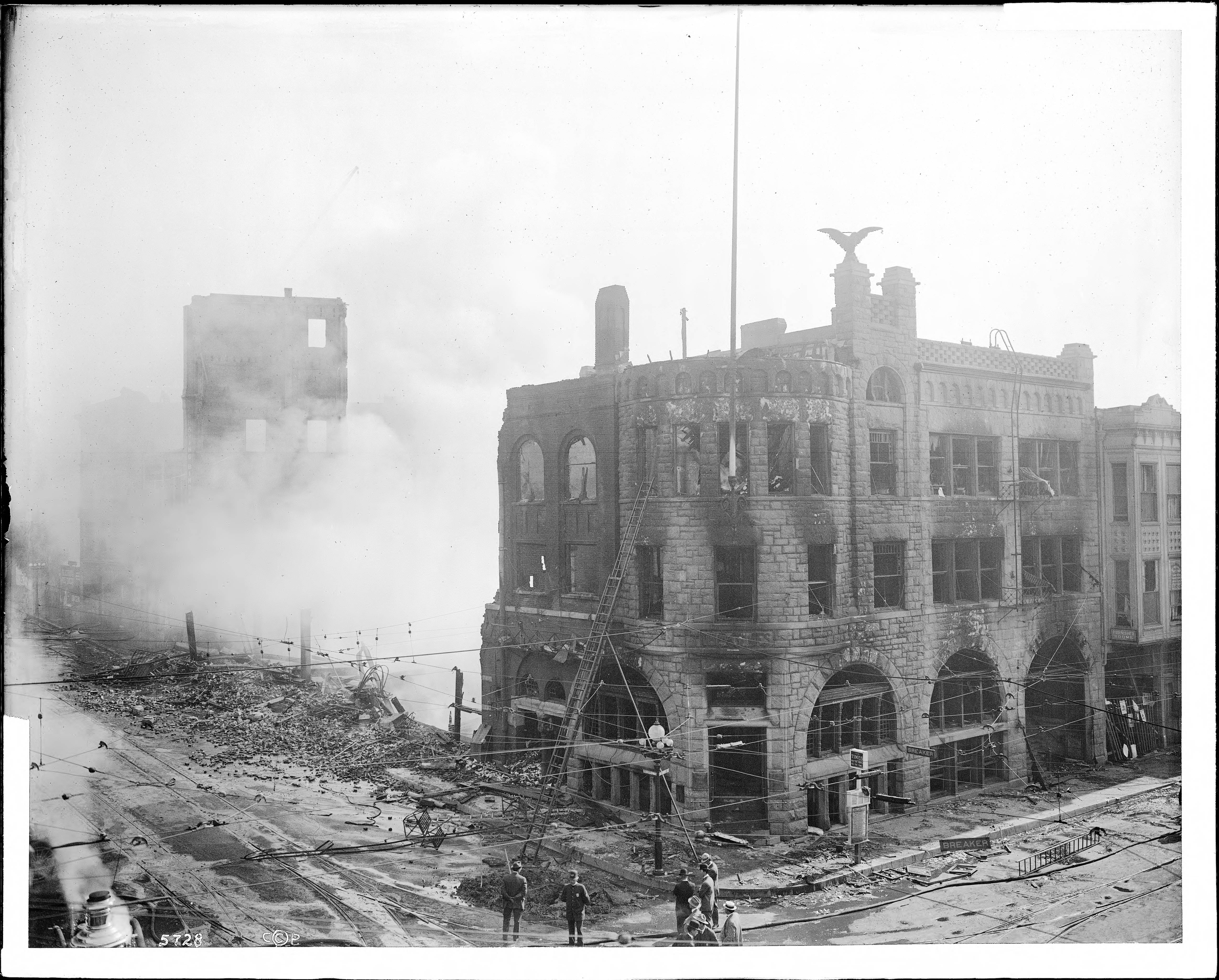
Photo of the bombed Los Angeles Times building (1910)

On October 1, 1910, McNamara set off a bomb that blew up the Los Angeles Times building. The bomb, for which McNamara used a "clock machine" (time bomb), destroyed the building. McNamara fled, first to Salt Lake City, then Chicago.

In December 1910, he helped Ortie McManigal plant a bomb at the Llewellyn iron works on the West Coast. (McManigal later claimed he had been coerced into helping, like a "cornered rat.") McManigal also noted he had dynamited the power plant of an "open shop" in Omaha.

McNamara planted five more bombs in March 1911 alone.

The NEA hired ex-BOI (FBI) agent William J. Burns, owner of the William J. Burns International Detective Agency, to find the bombers. Burns arrested his brother JJ and then McNamara and McManigal. McNamara had learned that Burns was hunting him and spoke to McManigal of bombing his office, but Guy Biddinger of the Burns Detective Agency arrested them both in Toledo, Ohio, on April 12, 1911. At the time of his arrest on April 22, 1911, JJ was speaking to an IW executive board meeting in Indianapolis at the time.

=== Trial ===
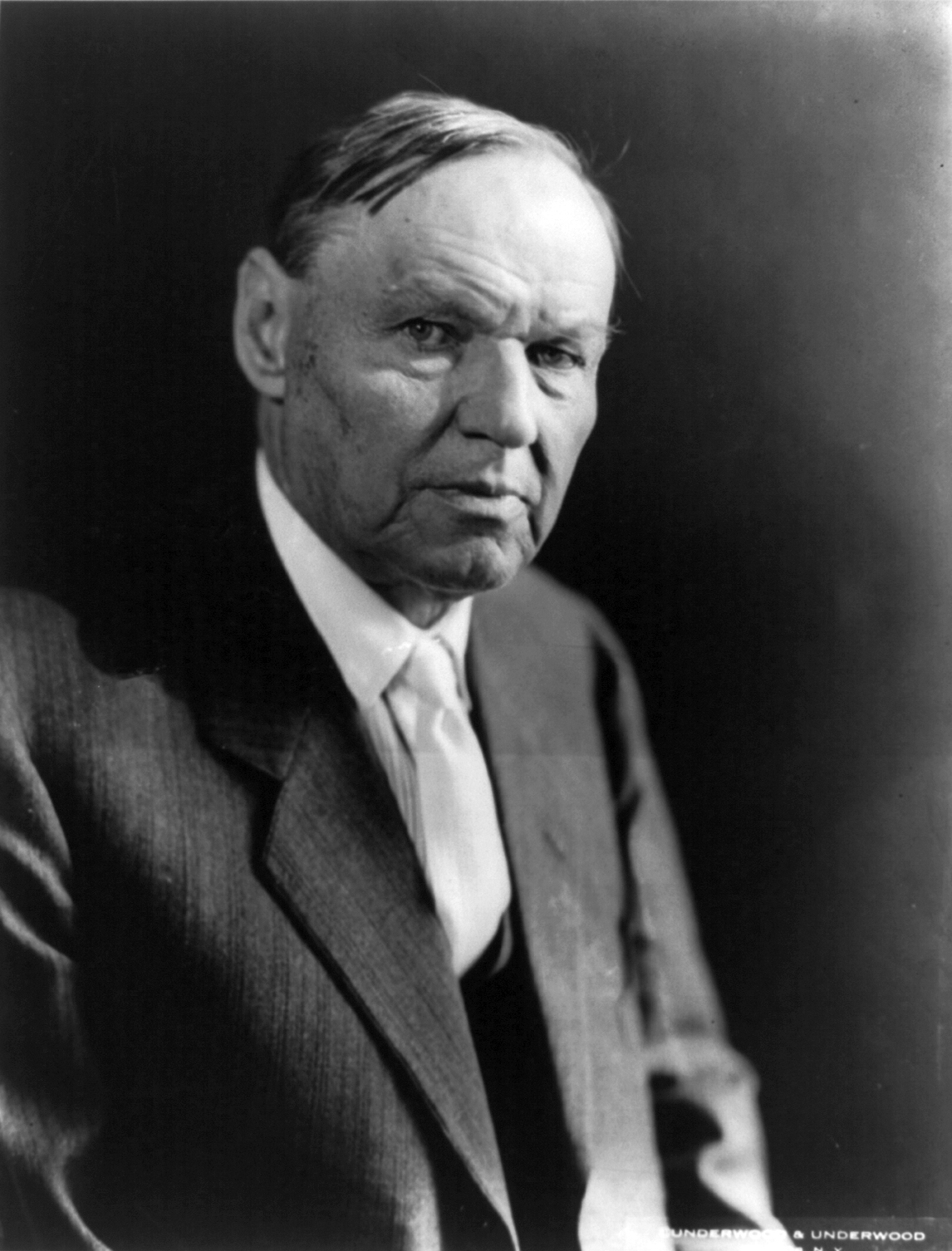
Clarence Darrow (here in 1913) defended James F. McNamara and his brother on behalf of the AFL.

The American Federation of Labor (AKA the A.F. of L. or AFL) organized a defense committee. Clarence Darrow, supported by Joseph Scott and Job Harriman, defended the McNamaras on behalf of the AFL. The AFL claimed that the McNamara brothers were innocent and that Gray Otis, owner of the Los Angeles Times, was responsible for the explosion.

The trial ran in October–November 1911. Burns built a case against the McNamara brothers by extracting a confession from McManigal. McManigal cooperated with prosecutors in exchange for a much-reduced sentence. On December 1, 1911, Darrow had both men plead guilty, for which older brother JJ received a less severe, 15-year sentence, while McNamara received a life in prison sentence.

However, McManigal implicated other IW executives, which led to 38 indictments and greatly undermined the IW.

McNamara served his sentence in the San Quentin Prison.

Communist front organizations campaigned for McNamara's pardon or release or had his support, like the All-California Conference for Defense of Civil Rights and Aid to Labor's Prisoners and the Petition to Grant Pardons to McNamara and Smith.

== Personal life and death ==
McNamara was an (honorary) member of the National Federation for Constitutional Liberties, founded in 1940, whose other members included: Joseph R. Brodsky, Franz Boas, Max Yergan, Tom Mooney, Marc Blitzstein, John M. Coffee, Bella Dodd, Robert W. Dunn, Dashiell Hammett, Abraham J. Isserman, Carol Weiss King, Robert Morss Lovett, Albert Maltz, Vito Marcantonio, Lewis Merrill, Jerry O'Connell, William L. Patterson, Michael Quill, Reid Robinson, George Seldes, Donald Ogden Stewart, Ella Winter, Richard Wright, and Art Young.

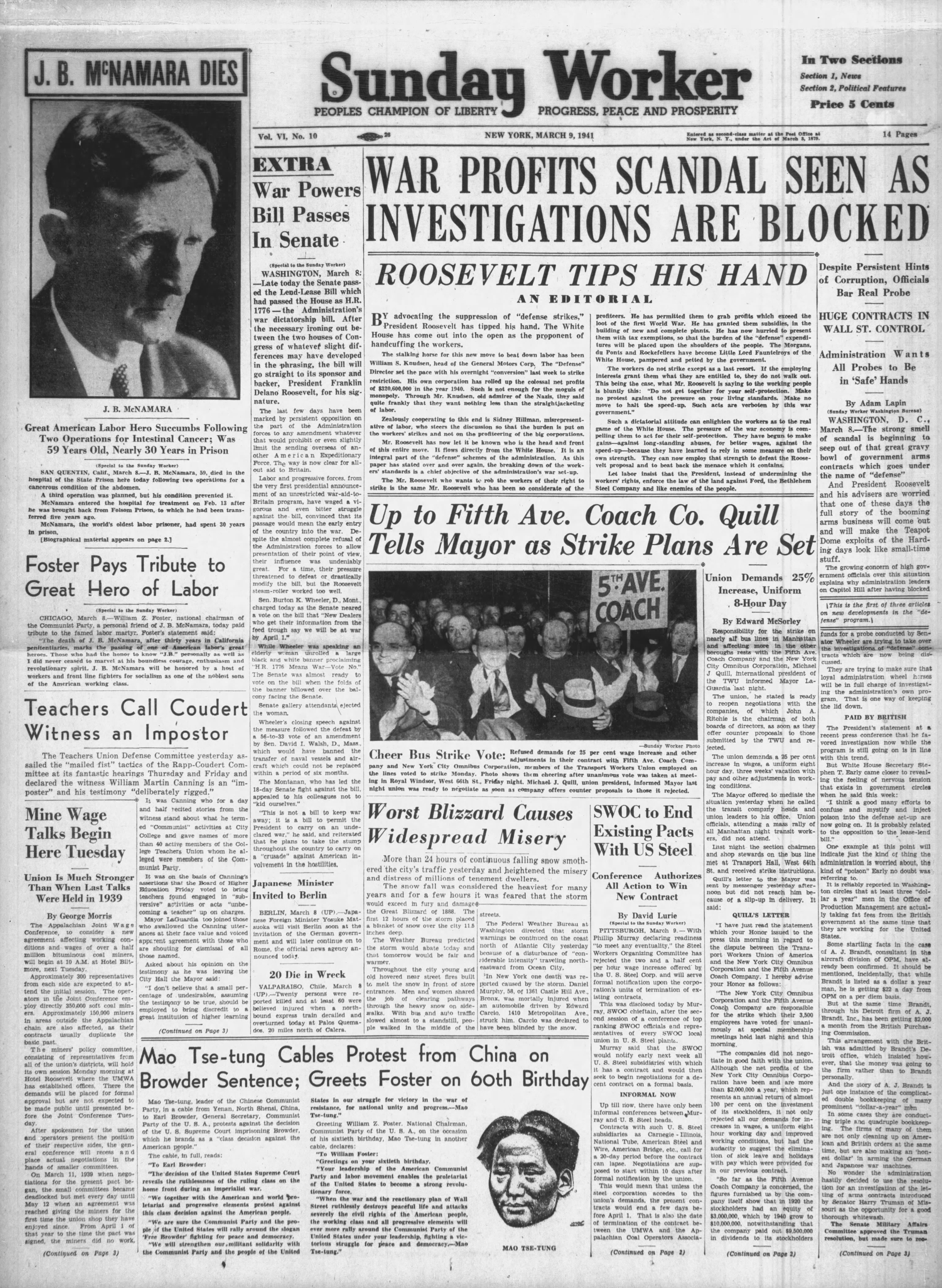
McNamara on the front page of the Daily Worker the day after his death, March 9, 1941

James B. McNamara died in prison on March 8, 1941. He is buried in the Mount Tamalpais Cemetery, San Rafael, California.

== Legacy ==
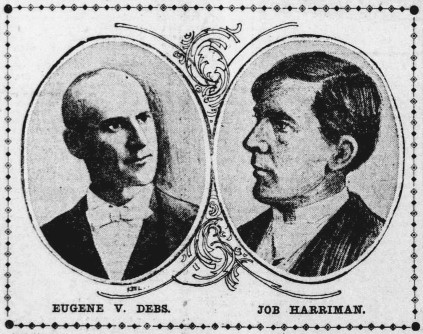
McNamara's guilty pleas undercut the campaign of labor lawyer Job Harriman for mayor of Los Angeles (here, shown as running mate of Eugene V. Debs in 1900)

The guilty plea of the McNamara brothers on December 1, 1911, undercut the campaign of Job Harriman for mayor of Los Angeles, with elections only four days later.

Darrow found himself implicated in jury tampering, an issue never fully resolved.

In 1913, McManigal wrote a 91-page account of the bombings. The cover shows an images of the explosion and McManigal to the side plus a caption "Ortie McManigal's own story of the National Dynamite Plot." Opposite the title page is an image of William J. Burns, captioned "The main who secured the evidence to corroborate my confession."

The McNamara papers at the University of Cincinnati include correspondence with Clarence Darrow and Upton Sinclair and photos.

Robert Cantwell left an unfinished book about McNamara.

== See also ==
- Los Angeles Times bombing
- International Association of Bridge and Structural Iron Workers (IW or IABSIW or BSIW)
- Time bomb
- Timeline of labour issues and events
- History of Los Angeles

== External sources ==
- Inventory of the James B. and John J. McNamara Papers, 1905-1961
- Photo of LATimes bombing on October 1, 1910
- Ortie McManigal - The National Dynamite Plot (1913)
