= Ernst Trömner =

German neurologist

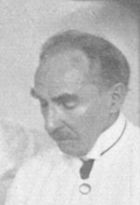
Image of Ernst Trömner

Ernst Trömner (24 August 1868 – 27 May 1930) was a German neurologist who was a native of Meerane in the Kingdom of Saxony.

In 1893 he earned his medical doctorate at Leipzig, and was later director of the neurological department of St. Georg Hospital in Hamburg. He designed the Trömner reflex hammer, a popular reflex hammer that is used for evoking cutaneous and myotatic responses.

His name is also associated with "Trömner's reflex" of which, with the fingers of the patient partially flexed, the tapping of the volar aspect of the tip of the middle or index finger causes flexion of all four fingers and thumb. This phenomenon is associated with pyramidal tract lesions with moderate spasticity.
