= 1911–12 United States cold wave =

Weather event in the United States

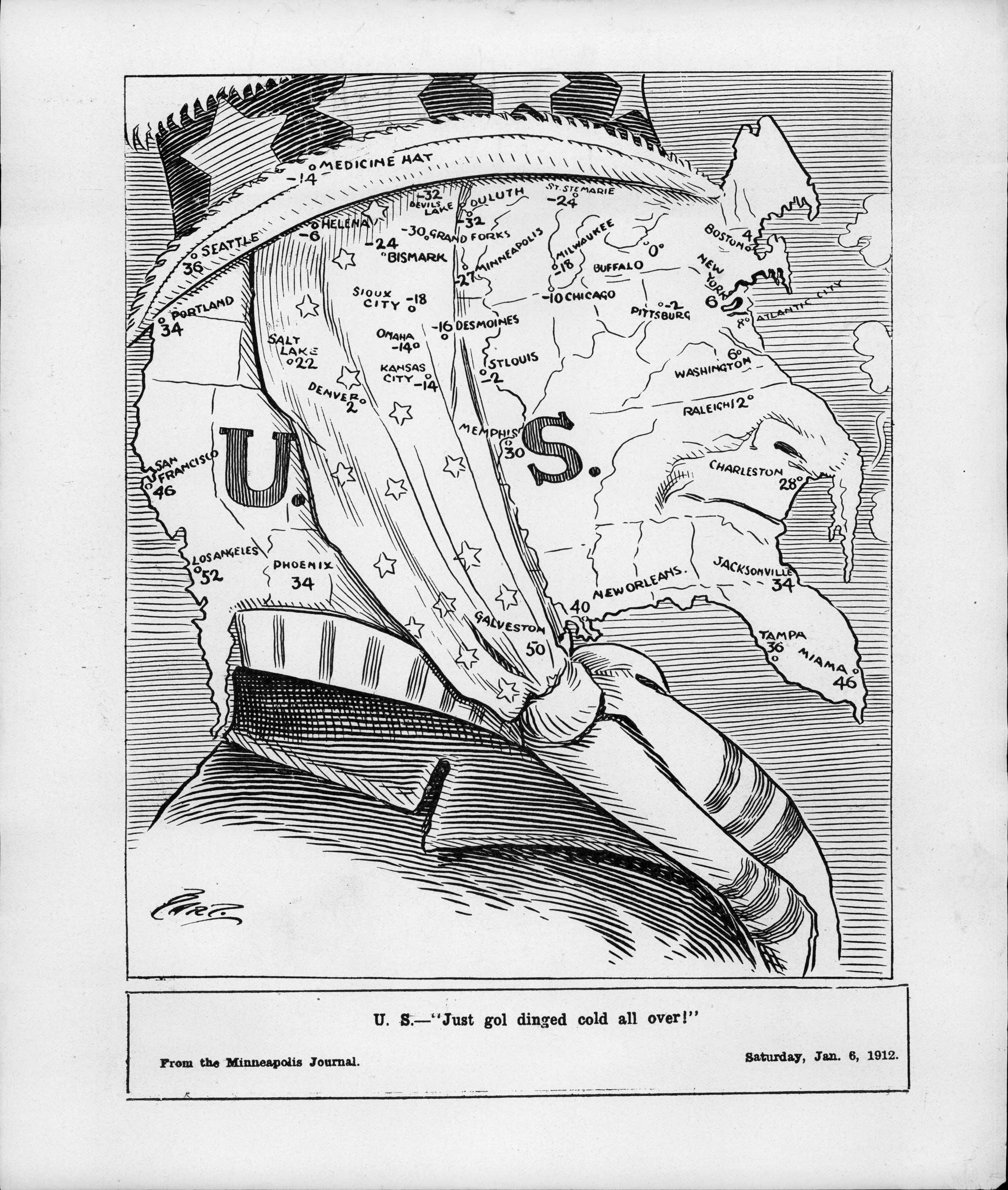
Cartoon by Charles L. Bartholomew

The 1912 United States cold wave was one of the coldest periods since 1870 in the Northern United States, according to the U.S. National Weather Service. The cold wave started in November 1911 and finally ended in March 1912, with periodic interruptions by milder temperatures.

== November 1911–January 1912 ==
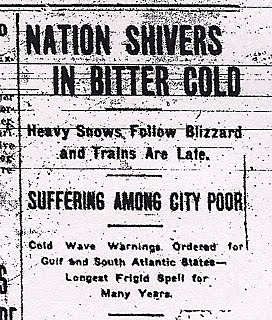
Headline from the January 13, 1912, Ypsilanti Daily Press

The cold wave began in November 1911 when the Great Blue Norther dropped temperatures abruptly. It was the coldest November on record in the contiguous U.S., with an average temperature of 37.27 °F (2.93 °C), while December was relatively mild.

January 1912 was the seventh-coldest January on record in the contiguous U.S. The states of Michigan, Wisconsin, and Minnesota had their coldest Januaries on record. Minneapolis/Saint Paul endured a record-setting 186 consecutive hours of below 0 °F (−17.78 °C) temperatures, from 8 pm on December 31 until 1 pm on January 8. After only four hours above 0 °F (−18 °C), the temperature again dropped below zero, this time for 121 consecutive hours, until 10 am on January 13. Sioux Falls, South Dakota dropped to −38 °F (−38.9 °C) on January 12, which tied the city's third-lowest temperature since records started in 1893.

After originating in the Arctic, this very cold air mass moved south. When it reached the northern U.S., much of the area experienced dangerous wind chills. The cold wave reportedly killed 47 Americans during its first two weeks. The cold was so severe that Niagara Falls froze over completely at one point, forming an ice bridge.

== February–March 1912 ==
February 1912 was less extreme. It was the 24th-coldest February on record for the contiguous U.S.

March 1912 was the second-coldest March on record for the contiguous U.S., with widespread heavy snowfalls. Williston, North Dakota had its coldest March on record from 1895 through 2017.

== 1912 climate ==
In the contiguous U.S., the average daily maximum temperature for 1912 was 61.97 °F (16.65 °C), which is the lowest ever recorded from 1895 through 2025. The year's average daily temperature for the contiguous U.S. was 50.23 °F (10.13 °C), which is the second-lowest ever recorded during those years and slightly warmer than 1917's 50.06 °F (10.03 °C).

== Aftermath ==
The United States Department of Agriculture reported that a freeze in late-December caused $6 million in damages ($200 million today) to the California citrus industry. The department also claimed that its frost warnings prevented an additional $14 million in damages ($467 million today).

These cold waves led to the first use of electric heaters and special sheds to protect against frosts and freezes.
