= Nigel Dennis =

English writer

Nigel Forbes Dennis
- Born: 16 January 1912; Surrey, England
- Died: 19 July 1989 (aged 77); Gloucestershire, United Kingdom
- Education: Odenwaldschule

Nigel Forbes Dennis (16 January 1912 – 19 July 1989) was an English writer, critic, playwright and magazine editor.

== Life ==
Born at his grandfather's house in Surrey, England, Dennis was the son of Lt.-Col. Michael Frederic Beauchamp Dennis, DSO, of the King's Own Scottish Borderers, who came of an old Devonshire family, and Louise, née Bosanquet, whose ancestors were bankers of Huguenot origin. (Louise's cousin, the bowler B.J.T. Bosanquet, invented the "googly", or "Bosie", as it is sometimes known. (Letters to The Times May 1963). The family moved to Southern Rhodesia (now Zimbabwe) and after his father's death in action in 1918, his mother married Fitzroy Spencer Griffin. Dennis attended school in Rhodesia. At fifteen he joined his uncle, Ernan Forbes Dennis (a British diplomat who had worked as vice-consul in Vienna as a cover for his real role as MI6 head of station with responsibility for Austria, Hungary and Yugoslavia), and his wife, the novelist Phyllis Bottome, at their school in Kitzbühel. Dennis's further education was completed at the Odenwaldschule in Germany, a progressive co-educational establishment, after which he returned to England. He remained there for four years until 1934, when he went to the United States to work as a journalist.

Dennis was married twice, first to Marie-Madeleine Massias, from Charente-Maritime, France. They had two daughters, Frederica Freer and Michie Herbert, a sculptor. His second marriage was to the actress Beatrice Ann Hewart Matthew.

He spent his last years mostly in Malta and died in Gloucestershire in July 1989.

== Career ==
Dennis held jobs at the National Board of Review of Motion Pictures, a censorship body; The New Republic, a progressive political journal; and Time. His job at Time returned him to Britain in 1950 (or 1949). Easing into novel writing, in 1949 he published his first acknowledged novel, Boys and Girls Come out to Play (A Sea Change in the US), which won the Anglo-American novel award for that year (shared with Anthony West). It starts semi-autobiographically, with a depiction of a young man having an epileptic seizure, a condition Dennis had all his life. Later in 1955, Dennis published his most notable work, Cards of Identity, a witty psychological satire that gained cult acclaim. The novel was converted into a play the following year. Members of the Identity Club gather at an English country house to listen to papers discussing interesting case histories of various identity problems. The novel details many of the problems England experienced in the late 1940s and early 1950s. His third novel, A House in Order, also deals with the question of identity but it is more personal rather than social as it portrays how a prisoner keeps his mind in order during his imprisonment. Dennis's career involved a mixture of non-fiction, novel, criticism, and play-writing. His book reviews appeared in the Sunday Telegraph for twenty years, starting (with the newspaper itself) in 1961. He became a contributor to Encounter in 1963 and was eventually appointed its co-editor before terminating his relationship with the magazine in 1970.

Dennis's books were few but distinguished. His other works include Two Plays and a Preface (1958) and Dramatic Essays (1962). A short study of Jonathan Swift won the Royal Society of Literature Award under the W. H. Heinemann bequest in 1966; this was followed by Exotics: Poems of the Mediterranean and Middle East (1970) and his last book, An Essay on Malta (1972), with illustrations by Osbert Lancaster.

Three of his plays were put on at the Royal Court theatre: Cards of Identity (1956), The Making of Moo (1957) and August for the People (1961). The first London revival of The Making of Moo was staged at the Orange Tree Theatre, Richmond, London, in November 2009.

According to a letter published in The Guardian in May 2008: "In the 1930s, Dennis wrote Chalk and Cheese; a co-educational school novel under the pseudonym Richard Vaughan. Legend has it that, before publication, every copy was destroyed in an air raid on a warehouse." In fact the novel, which was largely autobiographical, was published in 1934 and reviewed by the Times Literary Supplement, among others.

Susan Sontag called Dennis "one of the writers I most admire in the world".

== Bibliography ==
=== Novel published as by Richard Vaughan ===
- Chalk and Cheese: A Co-educational School Novel (1934)

=== Other novels ===
- Boys and Girls Come Out to Play (1949)
- Cards of Identity (1955)
- A House in Order (1966)

=== Plays ===
- Cards of Identity (1956)
- The Making of Moo (1957)
- August for the People (1961)
- Swansong for Seven Voices (broadcast on BBC Radio 3 in 1985, with music by Stephen Oliver played by John Owen Edwards, piano)

=== Miscellaneous other works ===
- Two Plays and a Preface (1958)
- Jonathan Swift: A Short Character (1964)
- Exotics: Poems of the Mediterranean and Middle East (1970)
- An Essay on Malta (1970)
- Dramatic Essays (1962)
- Exotics: Poems (1971)
