= Reflex hammer =

Medical instrument used by practitioners to test deep tendon reflexes

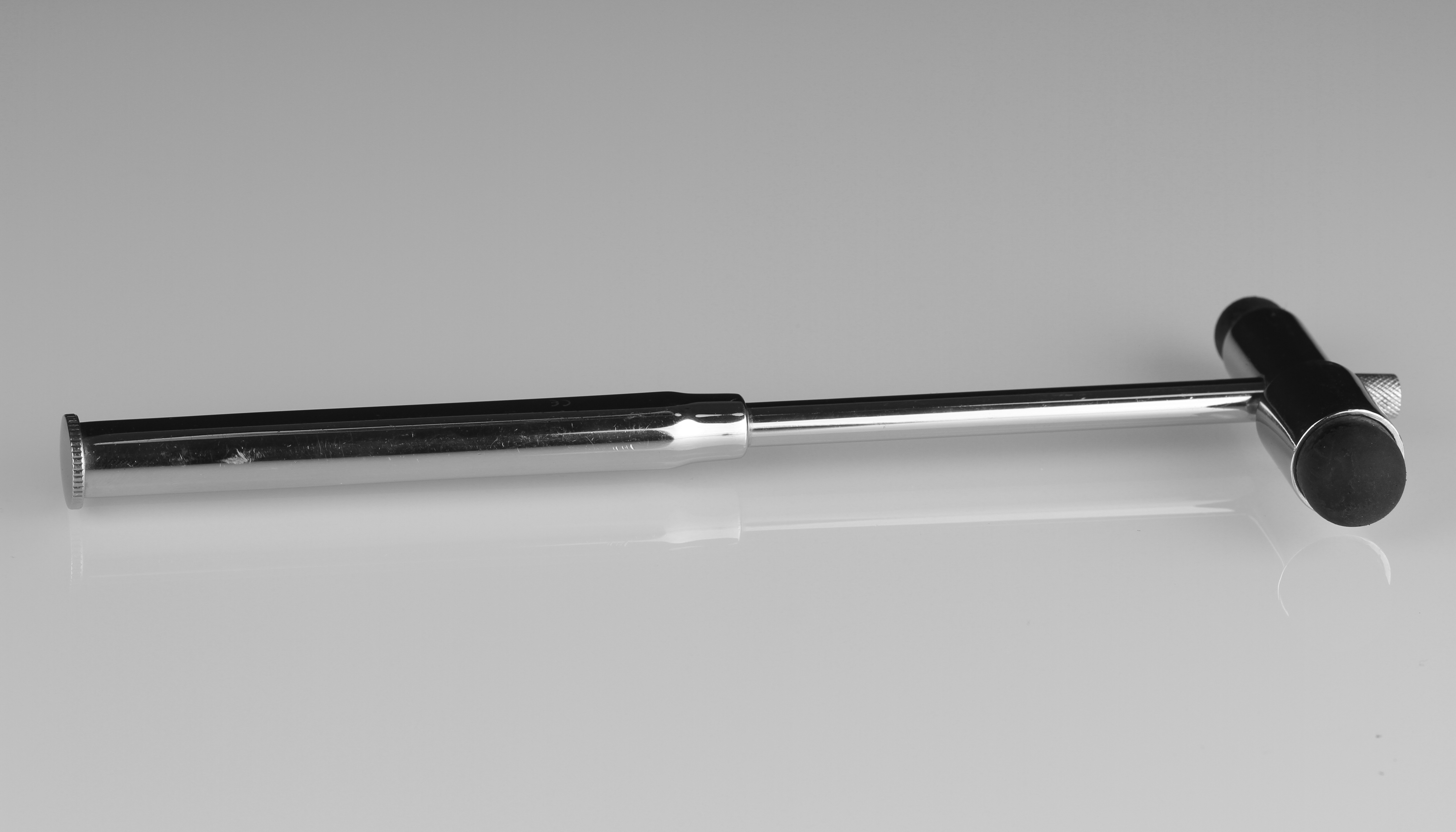
A Buck reflex hammer

A reflex hammer is a medical instrument used by practitioners to test deep tendon reflexes, the best known possibly being the patellar reflex. Testing for reflexes is an important part of the neurological physical examination in order to detect abnormalities in the central or peripheral nervous system.

Reflex hammers can also be used for chest percussion.

== Models of reflex hammer ==
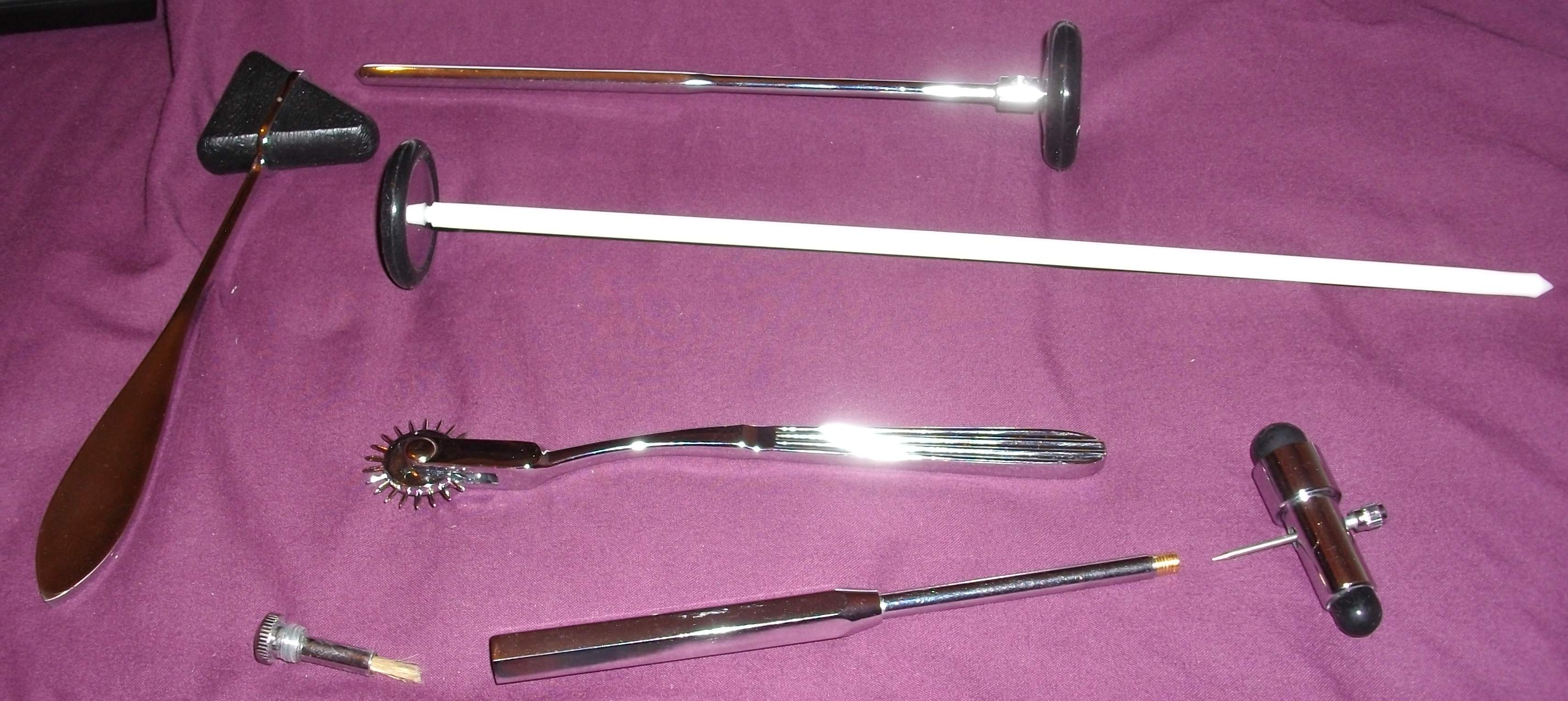
The Taylor hammer appears on the far left. The other tools, from top to bottom, are: Babinski hammer, Queen square hammer, Wartenberg wheel, and Buck hammer (disassembled to show components).

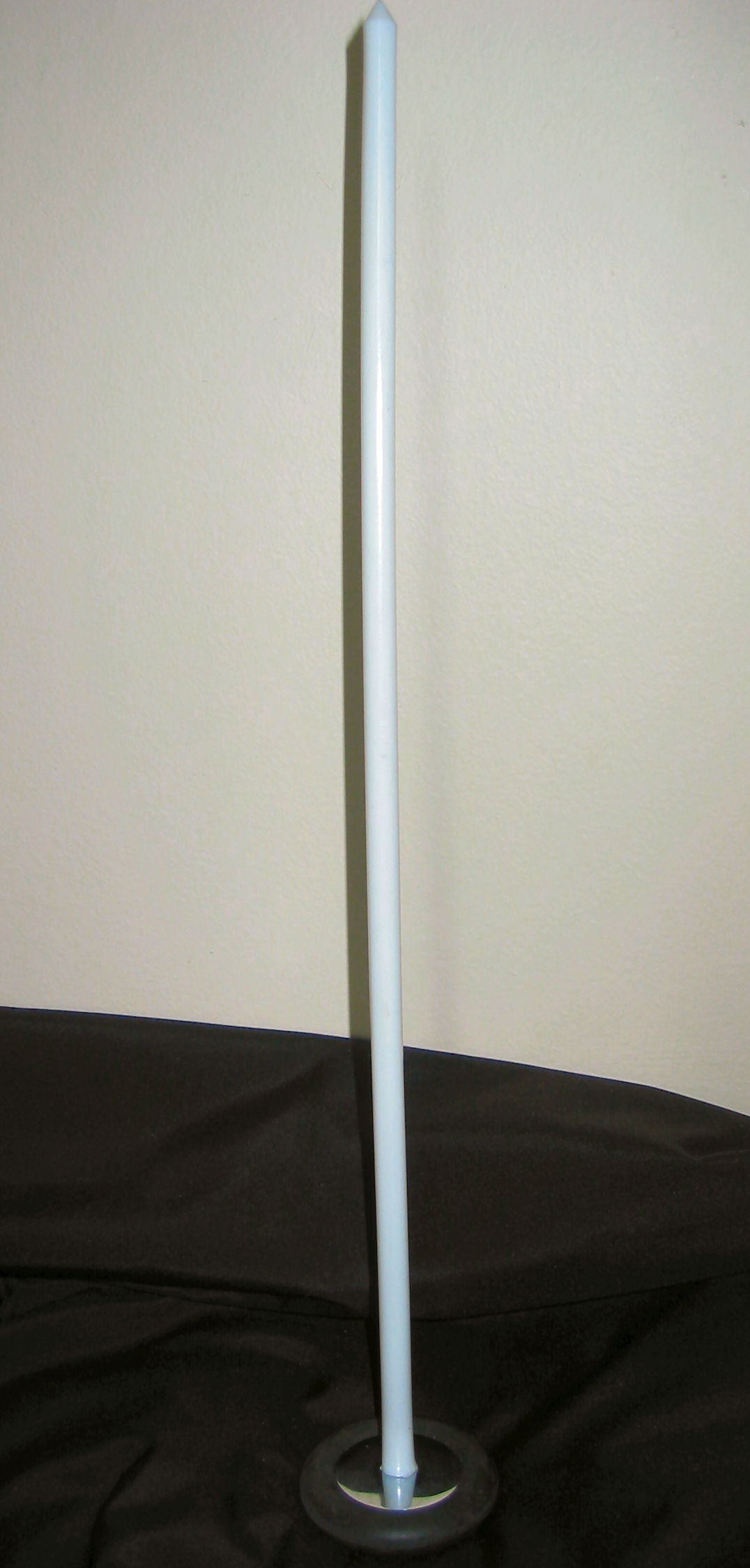
The Queen Square reflex hammer, shown with a plastic handle and a tip that tapers to allow for plantar reflex testing

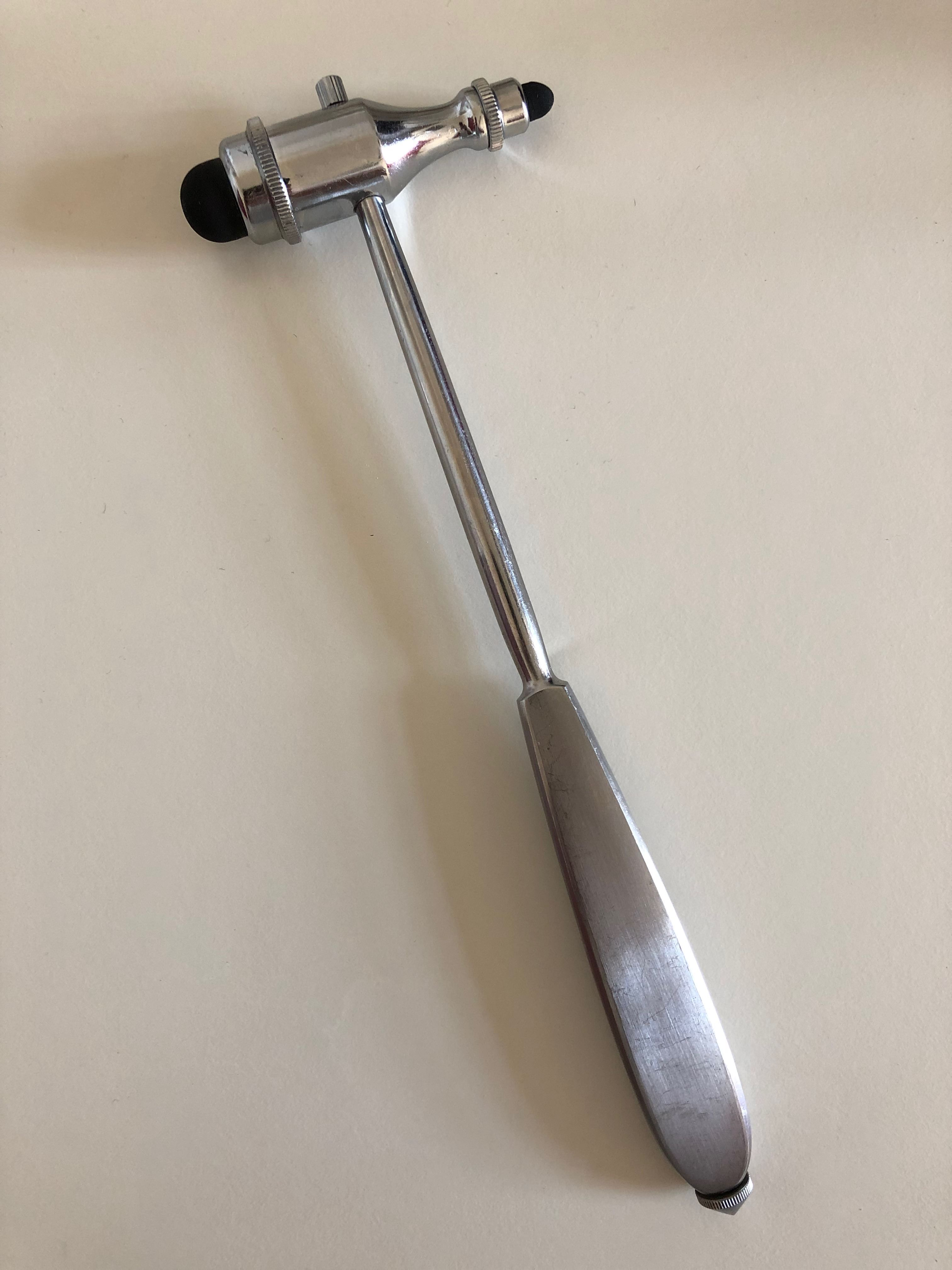
Trömner reflex hammer

Prior to the development of specialized reflex hammers, hammers specific for percussion of the chest were used to elicit reflexes. However, this proved to be cumbersome, as the weight of the chest percussion hammer was insufficient to generate an adequate stimulus for a reflex.

Starting in the late 19th century, several models of specific reflex hammers were created:

- The Taylor or tomahawk reflex hammer was designed by John Madison Taylor in 1888 and is the most well known reflex hammer in the USA. It consists of a triangular rubber component which is attached to a flat metallic handle. The traditional Taylor hammer is significantly lighter in weight when compared to the heavier European hammers.
- The Queen Square reflex hammer was designed for use at the National Hospital for Nervous Diseases (now the National Hospital for Neurology and Neurosurgery) in Queen Square, London. It was originally made with a bamboo or cane handle of varying length, of average 25 to 40 centimetres (10 to 16 inches), attached to a 5-centimetre (2-inch) metal disc with a plastic bumper. The Queen Square hammer is also now made with plastic molds, and often has a sharp tapered end to allow for testing of plantar reflexes though this is no longer recommended due to tightened infection control. It is the reflex hammer of choice of the UK neurologist.
- The Babinski reflex hammer was designed by Joseph Babiński in 1912 and is similar to the Queen Square hammer, except that it has a metallic handle that is often detachable. Babinski hammers can also be telescoping, allowing for compact storage. Babinski's hammer was popularized in clinical use in America by the neurologist Abraham Rabiner, who was given the instrument as a peace offering by Babinski after the two brawled at a black tie affair in Vienna.
- The Trömner reflex hammer was designed by Ernst Trömner. This model is shaped like a two-headed mallet. The larger mallet is used to elicit tendon stretch reflexes, and the smaller mallet is used to elicit percussion myotonia.
- Other reflex hammer types include the Buck, Berliner and Stookey reflex hammers.

There are numerous models available from various commercial sources.

== Method of use ==
The strength of a reflex is used to gauge central and peripheral nervous system disorders, with the former resulting in hyperreflexia, or exaggerated reflexes, and the latter resulting in hyporeflexia or diminished reflexes. However, the strength of the stimulus used to extract the reflex also affects the magnitude of the reflex. Attempts have been made to determine the force required to elicit a reflex, but vary depending on the hammer used, and are difficult to quantify.

The Taylor hammer is usually held at the end by the physician, and the entire device is swung in an arc-like motion onto the tendon in question. The Queen Square and Babinski hammers are usually held perpendicular to the tendon in question, and are passively swung with gravity assistance onto the tendon.

The Jendrassik maneuver, which entails interlocking of flexed fingers to distract a patient and prime the reflex response, can also be used to accentuate reflexes. In cases of hyperreflexia, the physician may place his finger on top of the tendon, and tap the finger with the hammer. Sometimes a reflex hammer may not be necessary to elicit hyperreflexia, with finger tapping over the tendon being sufficient as a stimulus.

== See also ==
- Physical examination
- Neurology
