= The Making of Moo =

Play by Nigel Dennis

The Making of Moo is a play by Nigel Dennis satirizing religion. It was first performed by the English Stage Company at the Royal Court Theatre on 25 June 1957, and starred George Devine, John Osborne, John Moffatt and Joan Plowright. The play was directed by Tony Richardson, the set and costumes were designed by Audrey Cruddas and the music was by Thomas Eastwood. The first London revival of The Making of Moo was staged at the Orange Tree Theatre in November 2009.

== Summary ==
Set in an African state, the play follows Frederick Compton, a British civil engineer, as he builds a much-needed dam that provides water to the local population. However, his actions inadvertently lead to the death of their River God, Ega. Unable to abandon the locals to a godless future, Frederick and his wife, Elizabeth, decide to invent a new god, named Moo, inspired by the cows that wander into their colonial bungalow’s garden.

As time progresses, the worship of Moo grows and transforms into an apocalyptic blood cult. The new religion becomes institutionalized, adopting practices similar to established cults, complete with fundraising efforts and a constructed history. The narrative explores the evolution of Moo's worship, highlighting the surreal and humorous aspects of the incantations and rituals associated with it.

Eventually, the Comptons’ son assumes the role of the prophet, and the story culminates in the notion that religions often require blood sacrifices and thrive on the fervor of their followers. The play concludes with the implications of this new belief system and its impact on the community.

== List of characters ==
(With original cast)

- Ist Native (Anthony Creighton)
- 2nd Native/Mr Fosdick (Robert Stephens)
- 3rd Native/Walter (John Wood)
- Constable (James Villiers)
- Donald Blake (John Osborne)
- Elizabeth Compton (Joan Plowright)
- Fairbrother (John Moffatt)
- Frederick Compton (George Devine)
- Sergeant (Nicholas Brady)
- William (Martin Miller)
- Willis (Stephen Dartnell)
