= Cards of Identity =

1955 novel by Nigel Dennis

- First UK edition
- Author: Nigel Dennis
- Publisher: Weidenfeld & Nicolson
- Publication date: January 1, 1955

Cards Of Identity is a novel by Nigel Dennis, first published in 1955 by Weidenfeld & Nicolson in the UK and Vanguard Press in the US. A satire on psychology, identity theory and class prejudice, the novel is centred on the Identity Club, a group of men who call themselves psychologists and meet once a year to present case histories promoting their chosen theory of identity. The case histories are in fact fictional representations of a character in line with their theoretical biases, rather than analyses of real patients. Surrounding this plot is the story of the local townspeople, who are brainwashed into being servants for the Identity Club. The book culminates with the performance of a pastiche Shakespearian play, The Prince of Antioch.

The novel was highly praised when it first came out. The reviewer for The Times called it "one of the funniest, most intelligent and far-reaching pieces of satire".Hilary Corke, writing in The Listener wrote that "It is the cleverest novel, and the most intellectually formidable, that I have read for many years. It is also one of the funniest." W.H. Auden wrote: "I have read no novel published in the last fifteen years with greater pleasure and admiration."
