= April 1912 =

Month of 1912

<<	April 1912					>>
Su	Mo	Tu	We	Th	Fr	Sa
	1	2	3	4	5	6
7	8	9	10	11	12	13
14	15	16	17	18	19	20
21	22	23	24	25	26	27
28	29	30

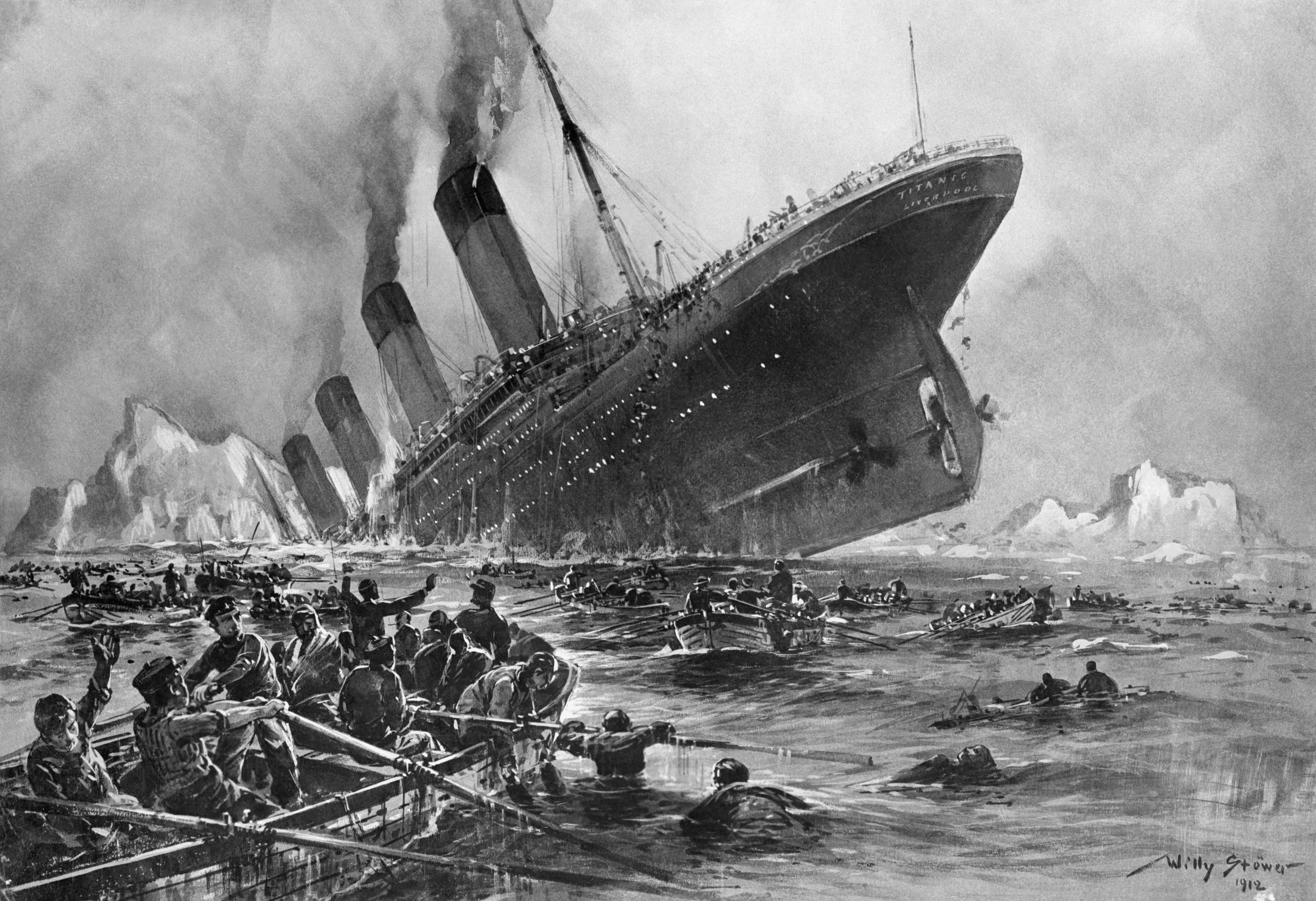
April 14–15, 1912: RMS Titanic sinks, killing 1,496 people

Animation (in minutes) of the Titanic sinking

The following events occurred in April 1912:

== April 1, 1912 (Monday) ==
- The People's Radical Party won the most seats in the Serbian National Assembly in its parliamentary elections.
- The Parliament of Canada passed the Quebec Boundaries Extension Act that expanded the northern border of Quebec to include northern territory primarily inhabited by Inuit and established the province's present size.
- British hopes that Robert Falcon Scott had reached the South Pole before Roald Amundsen of Norway were ended when the Terra Nova arrived in New Zealand without Captain Scott on board, and the news that the Scott team had still been 150 miles from the Pole as of January 3. Amundsen's party had reached the Pole on December 14, 1911. Scott's party had made it to the South Pole on January 17 and died in March on their journey back.
- The Japanese theater Yoshimoto Kogyo was established in Osaka. It later expanded to become an entertainment company in 1932.
- The city of Branson, Missouri, which would become a major American tourist attraction and entertainment center in the 1980s, was chartered.
- Born: Donald Nyrop, American business executive, president and CEO of Northwest Airlines from 1954 to 1976; in Cedar Creek, Nebraska, United States (d. 2010).

== April 2, 1912 (Tuesday) ==
- The number of U.S. Senators increased from 92 to 96 with the swearing in of the legislators from Arizona and New Mexico.
- In the Wisconsin presidential primary, Governor Woodrow Wilson of New Jersey finished ahead of former House Speaker Champ Clark among Democrats, and Senator Robert M. La Follette bested U.S. President William Howard Taft in Republican voting.
- The Titanic began sea trials.
- Eleanor Trehawke Davies became the first woman to cross the English Channel in an airplane, flying as the passenger of Gustav Hamel.
- British pilot Charles Rumney Samson made the first test flight of the new Short biplane in England before it was converted to a floatplane.
- Born: Herbert Mills, a tenor in the four-man "Mills Brothers" band; in Piqua, Ohio, United States (d. 1989).
- Died: Ishimoto Shinroku, 59, Japanese army officer and Minister of War for the Empire of Japan from 1911 to 1912 (b. 1854).

== April 3, 1912 (Wednesday) ==
- Calbraith Perry Rodgers, the 33-year-old American aviator who had flown, with multiple stops, from the Atlantic coast to the Pacific Coast in the autumn of 1911, was killed while flying his Wright airplane in an airshow. One author would later write that "the first person to fly across the continental US was also the first to die as a result of a bird strike. Rodgers' Wright Pusher airplane collided with a seagull, the engine failed, and he crashed into the ocean near Long Beach, California."

== April 4, 1912 (Thursday) ==
- The Titanic arrived at the White Star Line pier in Southampton, England and was checked in at 1:15 am.
- Classes began at Aurora College in Aurora, Illinois, after the students and faculty of Mendota College relocated in mid-semester from Mendota, Illinois, 50 miles to the west.
- Died:
  - Isaac K. Funk, 72, American publisher and co-founder (with Adam Willis Wagnalls) of the Funk & Wagnalls Company. Prior to his death, Wagnalls had made arrangements with Dr. James H. Hyslop, editor of the Journal of the American Society for Psychical Research, to establish communication from the afterlife with a living person.
  - Charles B. Aycock, Governor of North Carolina 1901 to 1905, known for advancing education and the opening of schools in that state, died while making a speech in Birmingham, Alabama, to the Alabama Education Association and 5,000 teachers. According to a reporter at the scene, Aycock said, "I have fought long the battles of education," and added, after asking a question of Alabama's Governor Emmet O'Neal, "However, I have determined, if such a thing is possible, to open the doors of the schools to every child..." He stopped, staggered and fell dead of a heart attack.

== April 5, 1912 (Friday) ==
- After more than 200 members of the Industrial Workers of the World had been put in the city's jail, the police chief in San Diego had the prisoners released into the hands of vigilantes. The mob escorted the "Wobblies" to the county line, beat them, and warned them never to return. An investigator sent by Governor Hiram Johnson described the city's police as so brutal that he thought he was "sojourning in Russia."
- Born:
  - John Le Mesurier, English actor, best known for his role as Sergeant Wilson in the BBC sitcom Dad's Army; in Bedford, England (d. 1983).
  - István Örkény, Hungarian writer, known for works including his short story collection One Minute Stories; in Budapest, Austria-Hungary (now Hungary) (d. 1979).

== April 6, 1912 (Saturday) ==
- The first conference to unify all labor organizations in New Zealand was held in Wellington. Resulting conferences eventually lead to establishing the New Zealand Labour Party in 1916.
- The Miners' Federation of Great Britain ordered its striking members to return to work after passage of the Minimum Wage Bill.
- The First Symphony of Franco Alfano premiered, at the Casino Municipal at Sanremo, Italy.
- Died: Giovanni Pascoli, 56, Italian poet, member of the Decadent movement in Italy (b. 1855).

== April 7, 1912 (Sunday) ==
- The secret ballot was used for the first time in the legislative election in Argentina, two months after the "Sáenz Peña Law" was put into effect at the recommendation of President Roque Sáenz Peña. Half of the 120 seats in the Chamber of Deputies were subject to the voting.
- French cyclist Charles Crupelandt won the 17th Paris–Roubaix race, completing the 266 km (165 mi) course with a time of 8 hours and 30 minutes.
- Born:
  - Harry Hay, English-born American activist, founder of the gay rights groups Mattachine Society and Radical Faeries; in Worthing, West Sussex, England (d. 2002).
  - Jack Lawrence, American composer, known for song hits including "Beyond the Sea" and "All or Nothing at All"; in New York City, United States (d. 2009).

== April 8, 1912 (Monday) ==
- The British coal miners' strike ended with the return of thousands of workers to the coal pits in England, Scotland and Wales. The approval of a guaranteed minimum wage ended the three-week-old strike, which had halted not only the production of coal, but the output from factories dependent on coal as a fuel.
- England won the third Five Nations rugby championship.
- Spanish cyclist José Magdalena won the second Tour of Catalonia in Barcelona, completing the three-day, 427 km (265 mi) race course with a combined time of 18 hours, 32 minutes and 8 seconds.
- Born:
  - Sonja Henie, Norwegian figure skater, gold medalist at the 1928, 1932, and 1936 Winter Olympics; in Kristiana (now Oslo), Norway (d. 1969).
  - Alois Brunner, Austrian-German SS officer, assistant to Adolf Eichmann and commander of the Drancy internment camp during World War II; in Rohrbrunn, Austria-Hungary (now Austria) (d. 2001 or 2010).
  - Mary Dee, American broadcaster, first African-American woman to become an on-air radio broadcaster in the United States; in Homestead, Pennsylvania, United States (d. 1964).
- Died: Andrew Saks, 65, American entrepreneur, founder of Saks & Company, now Saks Fifth Avenue (b. 1847).

== April 9, 1912 (Tuesday) ==
- U.S. President William Howard Taft signed legislation creating the United States Children's Bureau as an agency within the United States Department of Commerce and Labor.
- In the Illinois primaries, former U.S. President Theodore Roosevelt beat incumbent U.S. President William Howard Taft, while Champ Clark finished well ahead of New Jersey Governor Woodrow Wilson.
- Boston's Fenway Park opened with the Boston Red Sox beating Harvard University 2–0 in an exhibition game.

== April 10, 1912 (Wednesday) ==
- The Titanic, the largest ship ever constructed up to that time, began its maiden voyage from Southampton, England at noon, with a final destination of New York City. On its exit, the ship caused the American liner SS New York to break free of its moorings. It arrived in Cherbourg, France that evening at 7:00 pm where it took on more passengers before departing two hours later.
- The French liner SS Niagara, sailing from Le Havre, France to New York City, struck ice while sailing near Newfoundland. The bow plates were dented, the ship began to leak, and an S.O.S. was sent. The steamer Carmania rushed to the rescue, but the crew of the Niagara was able to make repairs.
- Born: Boris Kidrič, Slovene state leader and first Prime Minister of Slovenia; in Vienna, Austria-Hungary (now Austria) (d. 1953).

== April 11, 1912 (Thursday) ==
- British Prime Minister H. H. Asquith introduced the Third Home Rule Bill in the House of Commons of the United Kingdom.
- The Titanic arrived at Queenstown (now Cobh), Ireland at 12:30 pm, and picked up the last of her passengers. She then departed for New York City with 2,208 people on board.
- ʻAbdu'l-Bahá, leader of the Baháʼí Faith, arrived in New York City to continue his journey to spread the new religion to the Western world. The spiritual leader had been brought over by the steamer S.S. Cedric, which had left Naples on March 24, 1912. The religious leader would spend the rest of the year in the U.S., giving 200 speeches on "The Oneness of Religion," and visiting 32 cities.
- Crosley Field, which would be the home of baseball's Cincinnati Reds for the next 58 seasons, opened to a record crowd of 26,336 people. The Reds beat the Chicago Cubs 10–6 in the opener, and would beat the San Francisco Giants 5–4 in their final game in the stadium on June 24, 1970, before moving to Riverfront Park.
- In a minor league American Association baseball game between the Kansas City Blues and the Columbus Senators, there were no home runs nor foul balls hit into the stands. Only one baseball was used for the entire nine innings, a feat that has never happened since in American professional baseball.
- The musical A Winsome Widow by Raymond Hubbell opened at the Olympia Theatre in New York City and ran for a total 172 performances. One of its feature songs "Be My Little Baby Bumble Bee" was recorded as a single in July of 1912 by singers Ada Jones and Billy Murray through Victor Records.
- Died:
  - Ernest Duchesne, 37, French physician who discovered the antibiotic properties of mold against bacteria, 32 years before the same discovery by Alexander Fleming led to the development of penicillin, died of tuberculosis (b. 1874).
  - Frederick Dent Grant, 61, American army officer, eldest son of U.S. President Ulysses S. Grant, commander of the New York Volunteers during the Spanish–American War and Department of the East during the Philippine–American War (b. 1850).

== April 12, 1912 (Friday) ==
- The famous combination of shortstop Joe Tinker, second baseman Johnny Evers and first baseman Frank Chance appeared together in a baseball game for the last time, as their Chicago Cubs team lost at Cincinnati, 3–2. The next day, Chance, now manager of the Chicago Cubs, replaced himself at first base with Vic Saier. The trio had begun working together on September 13, 1902, and was memorialized in the poem "Baseball's Sad Lexicon."
- Italian composer Ferruccio Busoni premiered his "comic fantasy" German-language opera The Bridal Choice at the Stadttheater in Hamburg.
- Born:
  - Georges Franju, French film director, known for films including Head Against the Wall, Eyes Without a Face, and Judex; in Fougères, France (d. 1987).
  - Gerald Goldberg, Irish politician, first Jewish Lord Mayor of Cork; in Cork, United Kingdom of Great Britain and Ireland (now Ireland) (d. 2003).
  - Walt Gorney, Austrian-born American actor, best known as "Crazy Ralph" in the Friday the 13th horror series; in Vienna, Austria-Hungary (now Austria) (d. 2004).
  - Hamengkubuwono, Indonesian noble and politician, second Vice President of Indonesia; in Yogyakarta, Dutch East Indies (now Indonesia) (d. 1988).
- Died: Clara Barton, 90, American nurse who founded the American Red Cross (b. 1821).

== April 13, 1912 (Saturday) ==
- The Royal Flying Corps, a predecessor to the British Royal Air Force, was established as a separate branch of the armed forces by warrant signed by King George.
- An intruder going by the name of Michael Winter successfully forced his way into the White House. He was caught and ejected by the House's doorman before reattempting and was caught again by White House police officers. Winter insisted he had to meet with the U.S. president and had a knife on him when searched. Winter was eventually incarnated at a mental institution for psychiatric evaluation.
- Australian adventurer Francis Birtles became the first person to cross the 1,100 kilometres (684 mi) long Nullarbor Plain by car in Australia.
- Both England and Scotland association football teams ended the British Home Championship tied at five points each.
- Died: Takuboku Ishikawa, 26, Japanese poet, member of the Myōjō group in Japan; in Iwate Prefecture (b. 1886).

== April 14, 1912 (Sunday) ==
- At 11:40 pm ship time, RMS Titanic struck an iceberg in the North Atlantic Ocean. Seconds earlier, lookout Frederick Fleet spotted the iceberg straight ahead, but the ship was running at 22 knots (41 km/h; 25 mph) and tore the side after attempting to steer around. The collision occurred roughly 400 miles (640 km) east of Newfoundland. The ship would stay afloat for two hours and forty minutes. The ship closest to the Titanic, SS Californian, was only a few miles away, and had transmitted warnings about the ice field, but its radio operator had turned off his equipment at 11:30 pm, ten minutes before the collision. Throughout their voyage, Titanic had received warnings from the La Touraine, the Caronia, the Noordam, the Baltic, the Amerika, the Californian, and the Mesaba.
- China's President Yuan Shikai issued a manifesto asking the five separate race groups in the nation to unite through intermarriage.
- Paul Émile Chabas publicly unveiled his painting September Morn at the Paris Salon exhibition and sold it for 50,000 francs ($10,000). Although the oil painting famously depicted a nude model wading in a lake, controversy around the painting only occurred the following year when reprints of the painting were distributed in the United States.
- Association football club Santos, winner of 8 national championships in Brazil's major soccer football league, was founded in Santos, Brazil. It would play its first game on June 23.
- The silent film Paul J. Rainey's African Hunt was released by Carl Laemmle, who would found Universal Pictures two years later. The film was a national hit and would gross $500,000 in revenues.
- Born:
  - Joie Chitwood, American race car driver and businessman, in Denison, Texas, United States (d. 1988).
  - Robert Doisneau, French photographer, credited as one of the pioneers of photojournalism; in Gentilly, Val-de-Marne, France (d. 1994).
- Died: Henri Brisson, 77, French state leader, Prime Minister of France 1885 to 1886 (b. 1835).

== April 15, 1912 (Monday) ==
- The Titanic sank at 2:20 am ship time. The conclusion of the investigative report by the British Board of Trade found that only 710 of the people on board had survived and 1,514 had died. Most of the survivors (338) were adult men, followed by 316 women and 56 children. Evacuation of the ship had been ordered at 12:05 am. The first lifeboat had been lowered before 12:45 am and the last lifeboat was lowered at 2:05 am. Years later, a Titanic historian, Phil Gowan was able to pinpoint the number of people aboard at the time of impact and the number of those who died. Titanic was carrying 2,208 aboard and about 1,496 died, leaving 712 survivors. The RMS Carpathia arrived at 4:10 am to rescue the survivors who had been able to reach a lifeboat.
  - See Passengers of the Titanic and Crew of the Titanic for victims and survivors.
- A rail line of 11 miles 70 chains (19.1 kilometres) in length was opened between Buhrmannsdrif to Ottoshoop, in Transvaal, South Africa.
- The Daily Herald began publication as a syndicalist newspaper. It was published until 1964, when it was relaunched as The Sun tabloid.
- Born: Kim Il Sung, absolute ruler of North Korea as Chairman of the Workers' Party from 1949 until his death in 1994; premier from 1948 to 1972 and President from 1972 to 1994; as Kim Song Ju, in Mangyongdae, Japanese Korea (now Man'gyŏngdae-guyŏk, Pyongyang, North Korea) (d. 1994). In 1998, four years after his death, the constitution of North Korea would be amended to declare Kim the "Eternal President."

== April 16, 1912 (Tuesday) ==
- Harriet Quimby became the first woman to pilot an aircraft across the English Channel, less than three years after Louis Bleriot had become the first man to make the crossing. Quimby departed Dover at 5:30 am in a fog and landed at Neufchâtel-Hardelot, 25 miles (40 km) south of her intended destination of Calais, France. Her accomplishment was overshadowed by the news of the sinking of Titanic. She would be killed in a plane crash less than three months later.
- Luther E. Hall was elected Governor of Louisiana.
- Born:
  - John Halas, Hungarian-British animator, known for his collaborations with wife Joy Batchelor on Animal Farm, as János Halász; in Budapest, Austria-Hungary (now Hungary) (d. 1995).
  - Edmond Jabès, Egyptian-born French writer, author of The Book of Questions and The Book of Resemblances; in Cairo, Egypt (d. 1991).
  - David Langton, Scottish actor, best known for the role of Richard Bellamy in the BBC drama series Upstairs, Downstairs; in Motherwell, North Lanarkshire, Scotland (d. 1994).
  - Catherine Scorsese, American actress, mother of film director Martin Scorsese, known for roles in Who's That Knocking at My Door and Goodfellas; in New York City, United States (d. 1997).
  - Garth Williams, American book illustrator, best known for his illustrations for the children's literature including Stuart Little, Charlotte's Web, and the Little House series; in New York City, United States (d. 1996).

== April 17, 1912 (Wednesday) ==
- Russian soldiers killed 270 striking gold miners and wounded 270 others after firing into a crowd as they protested. The miners had gone on strike in Siberia to demand a reduction in the workday and improved food and sanitation. The dead were buried in a mass grave. On the old Russian (Julian) calendar, the date was April 4, which is sometimes mistakenly cited as the date of the massacre.
- During a solar eclipse, Victor Francis Hess ascended in a balloon to measure changes in radiation.
- Julia Lathrop became the first woman to lead a U.S. federal government agency, after being appointed by U.S. President William Howard Taft to direct the United States Children's Bureau.
- Rebels in Mexico captured the capitals of the states of Sinaloa and Coahuila.
- The Fez riots broke out in protest against the French imposition of the protectorate regime in Morocco. They erupted in Fez, then the Moroccan capital.
- A memorial to American naval commander John Paul Jones was unveiled as the first sculpture in West Potomac Park, Washington, D.C.
- Born:
  - Marta Eggerth, Hungarian-American opera singer, known for her collaborations with Metropolitan Opera, in Budapest, Austria-Hungary (now Hungary) (d. 2013).
  - Jo Ann Robinson, American activist, leader of the Women's Political Council that initiated the boycott of buses in Montgomery, Alabama; in Culloden, Georgia, United States (d. 1992).

== April 18, 1912 (Thursday) ==
- The Carpathia arrived in New York City with survivors from the Titanic.
- Italy attacked Ottoman Turkey directly, as 27 warships sailed into the Dardanelles and began bombardment of Fort Kilid-ul-Bahr and Fort Sedd-ul-Bahr for two and a half hours. A Turkish gunboat was sunk after its crew escaped, and one of the yachts of the Ottoman Sultan was captured by Italian forces. There were 300 Turkish soldiers killed and more wounded in the destruction of the Kunkaleh Fort.
- Muslim soldiers in Fez, Morocco mutinied, killing fifty French officers and soldiers and almost 100 Jewish residents, before being suppressed.
- Coal miners in Kanawha County, West Virginia went on strike against the mine operators. The strike became increasingly violent over time, resulting in 50 deaths by the time it ended in July 1913.
- Died:
  - Frederick Seddon, 41, was hanged at Pentonville Prison, England for the poisoning and murder of Eliza Barrow in 1911 (b. 1872).
  - Walter Clopton Wingfield, 78, British army officer and pioneer in the development of lawn tennis (b. 1833).

== April 19, 1912 (Friday) ==
- The Russian Empire agreed to recognize Italian sovereignty over Libya in return for Italy's support of Russian influence in the Balkans.
- At a United States Senate committee into the sinking of the Titanic begins under chairman William Alden Smith of Michigan. Several surviving crewmembers of the Titanic are held back in the United States to take part in the investigation which spans over two weeks.
- The United States Hydrographic Office and representatives of the steamship lines agreed that the winter time course of ships would be 270 miles south of the course taken by the Titanic, adding between 9 and 14 hours to the trip. The new route would be 3,080 miles rather than 2,858 miles.
- An Italian blimp took the first known film footage of enemy positions, capturing Ottoman Army positions in Libya during the Italo-Turkish War.
- The Sidi M'Cid Bridge opened in Constantine, Algeria. Suspended 175 m over the Rhummel River, it was the world's highest suspended bridge until 1929.
- Born: Glenn T. Seaborg, American chemist, recipient of the Nobel Prize in Chemistry for discovering 10 transuranium elements; in Ishpeming, Michigan, United States (d. 1999).
- Died: Patricio Escobar, 69, President of Paraguay 1886 to 1890 (b. 1843).

== April 20, 1912 (Saturday) ==
- The luxury ocean liner SS France began its maiden voyage, from Le Havre, France ten days after the Titanic had started its trip. The ship would remain in service until 1935. Carrying 1,273 passengers (with room for 2,026 and enough lifeboats for all), the France arrived safely in New York City six days later.
- The sudden death from an apparent heart attack of Oaxacan Governor Benito Juárez Maza triggered six months of battles between Mexico's national government and Juárez Maza's followers, who believed he had been poisoned.
- Boston's Fenway Park and Detroit's Tiger Stadium (at that time known as Navin Field) both officially opened on the same day. At Fenway, the Boston Red Sox beat the New York Highlanders (now the New York Yankees) 7–6. The same afternoon, the Detroit Tigers beat the Cleveland Indians 6–5. Fenway Park is still used by the Red Sox, making it the oldest active ballpark in the MLB, and was added to the National Register of Historic Places on March 7, 2012. Tiger Stadium would be the Tigers' home for 87 seasons and was replaced by Comerica Park on April 11, 2000. It was the only other occasion when two major league stadiums would open on the same day (the San Francisco Giants' Pacific Bell Park being the other field).
- The all-boys Baranagore Ramakrishna Mission Ashrama High School was founded at Baranagar, Calcutta.
- Marcel Duchamp publicly unveiled his Nude Descending a Staircase, No. 2 at a Cubist exhibit at the Galeries Dalmau in Barcelona. It would be displayed the following year at the Armory Show in New York City.
- Died: Bram Stoker, 64, Irish writer who created the character of Dracula (b. 1847).

== April 21, 1912 (Sunday) ==
- At Munich, Walter Friedrich and Paul Knipping confirmed the theory, made by German physicist Max von Laue, that the x-rays aimed at a crystal would be diffracted, and that the patterns left on a photographic plate would effectively show the location of individual atoms. Friedrich and Knippe aimed x-rays at a crystal of copper sulfate, and produced photographs, later misplaced, of the structure of the crystal. Von Laue would be awarded the Nobel Prize in Physics in 1914.
- Aleister Crowley was appointed by Ordo Templi Orientis leader Theodor Reuss as the "National Grand Master General for Great Britain and Ireland" to spread the Reuss's variety of the occult in the British Isles. Crowley would later be designated by Reuss as "Supreme and Holy King of Ireland, Iona and all the Britons within the sanctuary of the Gnosis."
- László Lukács formed a new cabinet as Prime Minister of Hungary.
- The New York Highlanders (later the New York Yankees) and the New York Giants played an exhibition baseball game at the Polo Grounds to raise money for destitute survivors of the Titanic. The Giants won, 11–2, before a crowd of 14,083 and the game raised $9,425.25.
- The Albanian national anthem Himni i Flamurit, written by Aleksandër Stavre Drenova with the music adapted by a composition from Romanian composer Ciprian Porumbescu, was published in the newspaper Freedom of Albania in Sofia, Bulgaria.
- Born: Phillip Law, Australian explorer, director of the Australian National Antarctic Research Expeditions from 1949 to 1966; in Tallangatta, Victoria, Australia (d. 2010).
- Died: Yung Wing, 83, Chinese-born American academic, first student of Chinese ethnicity to graduate from an American university (b. 1828).

== April 22, 1912 (Monday) ==
- Tornadoes swept through Illinois and Indiana killed 72, with the hardest hit regions being Bush, Marion and Kankakee, Illinois, and Morocco, Indiana. Another 35 were killed in Oklahoma and Texas, with Rogers, Texas and Lugert, Oklahoma being destroyed.
- British Board of Trade president Sydney Buxton requested Lord Loreburn establish a royal commission to investigate into the cause of the sinking of the Titanic.
- The United States Chamber of Commerce, the largest lobbying group in the United States, was established in Washington, D.C.
- The Wage Earner's Suffrage League gathered at Cooper Union, East Village, Manhattan, New York City for their biggest rally to protest better pay and working conditions for women. However, it rapidly dissolved over the summer after leaders Clara Lemlich and Rose Schneiderman left the organization.
- English pilot Denys Corbett Wilson completed the first completely successful aeroplane crossing of the Irish Sea, from Goodwick in Wales to Crane near Enniscorthy in Ireland. Robert Loraine's flight in 1910, which had been credited as the first crossing, was 200 feet short of its destination.
- The date of the first issue of Pravda, the official newspaper of the Communist Party, and the leading newspaper for the Soviet Union between 1922 and 1991, was 22 April 1912. Russia was using the Julian Calendar at the time, 13 days behind the Gregorian calendar. In later years, Pravda would carry on its front page the slogan "Founded by V. I. Lenin on May 5, 1912."
- French composer Paul Dukas premiered his ballet La Péri at the Théâtre du Châtelet in Paris.
- Born:
  - Kathleen Ferrier, English opera singer, known for her collaborations with the Royal Opera House; in Higher Walton, Lancashire, England (d. 1953).
  - Kaneto Shindo, Japanese film director, known for films including Children of Hiroshima, Onibaba, and Kuroneko; in Hiroshima, Empire of Japan (now Japan) (d. 2012).
- Died: Heinrich Unverricht, 58, German physician, pioneer in research on pneumonia and epilepsy (b. 1853).

== April 23, 1912 (Tuesday) ==
- The very first New Hampshire presidential primary was held, marking the first time that voters in New England decided on the delegates for a party nomination. U.S. President William Howard Taft defeated former U.S. President Theodore Roosevelt.
- Italian troops seized control of the Turkish island of Stampalia.
- Died: Stilson Hutchins, 73, American publisher and founder of The Washington Post (b. 1838).

== April 24, 1912 (Wednesday) ==
- The RMS Olympic, sister ship of the White Star ocean liner Titanic, was barred from departing Southampton, England with its 1,400 passengers because of a strike by shipworkers over insufficient lifeboats. The White Star Line had added 16 "collapsible" boats which could be deployed in a hurry.
- Troops killed striking textile workers at Vila Nova de Gaia, a suburb of Porto, Portugal.
- The main classroom and office of State Normal School in Cheney, Washington was destroyed by fire. Plans to rebuild were delayed when Washington state governor Marion E. Hay, who supported funding to rebuild, lost the state election to Ernest Lister, who opposed funding. The state allowed special funding for the school, but no other state school, in 1913. More than $92,000 was granted in 1915.
- The Government of New South Wales granted 43 acres (17 ha) of land for the construction of a zoological garden, later known as Taronga Park, in Sydney, Australia.
- Barnsley defeated West Bromwich Albion 1–0 at the 41st FA Cup held at the Crystal Palace in London, with Harry Tufnell scoring the single winning goal.
- Born: Aymoré Moreira, Brazilian football player, goalkeeper for the Brazil national football team from 1932 to 1940 and Botafogo from 1936 to 1946; in Miracema, Rio de Janeiro, Brazil (d. 1998).
- Died: Justin McCarthy, 81, Irish politician, leader of the Irish National Federation (b. 1830).

== April 25, 1912 (Thursday) ==
- The Reichstag defeated the proposal to increase Germany's army and navy.
- The rebuilt historic tower of St Mark's Campanile was inaugurated in Venice after nearly a decade of work.
- The satirical Catalan language magazine ¡Cu-Cut! published a cover parodying Francesc Cambó and the Regionalist League of Catalonia, one of the leading right wing political parties in Catalonia, Spain. The cover was offensive enough for the League to force the magazine to shut down soon after.
- Born:
  - Iris Faircloth Blitch, American politician, fourth female U.S. Representative for Georgia (served 1955-1963); in Toombs County, Georgia, United States (d. 1993).
  - Gladys Presley, American matriarch, mother of Elvis Presley; in Pontotoc County, Mississippi, United States (d. 1955).
  - Donald C. Spencer, American mathematician, known for his research into geometric deformation and the Spencer cohomology; in Boulder, Colorado, United States (d. 2001).

== April 26, 1912 (Friday) ==
- The bazaar, shopping quarter for Syrians in Damascus, caught on fire, causing $10,000,000 in damages and killing several persons.
- Sergei Mironovich Kostrikov, an early leader in Russia's Bolshevik movement, first took on the pen name "Kirov." After his assassination in 1934 while serving as the Communist Party chief in Leningrad, the Russian city of Kirov, the Russian Kirov Oblast, and the Ukrainian city of Kirovohrad were all named in his honor.
- Irish pilot Vivian Hewitt made an airplane crossing of the Irish Sea from Holyhead to Phoenix Park, Dublin.
- The official opening of the Château Laurier hotel in Ottawa was postponed to June 12, 1912, due to the death of Grand Trunk Railway president Charles Melville Hays, who perished aboard the Titanic on April 15.
- The Colorado Mountain Club, which was instrumental in the creation of the Rocky Mountain National Park, was founded.
- Born: A. E. van Vogt, Canadian science fiction writer, author of The Voyage of the Space Beagle and The Weapon Shops of Isher; in Gretna, Manitoba, Canada (d. 2000).

== April 27, 1912 (Saturday) ==
- Civil war broke out again in Paraguay, with former President Albino Jara commanding rebels at Villa Encarnacion. Four Paraguayan warships bombarded the rebels, who returned fire with cannons and forced the troops to withdraw.
- China cancelled a $50,000,000 munitions contract with a Belgian firm after protests by the four powers (the United States, United Kingdom, France and Germany).
- Incumbent Digby Denham was re-elected Premier of Queensland.
- Born: Zohra Sehgal, Indian stage and film actress, known for her film and television roles including The Jewel in the Crown and Bend It Like Beckham, recipient of the Padma Shri; in Saharanpur, United Provinces of Agra and Oudh, British India (now in Uttar Pradesh state) (d. 2014).

== April 28, 1912 (Sunday) ==
- Hubert Lyautey was appointed as the first French Resident-General of Morocco, which had recently become a protectorate of France. General Lyautey would administer most of the affairs of the Kingdom of Morocco until 1925. The city of Kenitra was renamed "Port Lyautey" in his honor, from 1933 to 1956, until reverting to its former name.
- Albanian emigrants established the Pan-Albanian Federation of America in New York City to advocate for an independent Albania from the Ottoman Empire.
- Born: Odette Hallowes, French Special Operations Executive agent, most decorated agent and witness at the Hamburg Ravensbrück trials, recipient of the George Cross, Order of the British Empire, and Legion of Honour; in Amiens, France (d. 1995).
- Died: Jules Bonnot, 35, French criminal, leader of the Bonnot Gang of armed robbers, after being wounded in a shootout with police at Choisy-le-Roi, France (b. 1876).

== April 29, 1912 (Monday) ==
- The sinking of the Turkish steamship SS Texas killed 69 of the 139 passengers and crew after the ship struck an undersea mine in the Gulf of Smyrna. Though not a U.S. ship, the Texas had been authorized to fly the American flag during the Italo-Turkish War.
- Tornadoes devastated Oklahoma over 72 hours, affecting 15 cities, killing 40 people, and injuring 120 more.
- Elections were held for the Territorial Council in the Yukon.
- The thermometer rose to 108 °F (42.2 °C) at the city of Tuguegarao, setting a record for the highest recorded temperature not only in the Philippines, but also for the islands of the South Pacific Ocean.
- Born: Richard Carlson, American actor and director, known for his title role in the 1950s television Western Mackenzie's Raiders; in Albert Lea, Minnesota, United States (d. 1977).
- Died: Subh-i-Azal, 81, Persian religious leader, leading figure in Bábism (b. 1831).

== April 30, 1912 (Tuesday) ==
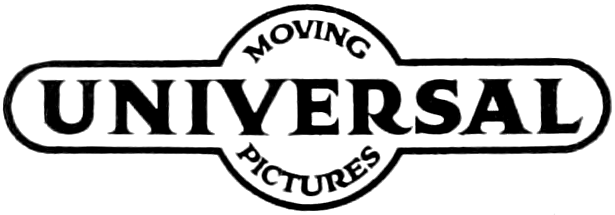
Universal Moving Pictures logo

- Filmmaker Carl Laemmle formed the Universal Film Manufacturing Company in New York City. In June, he partnered with other regional film companies to form the precursor to the Universal Pictures, the longest continuously running movie studio in the United States.
- Incumbent Elliott Lewis was re-elected as Premier of Tasmania, but opposition in his own Liberal Party forced him to resign in June and be replaced by Albert Solomon.
- The cable ship Mackay-Bennett and the RMS Olympic arrived at Halifax, Nova Scotia, bringing the bodies of 200 people who had drowned or frozen to death after escaping the Titanic. Although the ship had recovered 306 bodies, 116 of those were buried at sea because of a lack of sufficient embalming fluid, including 54 that had been identified. Located were the remains of John Astor and Isidor Straus, while his wife Ida Straus and former presidential adviser Archibald Butt were never located. One of the bodies recovered was a 19-month old toddler referred to in the media as "The Unknown Child." The identity of the child remained a mystery until 2007, when DNA research identified him as Sidney Leslie Goodwin. He was buried at Fairview Lawn Cemetery, in Halifax.
- A statue of Peter Pan by George Frampton was erected intentionally without fanfare in Kensington Gardens, London. Playwright J. M. Barrie, who created the "Peter Pan; or, the Boy Who Wouldn't Grow Up," wanted the impression of the statue appearing magically in the park, although he tipped off the public of its whereabout in The Times the following day.
- Born: Sam DeCavalcante, American gangster, leader of the DeCavalcante crime family; in Brooklyn, New York City, United States (d. 1997).
