= May 1912 =

Month of 1912

| << | May 1912 | | | | | >> |
| Su | Mo | Tu | We | Th | Fr | Sa |
| | | | 1 | 2 | 3 | 4 |
| 5 | 6 | 7 | 8 | 9 | 10 | 11 |
| 12 | 13 | 14 | 15 | 16 | 17 | 18 |
| 19 | 20 | 21 | 22 | 23 | 24 | 25 |
| 26 | 27 | 28 | 29 | 30 | 31 |

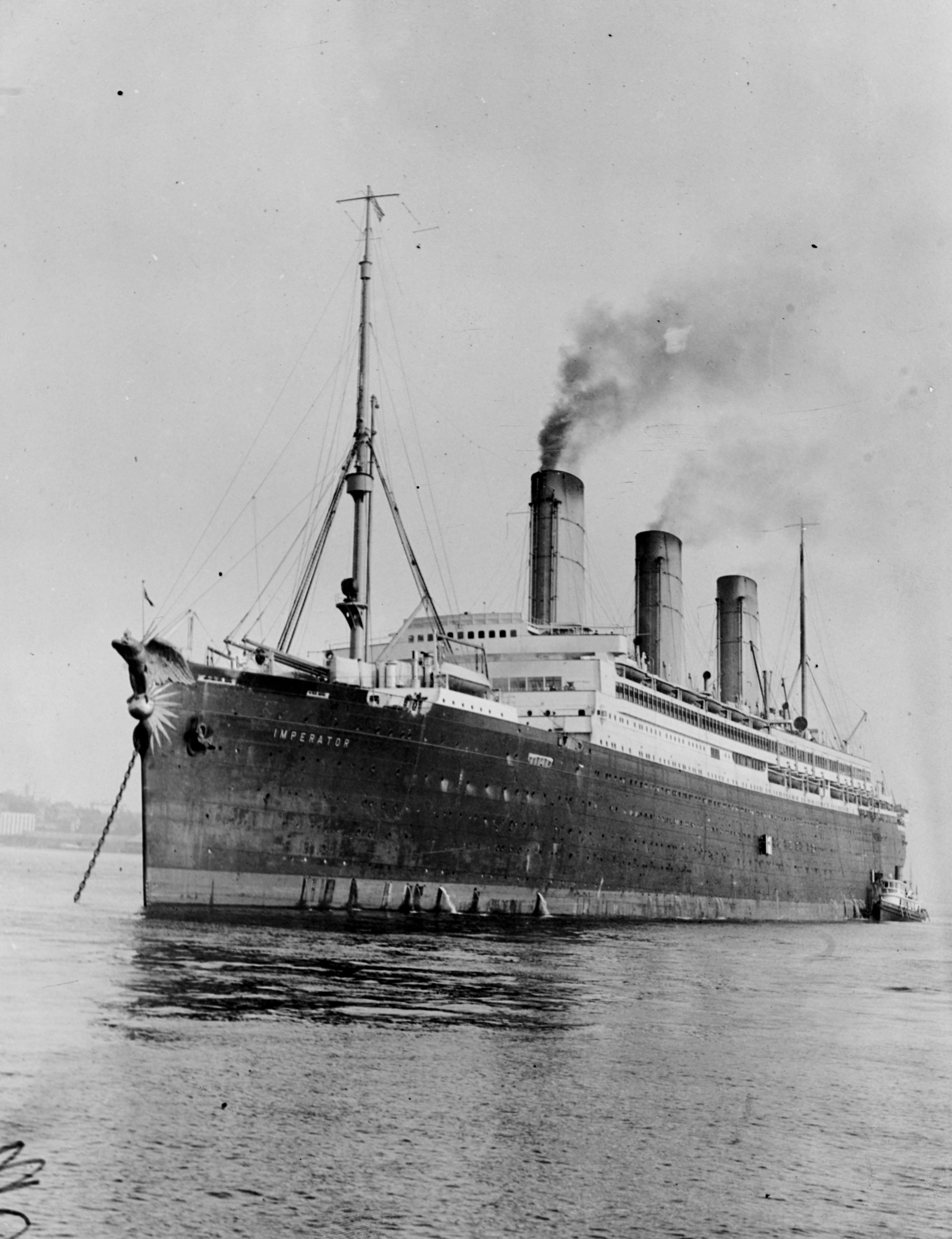
May 23, 1912: Imperator, world's largest ocean liner, is launched

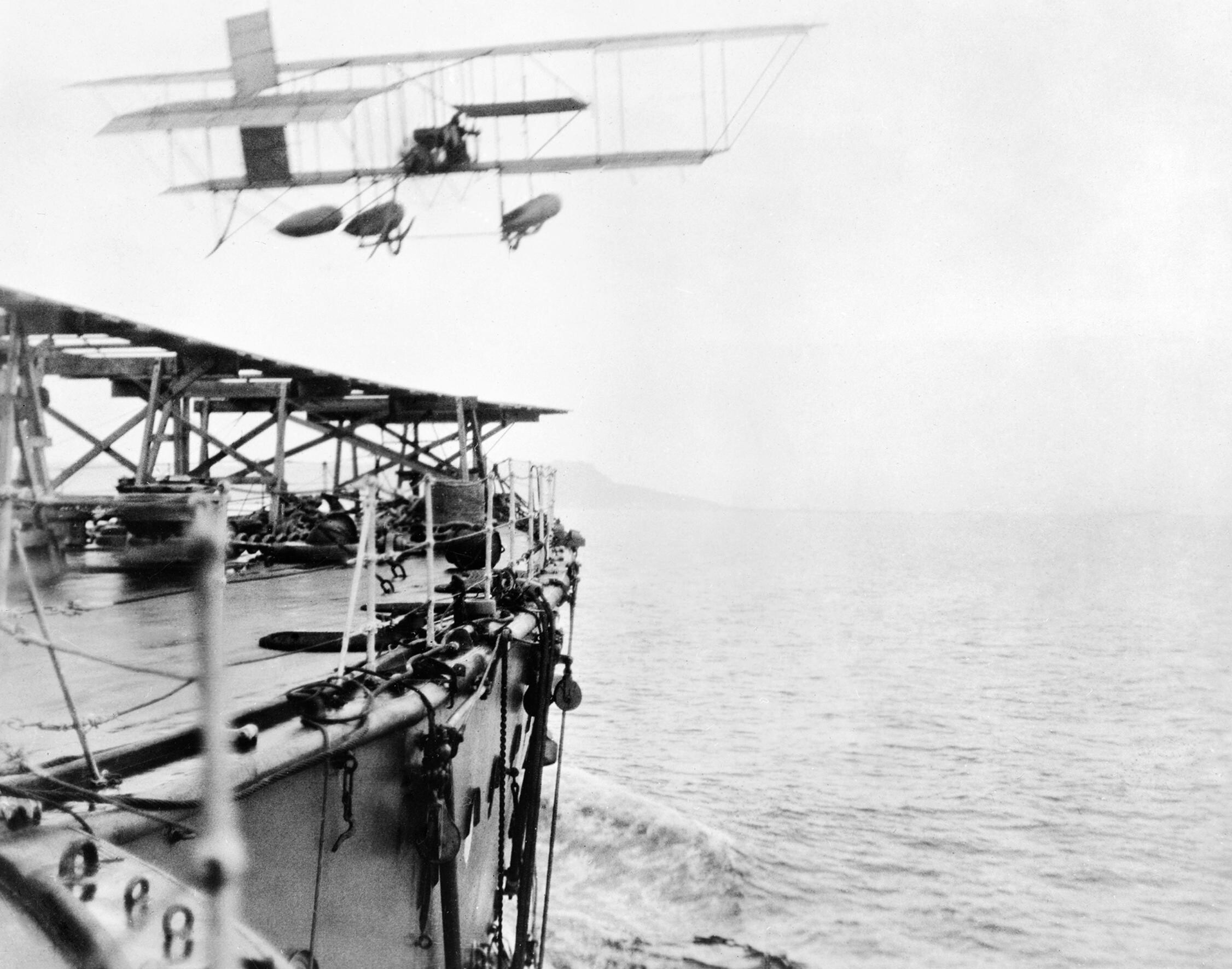
May 9, 1912: Royal Navy Commander Samson of HMS Hibernia becomes first pilot to take off from a moving ship

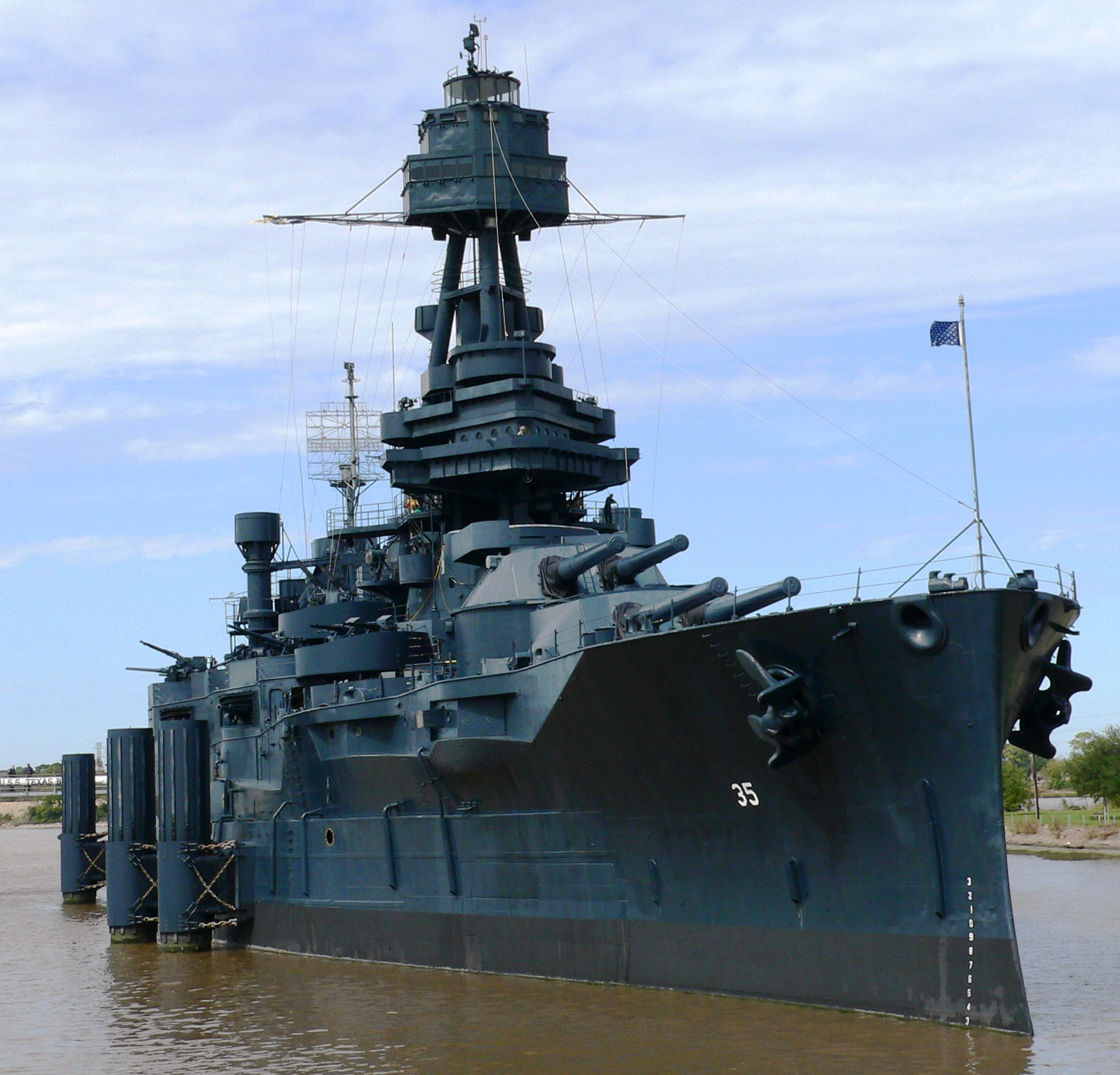
May 18, 1912: USS Texas, largest U.S. warship, launched

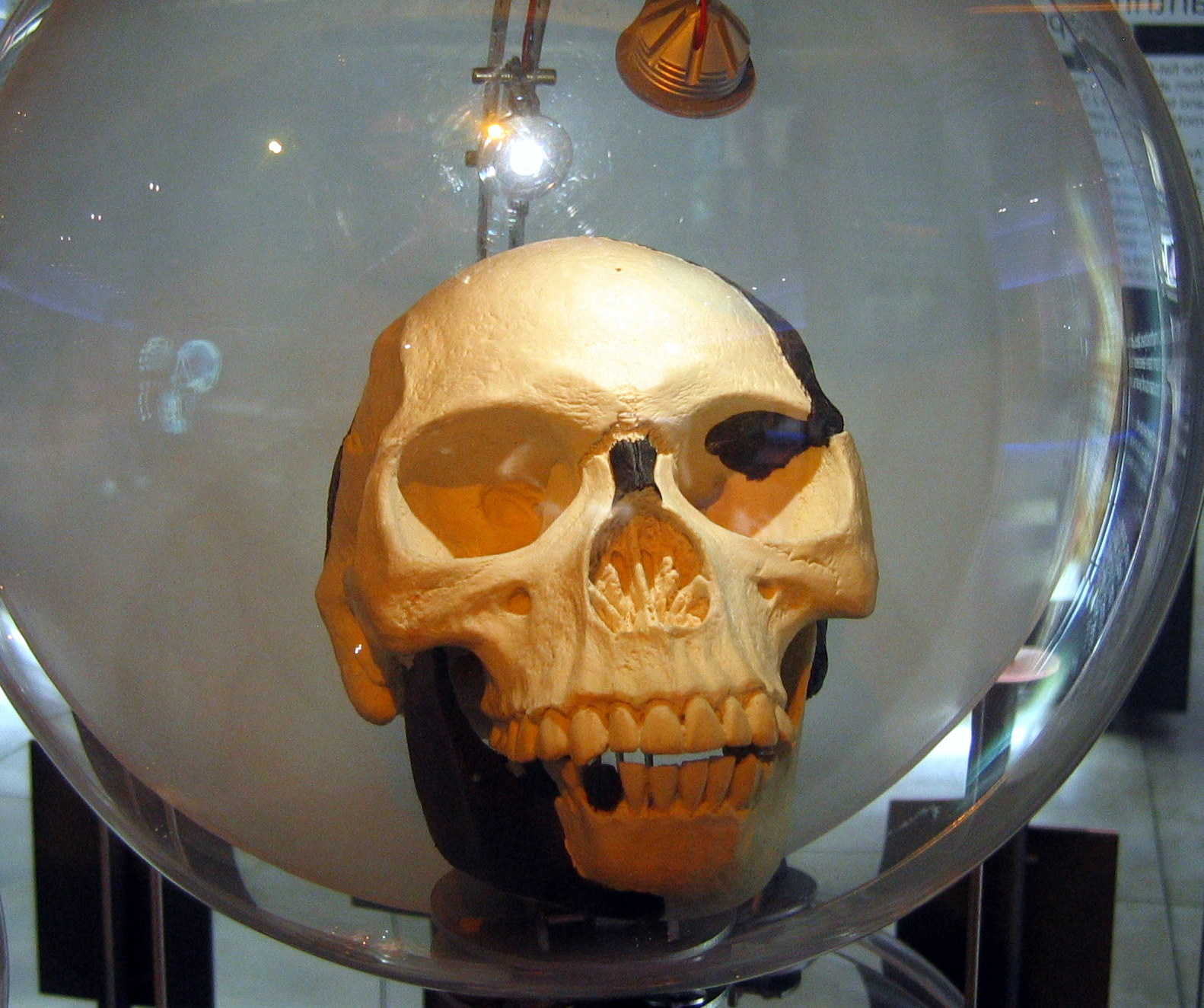
May 24, 1912: Piltdown Man hoax continues with delivery of skull fragments

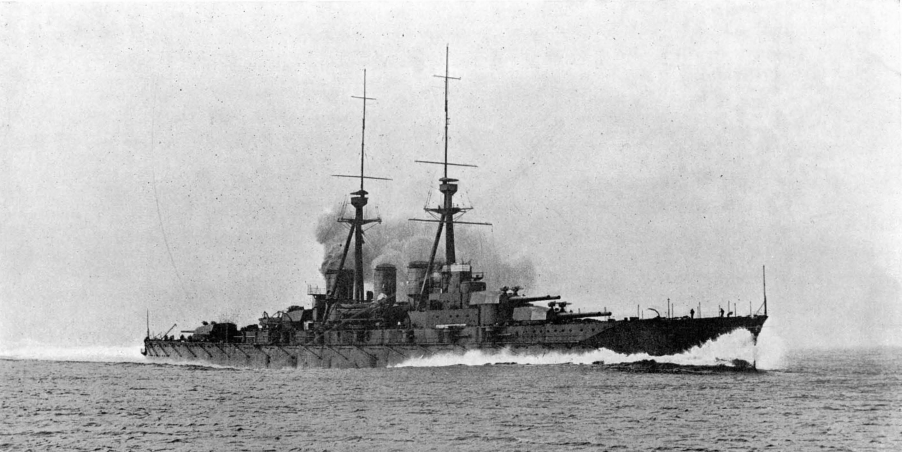
May 18, 1912: Kongō, Japan's largest Japanese battleship is launched

The following events occurred in May 1912:

== May 1, 1912 (Wednesday) ==
- The first aircraft with an enclosed cabin for the pilot was flown by Avro in England.
- ʻAbdu'l-Bahá, leader of the Baháʼí Faith, laid the cornerstone for the Baháʼí House of Worship in Wilmette, Illinois while touring the United States. However, construction of the largest Baha'i temple in the U.S. would not be not completed until 1953.
- Archbishop St Clair Donaldson consecrated the St James Parish Hall in Toowoomba, Australia. It was listed in the Queensland Heritage Register in 1995.
- A rail line of 44 miles 69 chains (72.2 kilometres) in length opened between Firham and Vrede in Free State, South Africa.
- The Pittsburgh and Castle Shannon Plane coal rail line ceased operations at Mount Washington, Pittsburgh.
- Congressman Oscar Underwood of Alabama won the Democratic primary in Georgia, defeating New Jersey Governor Woodrow Wilson.
- A strike between news print workers and supporting union began in Chicago after pressmen were locked out from the printing plants owned by William Randolph Hearst. They were joined by other unions in the news businesses throughout the month, but the strike ended in November with no new contracts with the newspaper publishers.
- The United States Baseball League, an 8-team challenger to the National League and American League, played its first game, with New York and the visiting team from Reading, Pennsylvania, playing to a 10–10 tie before a crowd of 2,500. Other games played on opening day were Richmond 2, Washington 0; Pittsburgh 11, Cleveland 7; and Chicago 5, Cincinnati 0. After teams dropped out, the season, which was set to run until September 21, ended on June 26.
- Born:
  - Otto Kretschmer, German naval officer, commander of German U-boats U-23 and U-99 which sank 47 ships in the first 18 months of World War II, recipient of the Knight's Cross of the Iron Cross, in Neisse, German Empire (now Nysa, Poland) (d. 1998)
  - Winthrop Rockefeller, American politician, 37th Governor of Arkansas, in New York City (d. 1973)

== May 2, 1912 (Thursday) ==
- The first nighttime reconnaissance flight in history was made by Italian Army Captain Alberto Margenhi Marengoon, who used an airplane to assess Ottoman troop strength near Benghazi, Libya.
- Local tribes revolted around Khost, Afghanistan, against the reign of Emir Habibullah Khan.
- The royal commission headed by Lord Mersey began their investigation of the sinking of the Titanic.
- The "Symphony for Negro Music" was performed at Carnegie Hall by the all-black Clef Club Orchestra, with 125 singers and musicians led by conductor James Reese Europe, and marked the most prestigious event for African-American musicians up to that time.
- Born:
  - Marten Toonder, Dutch cartoonist, creator of Tom Puss and Panda; in Rotterdam (d. 2005)
  - Axel Springer, German publisher, founder of Axel Springer SE; in Altona, Hamburg (d. 1985)
- Died: Homer Davenport, 45, American cartoonist, best known for his political cartoons for the New York Journal-American and New York Evening Mail, died of pneumonia after a two-week illness. (b. 1867)

== May 3, 1912 (Friday) ==
- Ahmed al-Hiba of Morocco, outraged at the Sultan's signing of a treaty to make Morocco a French protectorate, declared himself "Imam al-Mujahideen" (leader of the uprising) and began inciting rebellions throughout the North African nation.
- French filmmaker Georges Méliès released The Conquest of the Pole, a fantastical loose adaptation of the Jules Verne polar exploration novel Voyages extraordinaires. The film bombed and added to Méliès' financial difficulties which led to eventually dissolving his partnership with Charles Pathé later that year, but most contemporary film critics rank it as equal to his earlier successes including A Trip to the Moon and The Impossible Voyage.
- The 59 unidentified bodies recovered from Titanic by CS Mackay-Bennett were buried at three cemeteries in Halifax, Nova Scotia.
- Born:
  - Virgil Fox, American musician, known for his "Heavy Organ" recordings for RCA and Capitol Records, in Princeton, Illinois (d. 1980)
  - May Sarton, Belgium-American writer, known for her poetry collections including Encounter in April and prose such as The Single Hound and Journal of a Solitude, in Wondelgem, Belgium (d. 1995)

== May 4, 1912 (Saturday) ==
- The Battle of Rhodes began as Rhodes, largest of the Dodecanese islands that had historically been a part of Greece, was captured by Italy from the Ottoman Empire.
- The sailors of RMS Olympic were found guilty of mutiny, but no penalty was imposed.
- The Blackburn Rovers defeated the Queens Park Rangers 2-1 during a charity football game for survivors of the sinking of the Titanic in Tottenham, London, England.
- Pro Vercelli shut out Venezia 13–0 in the final for the Prima Categoria football league championship.
- A statue by sculptor Jerome Connor of John Carroll, the first Catholic bishop appointed in the United States, was unveiled on Georgetown University campus by Chief Justice Edward Douglass White.
- John Graham, a 63-year-old bear trapper, was killed by a bear on or near Crevice Mountain, near Yellowstone National Park. According to some accounts, the bear lost three toes on one paw to one of Graham's traps during the incident, and was subsequently known as "Old Two Toes".
- The Australian drama On Our Selection by Bert Bailey and Edmund Duggan opened at the Theatre Royal in Sydney and became a nation-wide success.
- Died: Nettie Stevens, 50, American biologist, credited for the discovery of the sex chromosome (b. 1861)

== May 5, 1912 (Sunday) ==
- Vladimir Lenin began the daily publication of Pravda (Russian for "The Truth"), the official newspaper of the Communist Party in Saint Petersburg, and later the leading daily paper for the Soviet Union between 1922 and 1991. The first issue carried the date "22 April 1912" (22 Апрель 1912), because Russia was still using the Julian Calendar, which was 13 days behind the Gregorian calendar. The paper would later carry the slogan "Newspaper founded 5 May 1912 by V. I. Lenin". Until the fall of the Soviet Union in 1991, Pravda was the leading newspaper in the Communist nation.
- The first competitive events of the 1912 Summer Olympics took place in Stockholm, Sweden, with lawn tennis being played until May 12. Most of the competition took place between June 29 and July 22, with the opening ceremonies being held on July 6.
- The first issue of Our Sunday Visitor was introduced in Catholic churches throughout the United States. The 35,000 copies of the first issue sold for one cent apiece.
- Born: Adolf Ottman, Anne-Marie Ottman, Emma Ottman and Elisabeth Ottman, the longest-lived quadruplets to date, in Munich. All four were 79 years, 316 days old when Adolf became the first to die on March 17, 1992.

== May 6, 1912 (Monday) ==
- The will of John Astor, who died in the Titanic disaster, was probated. His $150,000,000 estate (worth more than $3.3 billion in 2012) was left to his 20-year-old son, Vincent Astor.
- The cable ship CS Minia brought 17 more bodies from the Titanic to Halifax, Nova Scotia. Only one of the persons had drowned, and the others had died of exposure to the cold.
- Born: Bill Quinn, American TV and film actor; in New York City (d. 1994)
- Died: Lie Kim Hok, 58, Chinese-Malay writer, credited as the "father of Chinese Malay literature" through works including Tjhit Liap Seng and Sair Tjerita Siti Akbari (b. 1853)

== May 7, 1912 (Tuesday) ==
- A machine gun was fired from an airplane for the first time, in a test conducted near the College Park, Maryland, airfield by the United States Army. Charles deForest Chandler, chief of the Aeronautical Division of the Signal Corps, was able to fire a 28-pound (13 kg) Lewis gun to hit targets on the ground, while Lt. Thomas D. Milling piloted the Wright biplane.
- Over 150 waiters and staff at a hotel in New York City went on strike to protest poor working conditions. The labour unrest spread to encompass 54 hotels and 30 restaurants throughout the city, with 2,500 waiters, 1,000 cooks, and 3,000 hotel workers going on strike.
- Born:
  - Frank Reginald Carey, British air force officer, commander of the No. 135 Squadron during World War II, recipient of the Order of the British Empire, Distinguished Flying Cross, and Distinguished Flying Medal; in Brixton, London (d. 2004)
  - Ma Sicong, Chinese composer and musician, known as "The King of Violinists" in China before fleeing with his family to Hong Kong during the Cultural Revolution; in Haifeng County, Guangdong province (d. 1987)

== May 8, 1912 (Wednesday) ==
Paramount Pictures founded

- Pascual Orozco, who had helped in the revolution that made Francisco I. Madero the President of Mexico six months earlier, then led a second revolution against Madero, ordered his 6,000 insurrectionists to fight against Madero's troops at the state of Coahuila. Reports of the day described the oncoming clash as "the greatest body of rebels and government troops that has ever come together...in what is expected to be the turning point of the revolution".
- Filmmaker Adolph Zukor became one of the three founders of Paramount Pictures. He produced one of America's first feature-length films, and is the also the longest continuous running movie studio in the United States.
- Born: John Deakin, English photographer, known for his collaborations with painter Francis Bacon, including Three Studies of Lucian Freud; in New Ferry, Merseyside (d. 1972)

== May 9, 1912 (Thursday) ==
- Royal Navy commander Charles Rumney Samson became the first pilot to take a plane into the air off of a ship in motion, when he flew his airplane off of HMS Hibernia, which was moving at a speed of 10 knots (19 km/h; 12 mph).
- At Royal Albert Hall in London, a crowd of 7,000 turned out for the last public appearance of William Booth, founder of The Salvation Army. Booth would die on August 20.
- Born: Pedro Armendáriz, Mexican actor, known for his collaborations with filmmakers Emilio Fernández and John Ford; in Mexico City (d. 1963)

== May 10, 1912 (Friday) ==
- Rebel forces overcame Paraguayan government troops led by former Paraguayan President Albino Jara in the battle, near Paraguarí. Jara was fatally wounded in the battle. The victory brought an end to the year-long Paraguayan Civil War.
- Glenn L. Martin broke the existing record for a flight over water in an airplane, traveling 38 miles (61 km), from Newport Beach, California, to Catalina Island, in 37 minutes. He then flew back, against the wind, in 51 minutes.

== May 11, 1912 (Saturday) ==
- Rebel leader Eduardo Schaerer formally declared victory to end the 10 month-long civil war in Paraguay, which had claimed 5,000 lives during the fighting.
- W. B. Atwater, a salesman for the Curtiss Aeroplane and Motor Company, persuaded the Imperial Japanese Navy to begin developing its own air corps. Atwater impressed the Minister of the Navy, Admiral Saitō Makoto, by taking aloft a Curtiss hydroplane from the ocean, in the first water takeoff ever seen in the Orient. On the third and final flight, Atwater took one of the Japanese officers with him as a passenger, then dropped a message to the Minister Saito. Japan bought four Curtiss Triads. "From this slight beginning," author Walter J. Boyne would note later, "grew the naval air force that twenty-nine years later would strike at Pearl Harbor."
- The Kentucky Derby was won by the thoroughbred horse Worth, ridden by jockey Frank M. Taylor, with a time of 2:09.40.
- The musical Princess Caprice by Leo Fall opened at the Shaftesbury Theatre in London and ran for 265 performances.
- Born:
  - Foster Brooks, American character actor and comedian, best known for his collaboration with Dean Martin and his routine of portraying intoxicated people; in Louisville, Kentucky (d. 2001)
  - Saadat Hasan Manto, Pakistani writer, known his short stories in the Urdu language; in Samrala, Punjab, British India (d. 1955)

== May 12, 1912 (Sunday) ==
- Bulgaria and Serbia signed a mutual defense treaty, with Bulgaria pledging 200,000 men to defend Serbia against an attack by Austria-Hungary, while Serbia agreed to send 200,000 to protect against a Bulgarian invasion by Romania, and each pledging to assist the other in a fight against the Ottoman Empire.
- The decommissioned Royal Navy submarine HMS A3 was sunk for a second and final time during naval target practice in the English Channel. It had sunk on February 2 after it accidentally collided with HMS Hazard during training exercises off the Isle of Wight. The Royal Navy salvaged it in March.
- Born: William C. Sullivan, assistant director of the FBI from 1961 to 1971; in Bolton, Massachusetts (accidentally killed, 1977)

== May 13, 1912 (Monday) ==
- The United States House of Representatives voted 237–39 to send the proposed Seventeenth Amendment to the United States Constitution, which provided for U.S. Senators to be elected directly by popular vote, rather than by the state legislatures, for ratification. An amendment for direct election of U.S. Senators had first been proposed in 1826. In 1894, 1898, 1900 and 1902, the House had approved an amendment and the Senate had rejected it. The 17th amendment would be ratified by April 8, 1913, after Connecticut became the 36th of 48 states to give its approval.
- The remains of three people, who had been able to escape the sinking Titanic in a lifeboat, but died while awaiting rescue, were located by another White Star Line steamer, RMS Oceanic. Passenger Thomson Beattie and two of the ship's firemen (who could not be identified) had managed to get into one of the collapsible lifeboats, but drifted for a month after the ship sank, dying from hypothermia or thirst along the way. Another three bodies of Titanic victims were recovered by the Canadian government ship Montmagny and brought to Louisbourg, Nova Scotia, where they were shipped to Halifax via the Sydney and Louisburg Railway.
- The first jury trial ever conducted in China began in Shanghai.
- Italian ships captured more islands from the Ottoman Empire, seizing Piskopi, Nisero, Kalismo, Leno and Patmos.
- The first known investigation into an air crash began after a Flanders F.2 monoplane crashed at Brooklands, Surrey, England, killing the pilot and passenger. The investigators would conclude that the accident was caused by pilot error.
- Born: Gil Evans (stage name for Ian Ernest Gilmore Green), Canadian jazz composer, best known for his collaborations with Miles Davis; in Toronto (d. 1988)

== May 14, 1912 (Tuesday) ==
- King Frederik of Denmark collapsed and died during an evening stroll while on vacation in Germany. Found alone, and with no identification, the 68-year old monarch was taken as a "John Doe" to a morgue in a local hospital before his fellow travelers realized he was missing.
- In the California presidential primaries, Theodore Roosevelt won all 26 of the Republican delegates, defeating William Howard Taft in all 58 counties. Former House Speaker Champ Clark won the Democratic delegates, defeating Woodrow Wilson by a 2-1 ratio. Women, though not allowed to vote in national elections, were able to participate in the primaries.

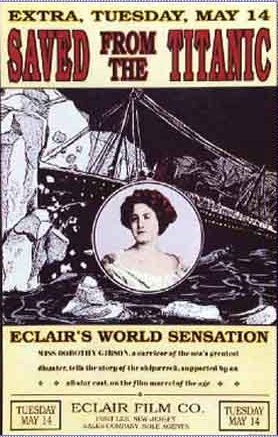

- China's legislature rejected the six-power railroad loan agreement.

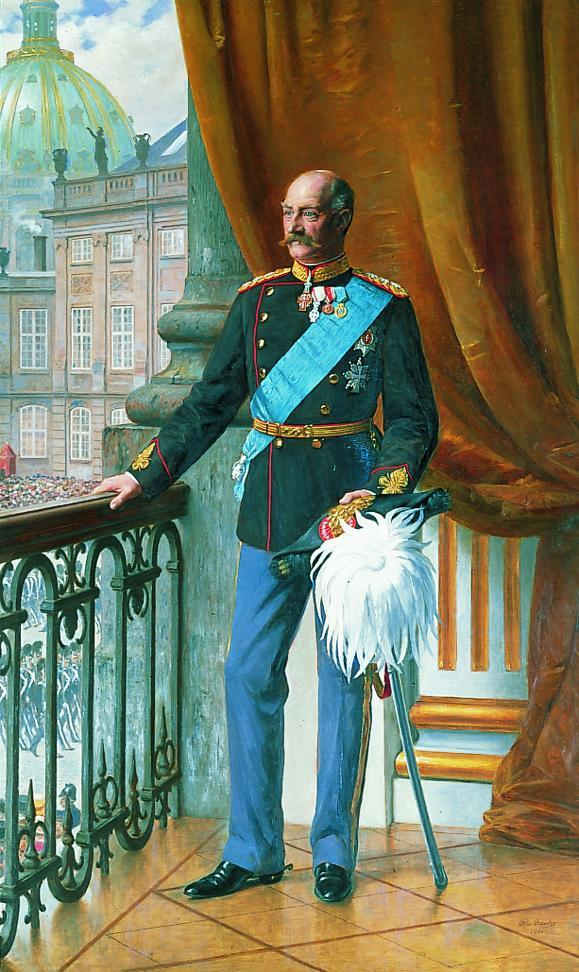
King Frederik VIII

- Saved from the Titanic, a silent film produced by the Eclair Film Company and starring Dorothy Gibson, was released in the United States. Coming out on the one-month anniversary of the day the Titanic struck the iceberg, it was the first disaster film, and the first to use special effects, interspersing film of the RMS Olympic with models "sometimes resembling a toy boat in a bathtub" to recreate the sinking. Ms. Gibson, at the time the most famous movie star in America, actually had been a passenger on the ship when it began to sink, and literally had been "saved from the Titanic".
- Died:
  - August Strindberg, 63, Swedish writer, author of novels such as The Red Room and plays such as The Father and Miss Julie (b. 1849)
  - Albino Jara, 35, President of Paraguay from January to July 1911, died of wounds received in combat on May 10. (b. 1877)

== May 15, 1912 (Wednesday) ==
- The Rikken Seiyūkai party won 209 of the 381 seats of the House of Representatives in general elections held in Japan. Voting was restricted to men aged over 25 who paid at least 10 yen a year in direct taxation.
- Crown Prince Christian, brother of King Haakon of Norway, was proclaimed as King Christian X of Denmark.
- Austrian Prime Minister Karl von Stürgkh stepped down due to sudden blindness caused by "an affection of the retina resulting from overwork" and was temporarily succeeded by the Interior Minister Baron von Heinold.
- Mohammed Ameziane, leader of insurgency in the Rif region of eastern Morocco, was killed by Spanish colonial forces, ending the near 10-month long revolt against Spain. Spanish losses were recorded at 500 killed and 1,900 wounded, while casualties among native Riffians remained unknown.
- The Grimsby and Immingham Electric Railway began operations, effectively closing the older Grimsby and Immingham rail stations in Lincolnshire, England, after only two years of service.
- Lomer Gouin of the Liberal Party was re-elected Premier of Quebec.

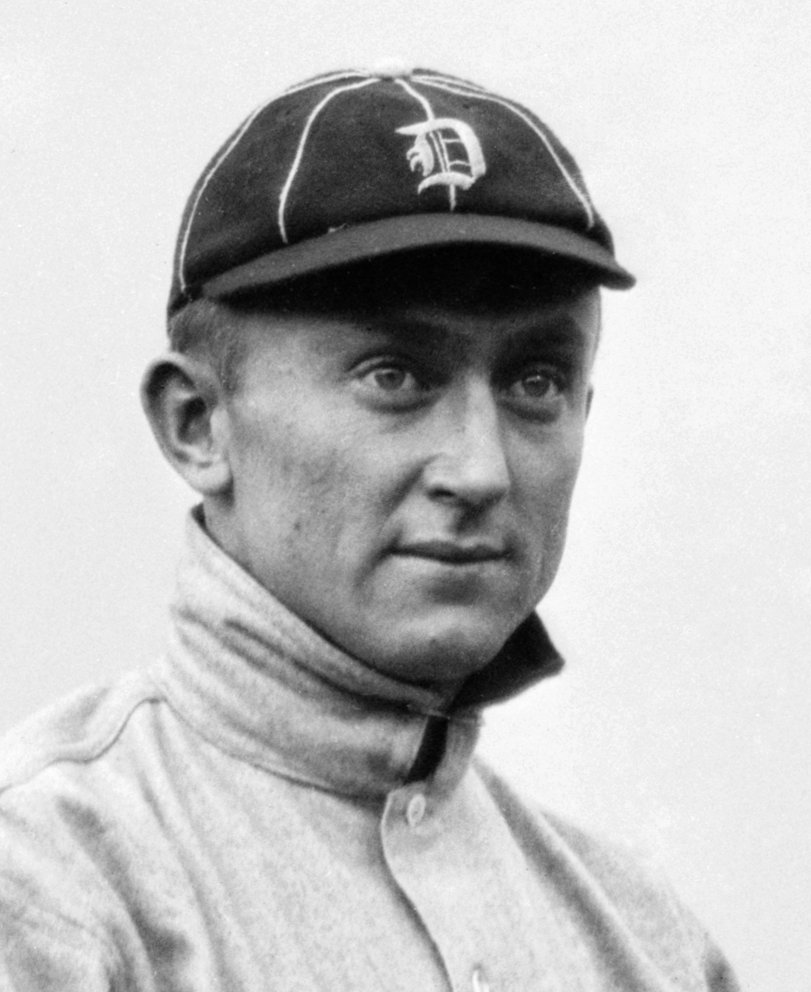
Batting king (.367) Ty Cobb

- Detroit Tigers baseball star Ty Cobb, angry after being taunted by New York Highlanders fan Claude Lueker at Hilltop Park, charged into the stands and punched and kicked his tormentor. Lueker, who was "a cripple, who lost one hand and three fingers of the other", said that when someone yelled "Don't kick him, he has no hands", Cobb replied "I don't care if he has no feet!" Cobb would be suspended by the American League for ten days, leading to a sympathy strike by his teammates on May 18.
- Labor activists Emma Goldman and Ben Reitman arrived in San Diego to support local members of the Industrial Workers of the World and their fight to hold public soap boxes in the city. Vigilantes hounded the couple, with Reitman reportedly being abducted from his hotel room and tortured in another location before being set free. Vigilantism eventually forced the end of the soap box campaigns to end by September.
- Born:
  - Arthur Berger, American composer, known for works including Serenade Concertante and Three Pieces for Strings; in New York City (d. 2003)
  - Alexis Kagame, Rwandan philosopher, leading contributor to African philosophy; in Kiyanza, German East Africa (now Kigali, Rwanda) (d. 1981)

== May 16, 1912 (Thursday) ==
- Two small boys who had survived the sinking of the Titanic were reunited with their mother after having been identified. Michel Navratil Jr., 3, and Edmond Navratil, 2, had been placed into a lifeboat by their father. Michel would be the last male survivor of the disaster, dying on January 31, 2001.
- Born: Studs Terkel, (pen name for Louis Terkel) American journalist, best known for promoting oral history in nonfiction, recipient of the Pulitzer Prize for General Nonfiction for The Good War; in New York City (d. 2008)

== May 17, 1912 (Friday) ==
- The opera Don Quichotte, composed by Jules Massenet, opened in London.
- The Socialist Party of America nominated Eugene V. Debs for president and Emil Seidel for vice president.
- Born:
  - Archibald Cox, American lawyer and Solicitor General of the United States (from 1961 to 1965), best known for serving as the special prosecutor in 1973 during the Watergate scandal before being fired on orders of U.S. President Nixon; in Plainfield, New Jersey (d. 2004)
  - Clarence "Ace" Parker, American football quarterback and inductee to the Pro Football Hall of Fame and the College Football Hall of Fame, who played for football's Brooklyn Dodgers and Boston Yanks from 1937 to 1945; in Portsmouth, Virginia (d. 2013)

== May 18, 1912 (Saturday) ==
- USS Texas and the Japanese battleship Kongō, the two largest warships up to that time, were launched on the same day.
- A suit was filed in New York City to break up the "Coffee Trust".
- Shree Pundalik, the first multi-reel motion picture, was released in India. It preceded by a few months the first American full-length feature, Queen Elizabeth.
- The Detroit Tigers baseball team walked out on strike only five minutes after the start of their game against the Philadelphia Athletics. The Tigers departed to protest the suspension of Ty Cobb three days earlier. Rather than forfeit the game, Tigers' manager Hughie Jennings recruited eight volunteers from the Philadelphia crowd to fill in for the day. Earning $25 apiece, "the nine sorry sheep who were masquerading in borrowed Tiger skins" lost the game, 24 to 2. One replacement player, Ed Irvin, was the only one of the Tigers to get a hit during the game. With two hits in three times at bat, Irvin had the distinction of a "career batting average" of .667 for his lone appearance in Major League Baseball.
- Born:
  - Perry Como, American singer, known for hit songs including "And I Love You So" and "Catch a Falling Star", recipient of five Emmy Awards; in Canonsburg, Pennsylvania (d. 2001)
  - Walter Sisulu, South African activist, served as Deputy President and Secretary-General of the African National Congress, in Ngcobo, South Africa (d. 2003)
  - Robert W. Young, American linguist, leading researcher on the Navajo language, co-founder of the Ádahooníłígíí Navajo newspaper, member of the Navajo code talker operation during World War II; in Chicago (d. 2007)
- Died: William Lee Rees, 75, New Zealand cricketer, batter for the Victoria cricket team from 1857 to 1865, and the Auckland cricket team in 1877 (b. 1836)

== May 19, 1912 (Sunday) ==
- Julia Clark of the United Kingdom became only the third woman in history to receive an airplane pilot's license. On June 17, she would become the first woman to be killed while piloting an airplane.
- Italian engineer Giuseppe Mario Bellanca taught himself to fly in series of short, tentative hops at Mineola Field outside Mineola, New York in front of onlookers. His success prompted him to establish the Bellanca School of Flying, which he operated from 1912 to 1916.
- Died:
  - Marcelino Menéndez y Pelayo, 55, Spanish writer, known for literary and historical non-fiction including A History of the Spanish Heterodox (b. 1856)
  - Bolesław Prus (pen name for Aleksander Glowacki), 64, Polish novelist, author of The Outpost, The Doll, The New Woman and Pharaoh (b. 1847)

== May 20, 1912 (Monday) ==
- Cuban Army General Jose de Jesus Monteagudo suspended constitutional rights in suppressing an uprising by black Cubans, and massacred 3,000 of the insurgents, as well as executing their leaders. Carlos Moore, author of Cuba, the Blacks, and Africa estimated that between 15,000 and 35,000 black Cubans were killed when including those who were lynched or shot.
- Félix Fuchs of Belgium became the Governor-General of the Belgian Congo.
- Nexhip Draga and Hasan Prishtina met with ethnic Albanian rebels at Junik, Kosovo to plan an uprising against the Ottoman Empire.
- A rail line of 10 miles 29 chains (16.7 kilometres) in length opened between Wolseley and Ceres, in Western Cape, South Africa.
- The Alexander Nevsky Cathedral was consecrated in Warsaw, becoming one of the tallest cathedrals in the city at the time. In post-war Poland, it was demolished as part of a political movement to remove Russian imperial properties and churches from the Polish landscape.
- Born:
  - J. L. Carr, English writer, author of A Day in Summer and A Month in the Country; in Thirsk, North Yorkshire (d. 1994)
  - Wilfrid Sellars, American philosopher, developer of critical realism; in Ann Arbor, Michigan (d. 1989)

== May 21, 1912 (Tuesday) ==
- The Reichstag overwhelmingly passed a law expanding the Imperial German Navy. The expansion called for three more battleships and two more light cruisers.
- The site for the outdoor fountain memorial to social activist Josephine Shaw Lowell was dedicated in Bryant Park, Manhattan, New York City, with the art installation completed the following year.
- The town of Sand Springs, Oklahoma was incorporated. It would have a population of almost 19,000 people a century later.
- Born: Monty Stratton, American baseball player, pitcher for the Chicago White Sox from 1934 to 1938; in Wagner, Texas (d. 1982)
- Died: Julius Wernher, 62, German-British industrialist, managed the development of mining in South Africa (b. 1850)

== May 22, 1912 (Wednesday) ==
- Mexican Federal troops commanded of General Victoriano Huerta defeated a rebel force of 8,000 fighters under command of Pascual Orozco at the Rellano rail station in Chihuahua, Mexico, resulting in at least 600 dead rebels and 140 federal troops killed or wounded. The battle effectively ended Orozco's rebellion.
- The U.S. Marines entered into military aviation, as 2nd Lieutenant Alfred A. Cunningham reported for flight training at the Navy Aviation Center.
- Count István Tisza, formerly the Prime Minister of Hungary, was elected President of the Hungarian Chamber of Deputies after a fight between the legislators. Reportedly, "all the inkpots and other articles that could be used as missiles were removed from the chamber before the voting began", and the Socialist Union party members walked out after fistfights broke out.
- Massachusetts became the first U.S. state to ratify the Seventeenth Amendment to the United States Constitution, as the state Senate voted 30–0 in favor of direct election of U.S. Senators, after the House had approved the measure by acclamation.
- The steamer Algerine recovered the body of Titanic saloon steward James McGrady.
- Born: Herbert C. Brown, English-American chemist, recipient of the Nobel Prize in Chemistry for his research into organoboron chemistry; as Herbert Brovarnik, in London (d. 2004)

== May 23, 1912 (Thursday) ==
- An earthquake measuring 7.5 to 8.0 in magnitude struck around the cities of Taunggyi and Pyin Oo Lwin in Burma, the largest recorded for the country. Despite the strength, only a single death was recorded. However, property damage in both cities extensive although final dollar figures were never recorded.

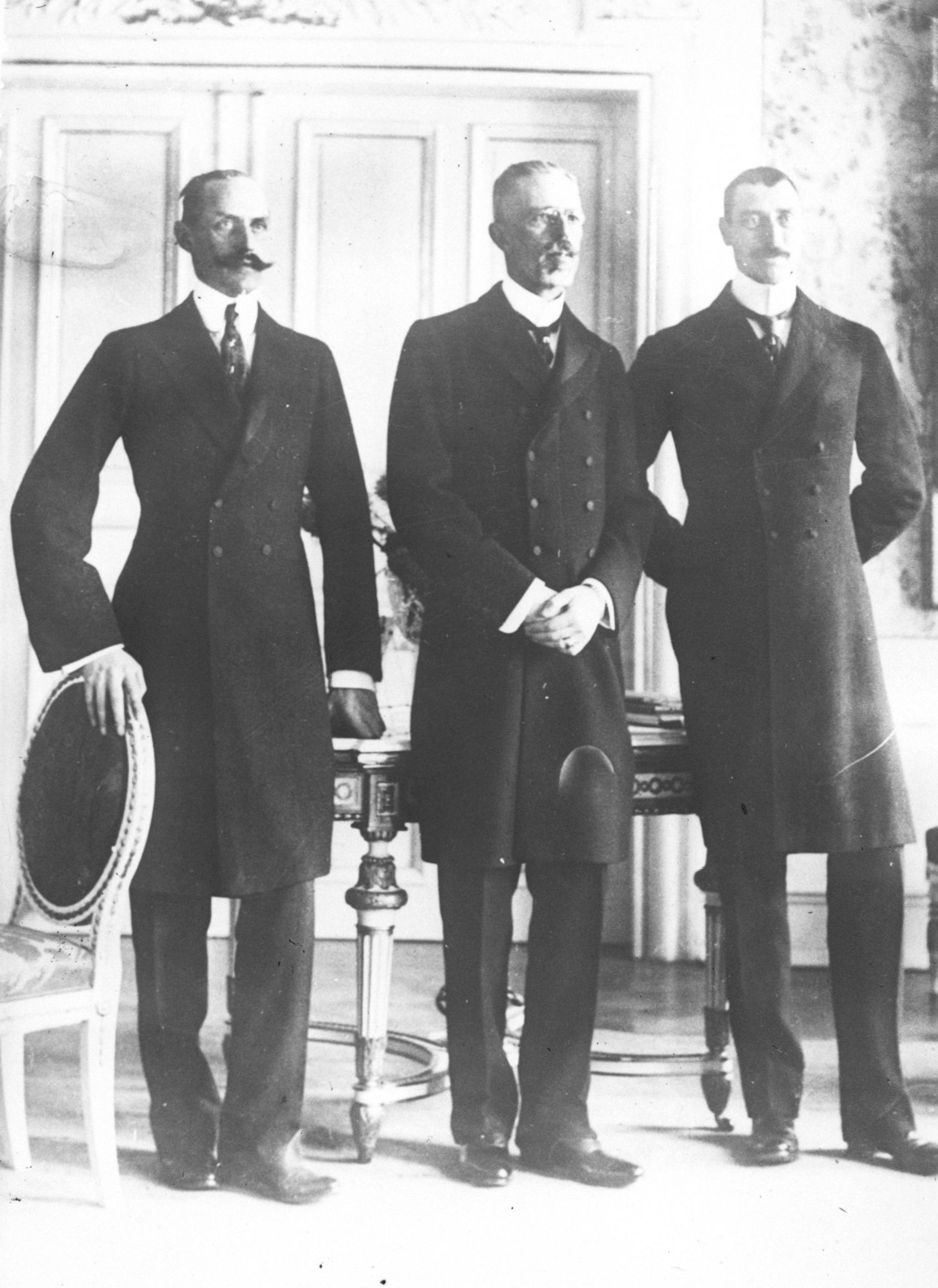
Haakon, Christian and Gustaf

- For the first time since the 10th century the three Scandinavian kings came together. Brothers Christian of Denmark and Haakon of Norway were at Roskilde, Denmark for the funeral of their father, the late Frederik of Denmark, and were joined by Gustaf of Sweden.
- The Hamburg America Line's SS Imperator was launched from the Vulcan Shipyards Hamburg as the world's largest ship. Kaiser Wilhelm himself christened the new ship, and almost suffered a serious injury in the process. As the ship moved down into the water, a large block of wood fell from the side, "missing the kaiser's head by only a few inches".
- U.S. President William Howard Taft dispatched the U.S. Marines to Cuba to protect Americans there during racial warfare.
- Born:
  - Jean Françaix, French composer, known for compositions including film scores for Napoléon and If Paris Were Told to Us; in Paris (d. 1997)
  - Marius Goring, English actor, known for his film roles in A Matter of Life and Death and The Red Shoes, as well as the lead in the BBC television series The Expert; in Newport, Isle of Wight, England (d. 1998)
  - John Payne, American actor, known for roles in Miracle on 34th Street and the television Western The Restless Gun; in Roanoke, Virginia (d. 1989)

== May 24, 1912 (Friday) ==
- Charles Dawson brought the first five skull fragments of the Piltdown Man to the British Museum. Dawson's "missing link" would be proven to be a hoax in 1953.
- The Short Brothers made a test flight for a new Short biplane for the Royal Navy.
- Born: Joan Hammond, New Zealand-Australian opera singer, known for her collaborations with Royal Opera House, La Scala, and Vienna State Opera; in Christchurch (d. 1996)
- Died: Heinrich Friedrich Weber, 68, German physicist, known for his research into specific heat capacity of certain elements (b. 1843)

== May 25, 1912 (Saturday) ==
- The Third Sonderbund International Art Exhibit opened in Cologne for a four-month presentation of artistic work from Vincent van Gogh, Paul Cézanne, Paul Gauguin, Pablo Picasso, Henri-Edmond Cross, Paul Signac and Edvard Munch.
- In Tyler, Texas, Dan Davis, an African-American who had confessed to raping and then slitting the throat of a young white woman on May 13, was burned at the stake after a mob of 2,000 people overpowered his jailers. Davis's executioners had brought "several wagon loads of wood" to the town's public square and tied him to a rail. After Davis said, "I am guilty," he was set ablaze.
- Born: Princess Deokhye, Korean noble and the last princess of the Korean Empire; in Changdeokgung, Japanese Korea (Chosen) (d. 1989)
- Died: Austin Lane Crothers, 52, Governor of Maryland from 1908 to 1912, died four months after completing his term. (b. 1860)

== May 26, 1912 (Sunday) ==
- American athlete James Duncan set the first records for throwing a discus, as recognized by the International Amateur Athletic Federation later in the year when the IAAF published its inaugural list of records. At Celtic Park in Queens, New York, Duncan hurled the discus with his right hand 156 feet 1¾ inches (47.59 metres). Later in the meet, using his left hand, he reached a distance of 96 feet 7½ inches. Thus, the standard for furthest combined distance with right hand and left hand became 252 feet, 9¼ inches. Despite having thrown one half-inch further than he would the next day, his May 27 discus throw became the first internationally recognized record for the discus throw, with a distance of 156 ft 1 1/4 in (47.581 m).
- Born:
  - János Kádár, Hungarian state leader, dictator of the Hungarian People's Republic and General Secretary of the Hungarian Socialist Workers' Party from 1956 to 1988; as János Csermanek, in Fiume, Austria-Hungary (now Rijeka, Croatia) (d. 1989)
  - Jay Silverheels, Canadian indigenous actor, best known for his role as Tonto in the 1950s television Western The Lone Ranger, as Harold J. Smith, at Six Nations of the Grand River near Brantford, Ontario (d. 1980)

== May 27, 1912 (Monday) ==
- A fire at a movie theater in Villa Real in Spain killed 80 people.
- The French battleship Foudre became the first naval ship to be outfitted as a seaplane tender, with Canard Voisin floatplane assigned to the ship.
- Born:
  - Sam Snead, American golfer, all-time winner of the PGA Tour, three-time winner of the Masters Tournament and PGA Championship, and 1946 winner of the British Open; in Ashwood, Virginia (d. 2002)
  - John Cheever, American writer, author of The Wapshot Chronicle series, recipient of the Pulitzer Prize for Fiction for his short story collection The Stories of John Cheever; in Quincy, Massachusetts (d. 1982)
  - Cedric Phatudi, South African state leader, Chief Minister of Lebowa, South Africa from 1973 to 1987; in Mphahlele, Transvaal, South Africa (d. 1987)

== May 28, 1912 (Tuesday) ==
- Ireland's Labour Party (Páirtí an Lucht Oibre) was founded in Clonmel, County Tipperary, by James Connolly, James Larkin, and William O'Brien as the political wing of the Irish Trades Union Congress. Its best showing in the Dáil would come in its 100th year, with 37 seats in the 2011 election.
- The U.S. Senate subcommittee to investigate the sinking of RMS Titanic filed its report, recommending multiple changes in safety practices in passenger shipping. A British inquiry into the tragedy would conclude with a July 3 report to Parliament.
- Born: Patrick White, English-Australian writer, recipient of the Nobel Prize in Literature for works including The Tree of Man and The Burnt Ones, in Knightsbridge, London, England (d. 1990)

== May 29, 1912 (Wednesday) ==
- The Afternoon of a Faun, a ballet choreographed and performed by Vaslav Nijinsky, premiered at the Théâtre du Châtelet in Paris. Inspired by a poem of the same name by Stéphane Mallarmé and using the music of Claude Debussy's Prelude to the Afternoon of a Faun, the ballet shocked the French audience. As the Faun, Nijinsky was booed as he closed the ballet with "vile movements of erotic bestiality and gestures of heavy shamelessness"; he would revise the ending under threat of intervention by Paris police.

== May 30, 1912 (Thursday) ==
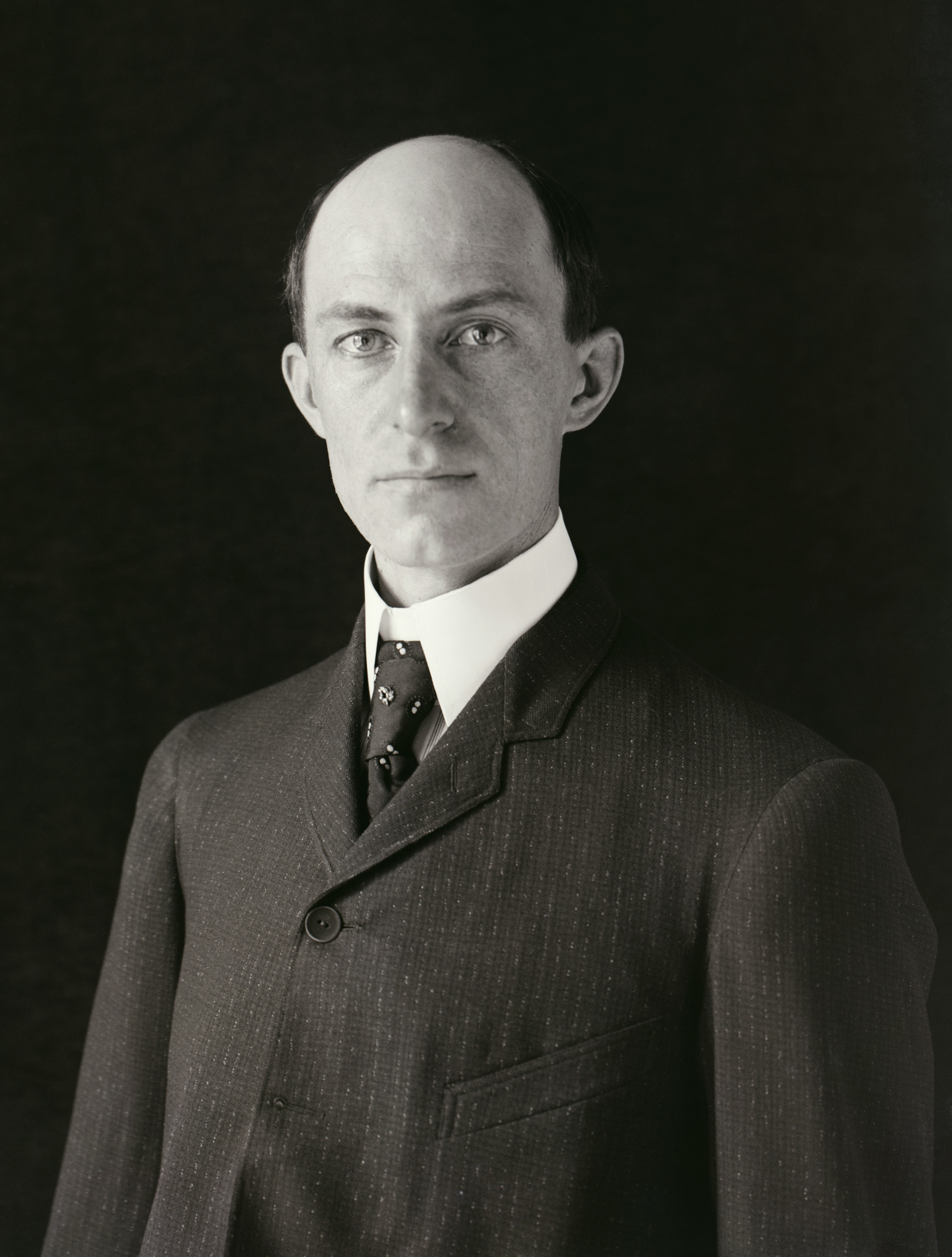
Wilbur Wright

- The first contingent of U.S. Marines landed at Daiquirí, Cuba.
- Wilbur Wright, 45, the older of the two Wright brothers who invented the airplane, died of typhoid fever at his home in Dayton, Ohio. Wilbur had become ill on May 4 while on a business trip to Boston. On December 17, 1903, Wilbur became the second man in history to pilot an airplane, after his brother Orville made the first flight.
- Royal Australian Navy light cruiser HMAS Melbourne was launched by Cammell Laird in Birkenhead, England.
- In the second running of the Indianapolis 500, Ralph DePalma was less than two laps away from victory when his Mercedes developed engine trouble on Lap 198. DePalma had led all the way, and was six laps ahead of the nearest competitor, Joe Dawson, who completed the race in 6 hours, 21 minutes and 6 seconds.
- Born:
  - Julius Axelrod, American chemist, recipient of the 1970 Nobel Prize in Physiology or Medicine for his research into the organic compound catecholamine; in New York City (d. 2004)
  - Hugh Griffith, Welsh actor, known for his film roles in Exodus, Mutiny on the Bounty, Tom Jones and Oliver!, recipient of the Academy Award for Best Supporting Actor for Ben-Hur; in Marian-glas, Anglesey (d. 1980)
  - Joseph Stein, American playwright, author of the musicals Fiddler on the Roof and Zorba; in New York City (d. 2010)

== May 31, 1912 (Friday) ==
- The Paddington Rifles infantry unit of the British Territorial Army was disbanded due to low recruitment.
- An experiment at Wichita Falls, Texas, to "make rain", after two weeks of drought, failed. Six thousand pounds of dynamite seemed to work at first, as cloudy skies and occasional flashes of lightning swept into the area, but without precipitation.
- John Hager's Doc's Dippy Duck made its debut in the Seattle Daily Times, appearing on the front page, although the cartoon was not formally named until 1915.
- Born:
  - Alfred Deller, English singer, credits for reviving the countertenor form of singing; in Margate, Kent (d. 1979)
  - Henry M. Jackson, U.S. Representative of Washington from 1941 to 1953 and U.S. Senator for Washington from 1953 to 1983; in Everett, Washington (d. 1983)
  - Chien-Shiung Wu, Chinese physicist, and member of the Manhattan Project, who conducted the ground-breaking 1956 experiment on nuclear physics; in Taicang, Jiangsu province (d. 1997)
