= Phil Gowan =

American RMS Titanic historian (1952–2018)

Phillip Gowan (October 17, 1952 – May 1, 2018) was an American RMS Titanic historian.

Born in Corsicana, Texas, on October 17, 1952, to Theodore Phillip "Ted" Gowan and Julia Thedia "Judy" Morris Gowan, he studied Spanish and business at Howard Payne University. He was interested in genealogy and travelling as a child, which he later demonstrated through his research on the Titanic. Despite his longtime interest in the Titanic, he had no relatives in the disaster.

His research focused more on passengers and crew, and the sinking itself, getting exclusive photographs and stories that he made public and interviewing several survivors, like Milvina Dean and the families of those who died. He's also known for his accurate calculation of the number of passengers on board, calculation that bears the name Gowan Numbers: 1,496 people died and 712 survived. He participated in several international congresses about the Titanic as a guest by Titanic Historical Society, was interviewed by National Geographic and television networks of several countries of the world; and published articles in newspapers. He died of cancer on May 1, 2018, at the age of 65, being recognized worldwide and eulogized by many as a renowned Titanic historian.
