= Coal Mines (Minimum Wage) Act 1912 =

Act of the Parliament of the United Kingdom

Coal Mines (Minimum Wage) Act 1912 (Note: Section 6(1).)
- Act of Parliament
- Parliament of the United Kingdom
- Long title: An Act to provide a Minimum Wage in the case of Workmen employed underground in Coal Mines (including Mines of Stratified Ironstone), and for purposes incidental thereto.
- Citation: 2 & 3 Geo. 5. c. 2
- Territorial extent: United Kingdom

Dates
- Royal assent: 29 March 1912
- Commencement: 29 March 1912 (Note: Section 6(2).)
- Expired: 29 March 1915
- Repealed: 23 May 1950
Other legislation
Repealed by	Statute Law Revision Act 1950

Status: Repealed

Text of statute as originally enacted

The Coal Mines (Minimum Wage) Act 1912 (2 & 3 Geo. 5. c. 2) was an act of the Parliament of the United Kingdom that gave minimum wage protection to coal miners. It was passed in response to strikes over pay which occurred in the same year.

== Subsequent developments ==
The whole act was repealed by section 1(1) of, and the first schedule to, the Statute Law Revision Act 1950 (14 Geo. 6. c. 6), which came into force on 23 May 1950.

== See also ==
- Liberal reforms
