= 1912 United Kingdom national coal strike =

General coal strike

National coal strike of 1912
- Part of Great Unrest
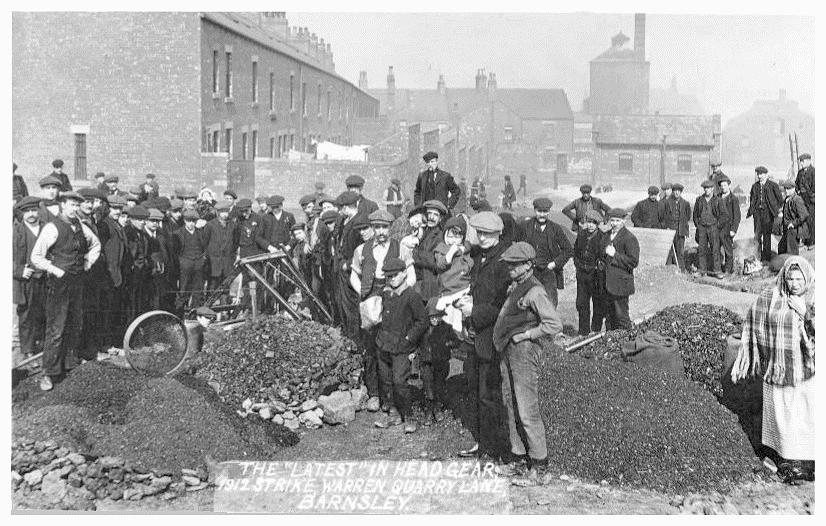
- Postcard of strike from 1912
- Date: 28 February – 6 April 1912
- Location: United Kingdom
- Goals: Mining minimum wage
- Result: Expansion of minimum wage to mining and other industries through the Coal Mines Act

Parties
MFGB; Coal miners	Coal companies

Number
~1,000,000	

The first national strike by coal miners in the United Kingdom took place in 1912. Its main goal was securing a minimum wage. After 37 days, the government intervened and ended the strike by passing the Coal Mines Act, extending minimum wage provisions to the mining industry and certain other industries with many manual jobs.

The dispute centred upon an attempt by the Miners Federation of Great Britain, the main trade union representing coal miners, to secure a minimum wage for miners in their district and replace the complicated wage structure then in place which often made it difficult for a miner to earn a fair day's wage. The same issues had caused a major dispute the previous year in South Wales and had become a national issue. The strike was a repeat of the unsuccessful strike of 1894 which also sought a minimum wage.

The strike began at the end of February in Alfreton, Derbyshire and spread nationwide. Nearly one million miners took part. It ended on 6 April after 37 days. The strike caused considerable disruption to train and shipping schedules. Probably the biggest (and most famous example of this) was the cancellation of several departures programmed for White Star Line vessels, whose passengers had to be transferred to the new Titanic, which sailed on April 10th (with coal laregly borrowed from other ships due the shortage caused by the strike) and would end up sinking on April 15th with great loss of life, many of which were passengers who had to be transferred from the ships whose crossings had to be cancelled due the lack of coal.

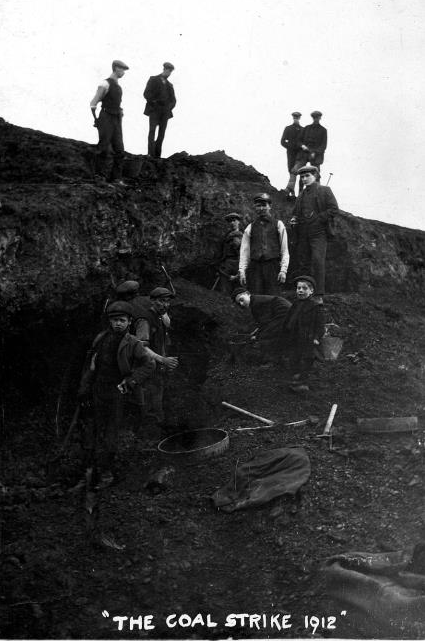
People picking coal to heat their homes

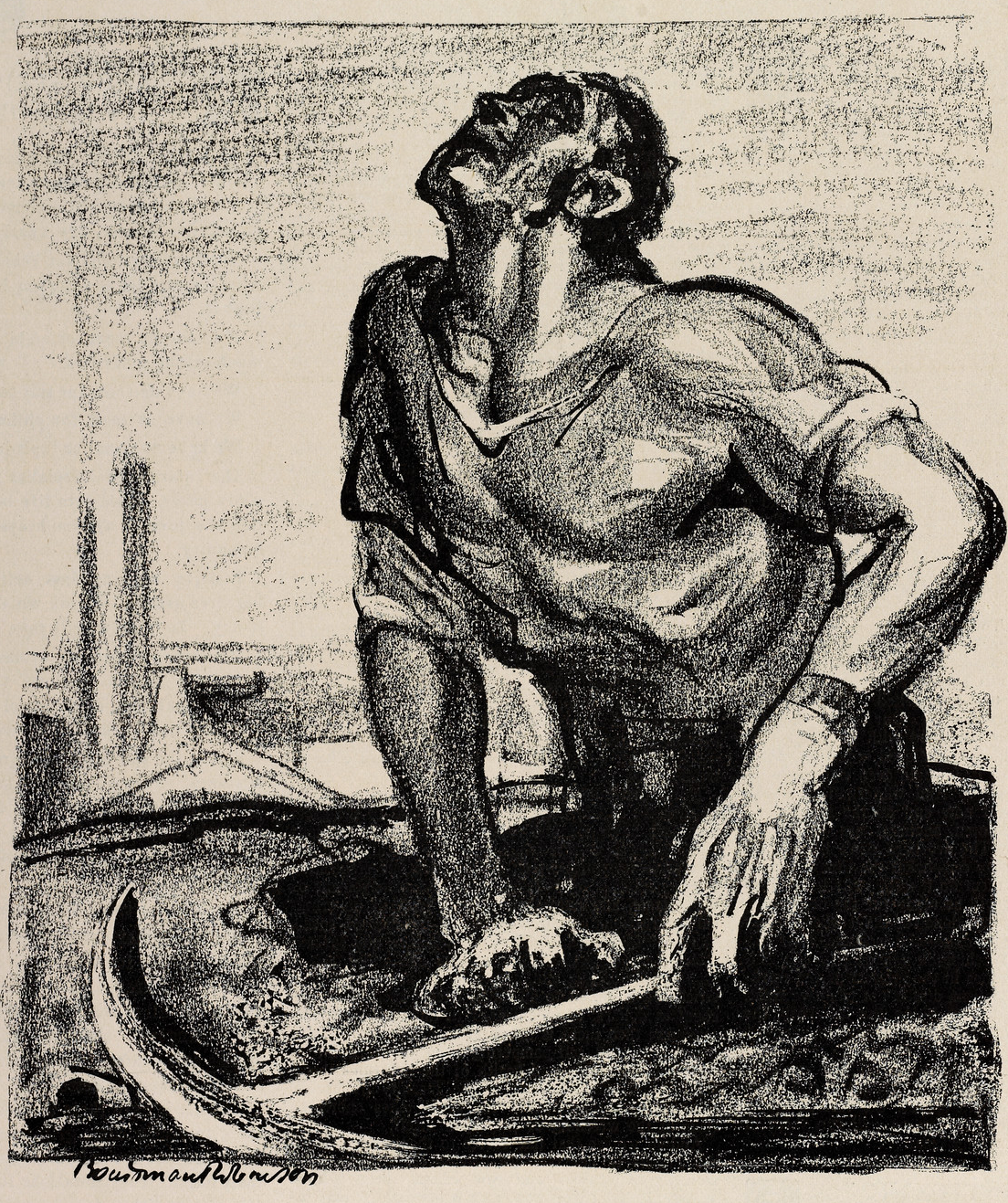
A sketch by Boardman Robinson depicting a miner emerging out of the earth with a pick axe and head seeking the light up. (in reference to coal strikes of 1912 in the US and UK)

== See also ==
- West Virginia coal wars & strikes (1912–1921)
- 1926 United Kingdom general strike
