= Gelber =

Gelber is a surname. Notable people with the surname include:

- Alexis Gelber, Goldsmith Fellow at the John F. Kennedy School of Government
- Arthur Gelber (1915–1998), Canadian philanthropist
- Beatrice Gelber, American psychologist
- Bruno Leonardo Gelber (born 1941), Argentine classical pianist
- Dan Gelber (born 1960), former prosecutor, member of the Florida Senate
- Dan Gelber (game designer), co-creator of the Paranoia role-playing game
- Jack Gelber (1932–2003), American playwright known for his 1959 drama The Connection
- Jordan Gelber (born 1975), American actor
- Lady Henrietta Gelber (born 1958), English interior decorator and founder of Woodstock Designs
- Lee Gelber (1938–2020), American tour guide and urban historian
- Lionel Gelber, Canadian diplomat who founded the Lionel Gelber Prize in 1989
- Mark H. Gelber (born 1951), American-Israeli scholar of German-Jewish literature and culture
- Marvin Gelber (1912–1990), Liberal party member of the Canadian House of Commons
- Moscovici Gelber (1895–1938), Romanian socialist and communist activist
- Nathan Michael Gelber (1891–1966), Austrian-Israeli historian
- Wylie Gelber (born 1988), American bassist and guitar maker, founding member of the band Dawes
- Yoav Gelber (born 1943), professor of history at the University of Haifa

== See also ==
- Gelber Berg, mountain of Bavaria, Germany
- "Gelber Stern" or "Judenstern" (German), Yellow badge
- Gelber Stern (Hildesheim), historic street in Hildesheim, a city in Lower Saxony in Germany
- Geber (disambiguation)
- Gelb (disambiguation)
