= Gelbe Burg =

- Gelbe Bürg
- Dittenheim, Heidenheim
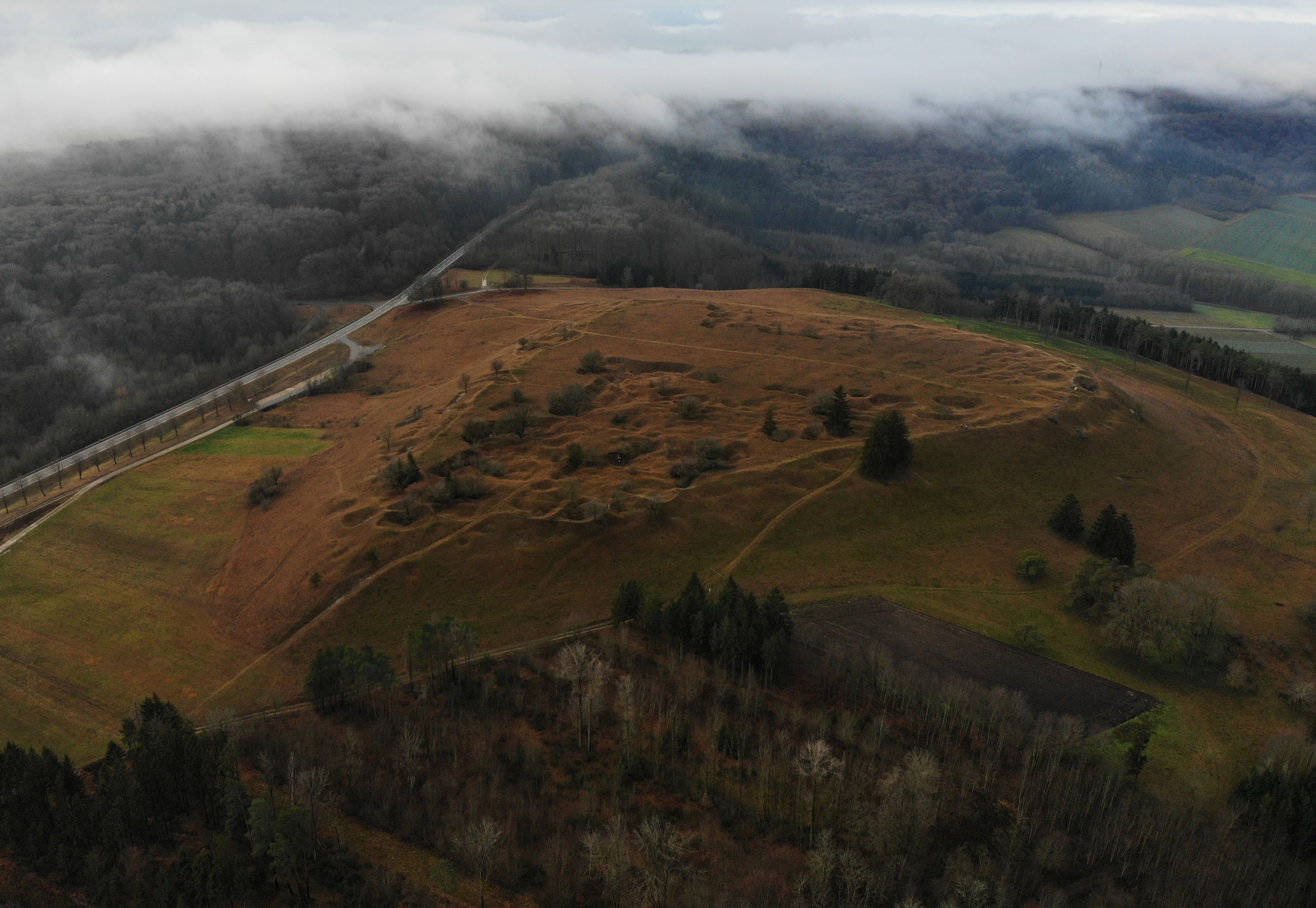
- Aerial view from the south (2019)

Site information
- Type: hill castle
- Code: DE-BY
- Condition: Burgstall, neck ditch, a few wall remains

Location
- Coordinates: 49°02′21″N 10°45′54″E
- Height: 628.4 m above sea level (NN)

Site history
- Built: before 1180

Garrison information
- Occupants: ministeriales

The Gelbe Burg ("Yellow Castle"), also called the Gelbe Bürg, is the site of a hill castle on the Gelber Berg ("Yellow Mountain", 628.4 m above sea level (NN)) northeast of the market village of Heidenheim in the Middle Franconian county of Weißenburg-Gunzenhausen in the German state of Bavaria.

Archaeological remains indicate the site was occupied in the late Bronze Age Urnfield period.

During the Migration Period there was a hilltop settlement on the Gelber Berg. Hardly anything is known of the founding of the medieval castle and the course of its history. Around 1180 the castle was owned by the bishops of Eichstätt: in a document the Eichstätt ministerialis, Chono de Woluesprunnen, was appointed to a district office (Amt) there.

On the eastern side of the mountain there are still clear traces of a long abandoned early medieval fortification of the circular rampart type. A neck ditch and collapsed wall remains are still visible on the castle site. In 1448 this ruin is mentioned in the stock book (Lagerbuch) at Heidenheim Abbey.

== Literature ==
- Konrad Spindler (revisor): Führer zu archäologischen Denkmälern in Deutschland, Band 14: Landkreis Weißenburg-Gunzenhausen - Archäologie und Geschichte. Konrad Theiss Verlag, Stuttgart, 1987, ISBN 3-8062-0493-4, pp. 168–175.
