= Mark Whitaker (journalist) =

American writer

Mark Whitaker (born September 7, 1957) is an American author, journalist and media executive.

He was editor of Newsweek from 1998 until 2006, the first African-American to lead a national news magazine. From 2004 to 2006, Whitaker served as president of the American Society of Magazine Editors. He was senior vice president and Washington bureau chief for NBC News. From 2011 to 2013, he was executive vice president and managing editor of CNN Worldwide.

Whitaker has written the books My Long Trip Home (2011), a family memoir; Cosby: His Life and Times (2014), a biography of Bill Cosby; Smoketown: The Untold Story of the Other Great Black Renaissance (2018), about the legacy of the African-American community of Pittsburgh; Saying It Loud: 1966 – The Year Black Power Challenged the Civil Rights Movement (2023); and The Afterlife of Malcolm X: An Outcast Turned Icon's Enduring Impact on America (2025) about the impact of Malcolm X.

He was named one of Essence magazine's 25 most influential African-Americans for 2008.

Whitaker is on the board of jurors for the Peabody Awards.

== Life and work ==
=== Early life and education ===
Whitaker was born outside of Philadelphia, Pennsylvania. He graduated summa cum laude with a degree in social studies from Harvard College in 1979, where he served on the editorial board of The Harvard Crimson. He then studied international relations at Oxford University's Balliol College from 1979 until 1981 where he was a Marshall Scholar.

=== Journalism ===
He was an editor of Newsweek, the first African-American to lead a national news magazine. While he ran the magazine, from 1998 until 2006, it won four National Magazine Awards—for coverage of 9/11, the Iraq War, the Monica Lewinsky scandal and the 2004 elections.

From 2004 to 2006, Whitaker served as president of the American Society of Magazine Editors.

Whitaker was senior vice president and Washington bureau chief for NBC News, succeeding Tim Russert after his fatal heart attack in June 2008. In that role, he oversaw all Washington-based reporting and production for NBC and MSNBC during the 2008 election and early years of the Obama presidency, in addition to appearing as an on-air analyst. Before moving to Washington, he served as chief deputy to the president of NBC News in New York.

From 2011 to 2013, he was executive vice president and managing editor of CNN Worldwide, where he oversaw daily news coverage, launched CNN Films, and persuaded the network to hire food and travel writer Anthony Bourdain to create the program Anthony Bourdain: Parts Unknown. After Bourdain's suicide in 2018, Whitaker praised the chef's coverage of under-reported countries such as Lebanon and said, "It's not a food show; it's journalism."

Whitaker is a contributing correspondent for CBS Sunday Morning and a juror for the Peabody Awards.

=== Books ===
External videos
- Presentation by Whitaker on My Long Trip Home, November 3, 2011, C-SPAN
- Presentation by Whitaker on Cosby: His Life and Times, September 29, 2014, C-SPAN
- Presentation by Whitaker on Saying It Loud, February 26, 2023, C-SPAN
- Discussion with Whitaker on Saying It Loud, April 22, 2023, C-SPAN
- Q&A interview with Whitaker on The Afterlife of Malcolm X, June 15, 2025, C-SPAN

In 2011, Whitaker published a family memoir, My Long Trip Home, about his turbulent upbringing as the child of an interracial marriage between a pioneering but self-destructive Black scholar of Africa and a White French immigrant whose father, Edouard Theis, was a clergyman who helped save the lives of Jews during World War II in the French town of Le Chambon-sur-Lignon. The book won critical praise and was a finalist for the Los Angeles Times Book Prize and the Hurston/Wright Legacy Award.

In 2014, Whitaker published a biography of Bill Cosby, Cosby: His Life and Times. CBS News reported that "some critics praised it" upon release. Neil Drumming called it "wonderfully thorough" in The New York Times, and Kirkus Reviews wrote that it is "an eye-opening book and a pleasure to read". It made several New York Times bestseller lists and Amazon.com included it in two "best" lists. It sold about 6,000 copies. After the book was released and dozens of women came forward accusing Cosby of sexual assault, it was "widely criticized for idealizing Cosby", according to CBS. While dealing with Cosby's history of infidelity and a paternity extortion trial, Whitaker's biography did not explore the assault claims that pre-dated his book. When multiple similar allegations came to light after publication, Whitaker issued an apology. The book was not released in paperback.

In 2018, Whitaker published Smoketown: The Untold Story of the Other Great Black Renaissance, about the legacy of the African-American community of Pittsburgh, where his father grew up and his grandparents owned funeral homes. The book links stories of prominent artists who grew up in Pittsburgh—including musicians Ahmad Jamal, Billy Strayhorn, Billy Eckstine, Earl Hines, Mary Lou Williams, Roy Eldridge, Kenny Clarke, Ray Brown, Erroll Garner; artist Romare Bearden; and playwright August Wilson—influential journalists for the black newspaper The Pittsburgh Courier—including Robert Lee Vann, Wendell Smith and Evelyn Cunningham—and historic figures whose careers were shaped by their interaction with Pittsburgh—including Joe Louis, Jackie Robinson, Duke Ellington and Lena Horne. Both scholars of black history and experts on Pittsburgh's local history praised the book as an important contribution to the study of African-American achievement and struggle in the mid-20th century.

In 2023 Whitaker published Saying It Loud: 1966—The Year Black Power Challenged the Civil Rights Movement. The book chronicled the sequence of events that changed the course of American racial and political history in that one pivotal year, including the rise of Stokely Carmichael to the head of the Student Nonviolent Coordinating Committee and Carmichael's popularizing of the slogan "Black Power"; the founding of the Black Panther Party by Huey P. Newton and Bobby Seale; the celebration of the first Kwanzaa by cultural nationalist Maulana Karenga; and the "White backlash" vote in the 1966 midterm elections that helped elect Ronald Reagan as Governor of California and set the stage for the presidential runs of Richard Nixon and George Wallace in 1968. Saying It Loud was named one of the Washington Post's 50 best nonfiction books of 2023.

The Afterlife of Malcolm X: An Outcast Turned Icon's Enduring Impact on America was released in early 2025. In that book, Whitaker examined the impact of civil rights leader Malcolm X.

=== Awards ===
Whitaker was named one of Essence magazine's 25 most influential African-Americans for 2008. He also has an honorary degree from Wheaton College (Massachusetts), where he gave the commencement speech in 1999 and where his mother taught French literature for three decades.

=== Personal life ===
Whitaker is married to Alexis Gelber, a former long-time editor at Newsweek.
