= Lappenberg =

Lappenberg may refer to:

- Lappenberg (Hildesheim)
- Johann Martin Lappenberg
