= Gelb =

Gelb may refer to:

- Gelb (album), by Neuroticfish
- Gelb (surname), people with the surname Gelb
- Gelb, a squadron in Ace Combat Zero: The Belkan War
