= Gelb (surname) =

Gelb is a German surname meaning "yellow" and a nickname for man with red hair in Yiddish. People with the surname Gelb or Gelbs include:

- Anne Gelb, American mathematician
- Arthur Gelb, managing editor of The New York Times
- Bruce Gelb, American businessman and diplomat
- Howe Gelb, American musician
- Ignace Gelb (1907–1985), Polish American ancient historian
- Jan Gelb (1906–1978), American artist
- Jerry Gelb, actor, voice actor and voice casting professional
- Lawrence M. Gelb (1898–1980), American chemist
- Leslie H. Gelb (1937-2019), American correspondent
- Michael H. Gelb, American biochemist
- Michael J. Gelb, writer and trainer, specialising in personal development and corporate training seminars
- Peter Gelb (born 1953), American arts administrator
- Richard L. Gelb (1924–2004), American businessman
- Steve Gelbs (born 1987), American sports reporter
