= Lappenberg (Hildesheim) =

Lappenberg (German pronunciation: [ˈlapn̩ˌbɛʁk]) is a historic street in Hildesheim, a city in Lower Saxony in Germany. It was the center of the Jewish community.

== Location ==
Lappenberg is a street with a triangular place. It is in the South of the district Neustadt between Wollenweberstrasse, another historic street, and Neues Tor, a medieval city gate. Kehrwiederwall, a part of the rampart system which was built around Hildesheim in the Middle Ages, is in the South of Lappenberg. The famous tower Kehrwiederturm, one of the most important sights of Hildesheim, is behind Lappenberg in the small lane Am Kehrwieder. Gelber Stern, another historic street with interesting buildings, is close by.

== History ==
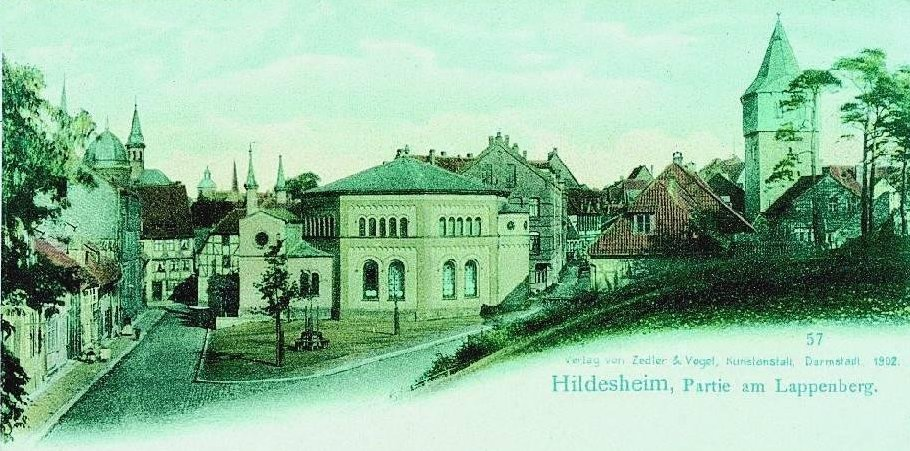
Hildesheim's synagogue

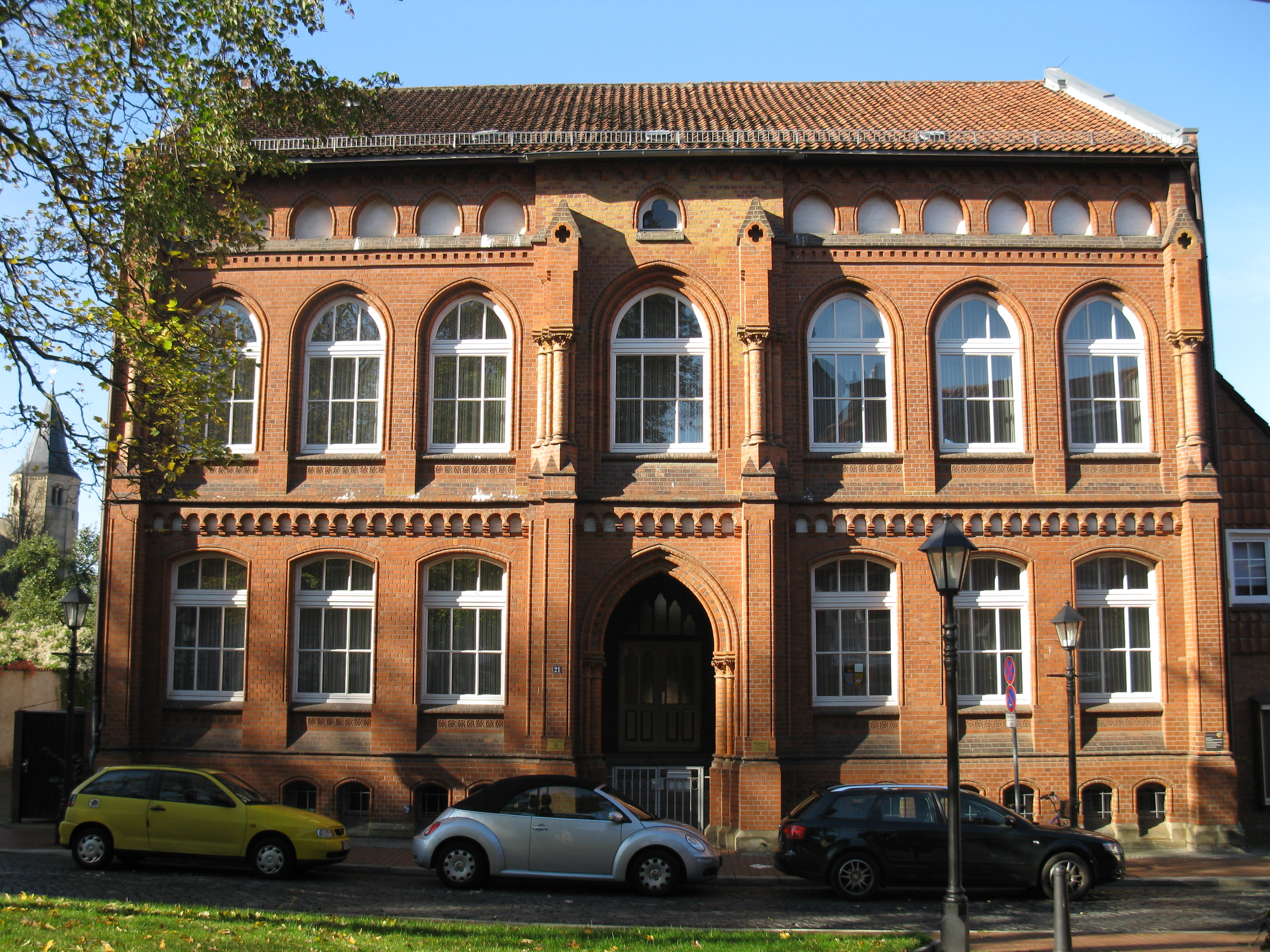
Former Jewish school

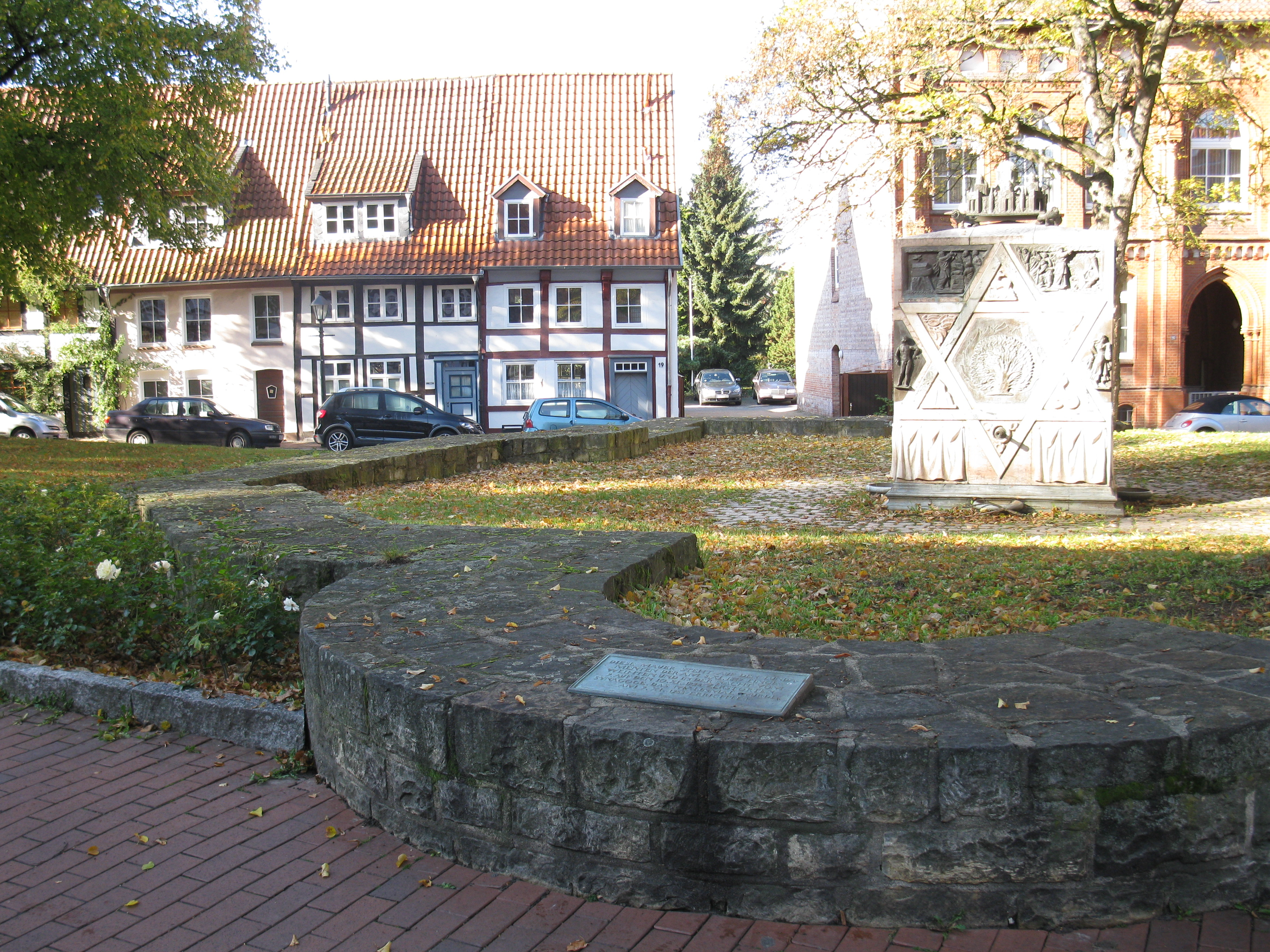
Foundations of the synagogue with the apsis in the foreground

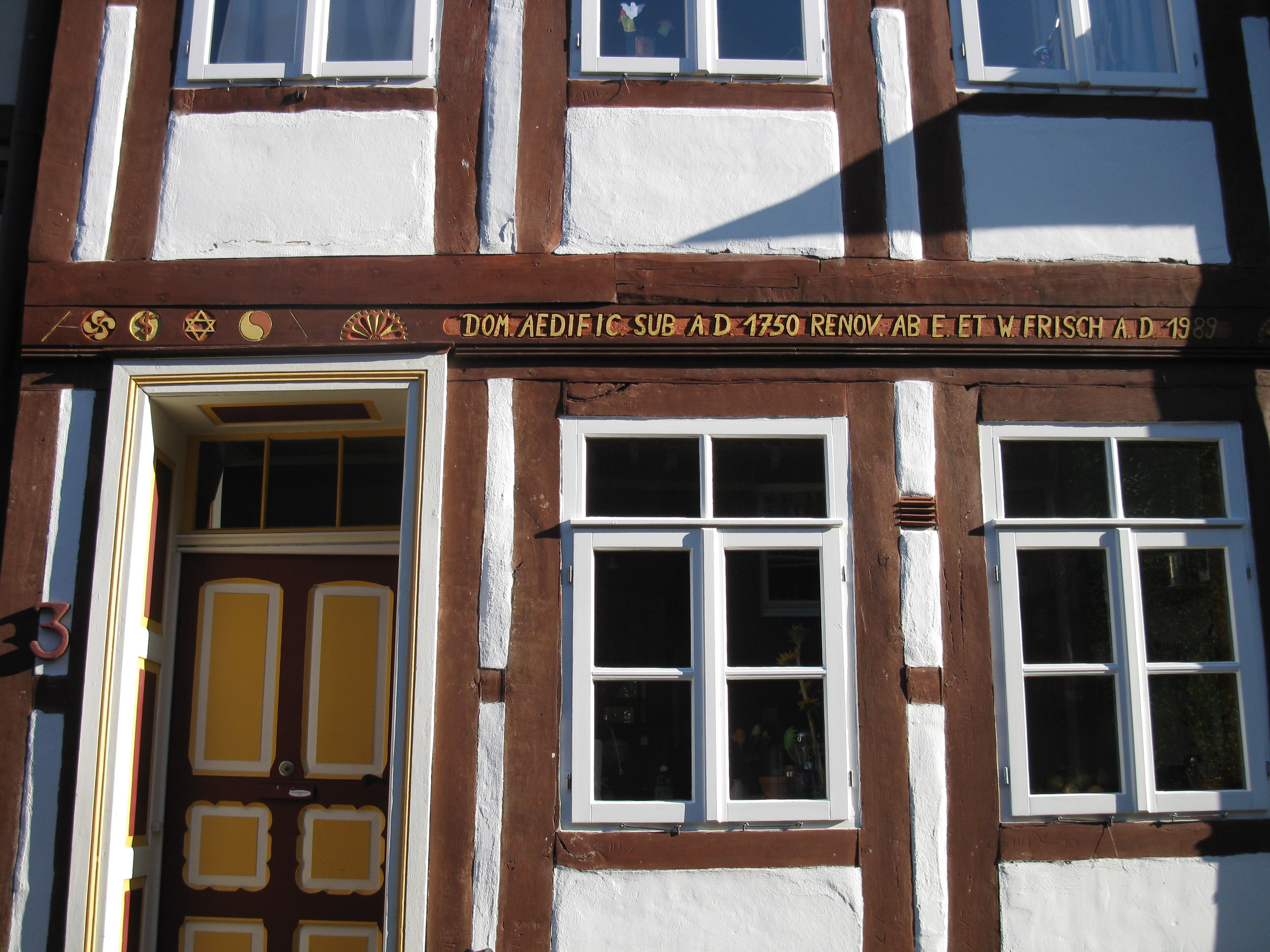
House no. 3 with a Star of David above the entrance

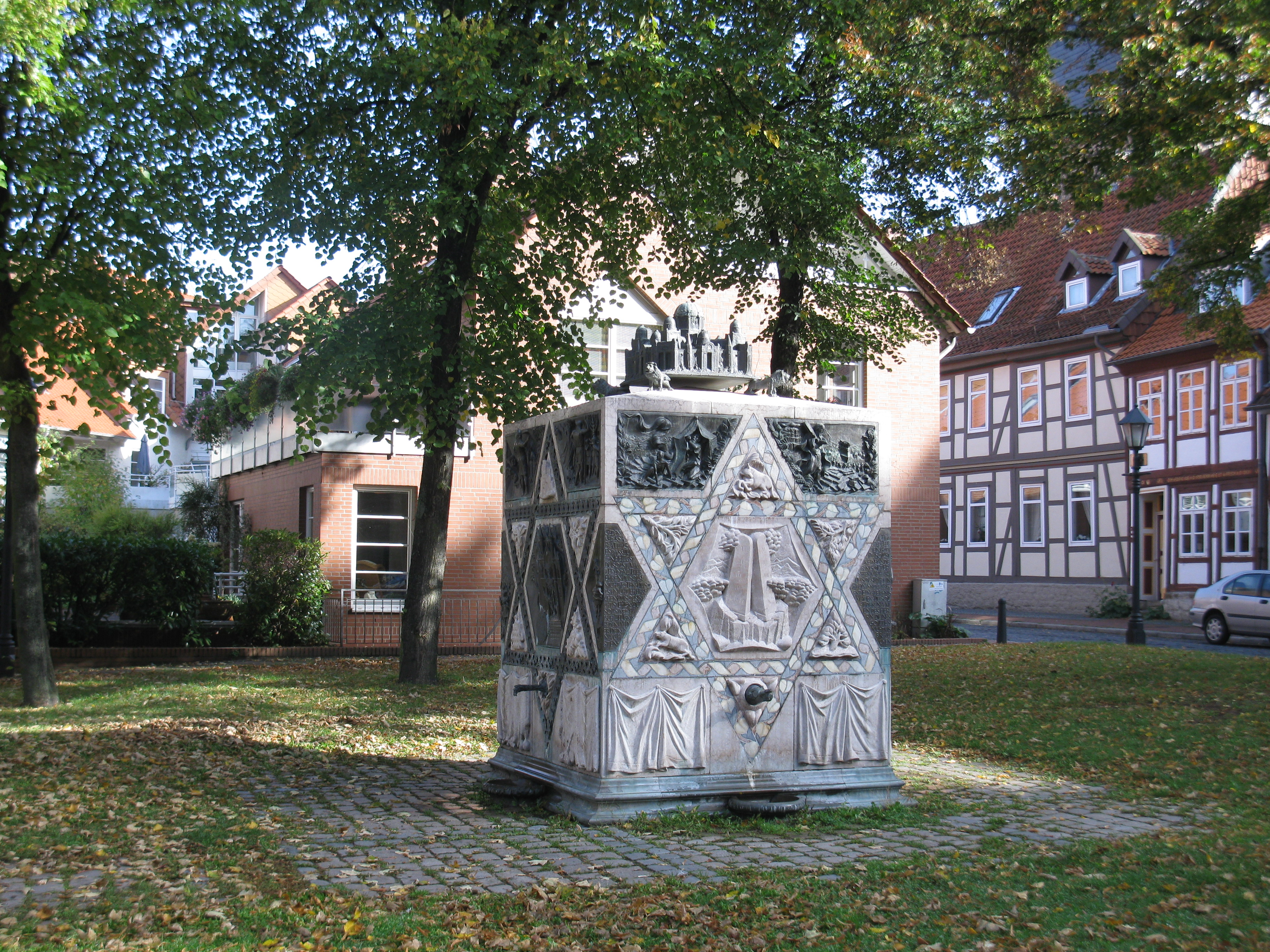
Monument of the synagogue

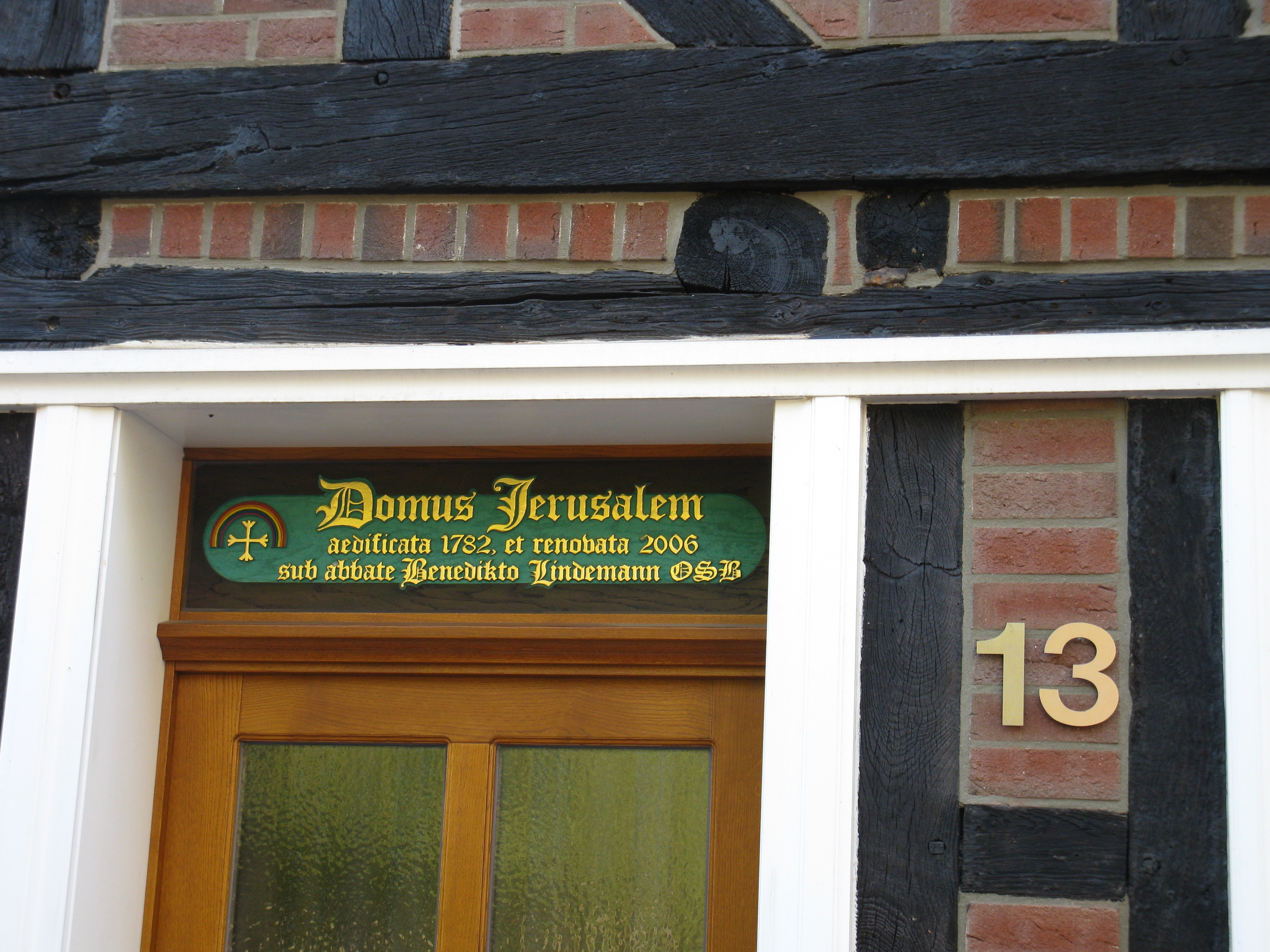
Jerusalem House

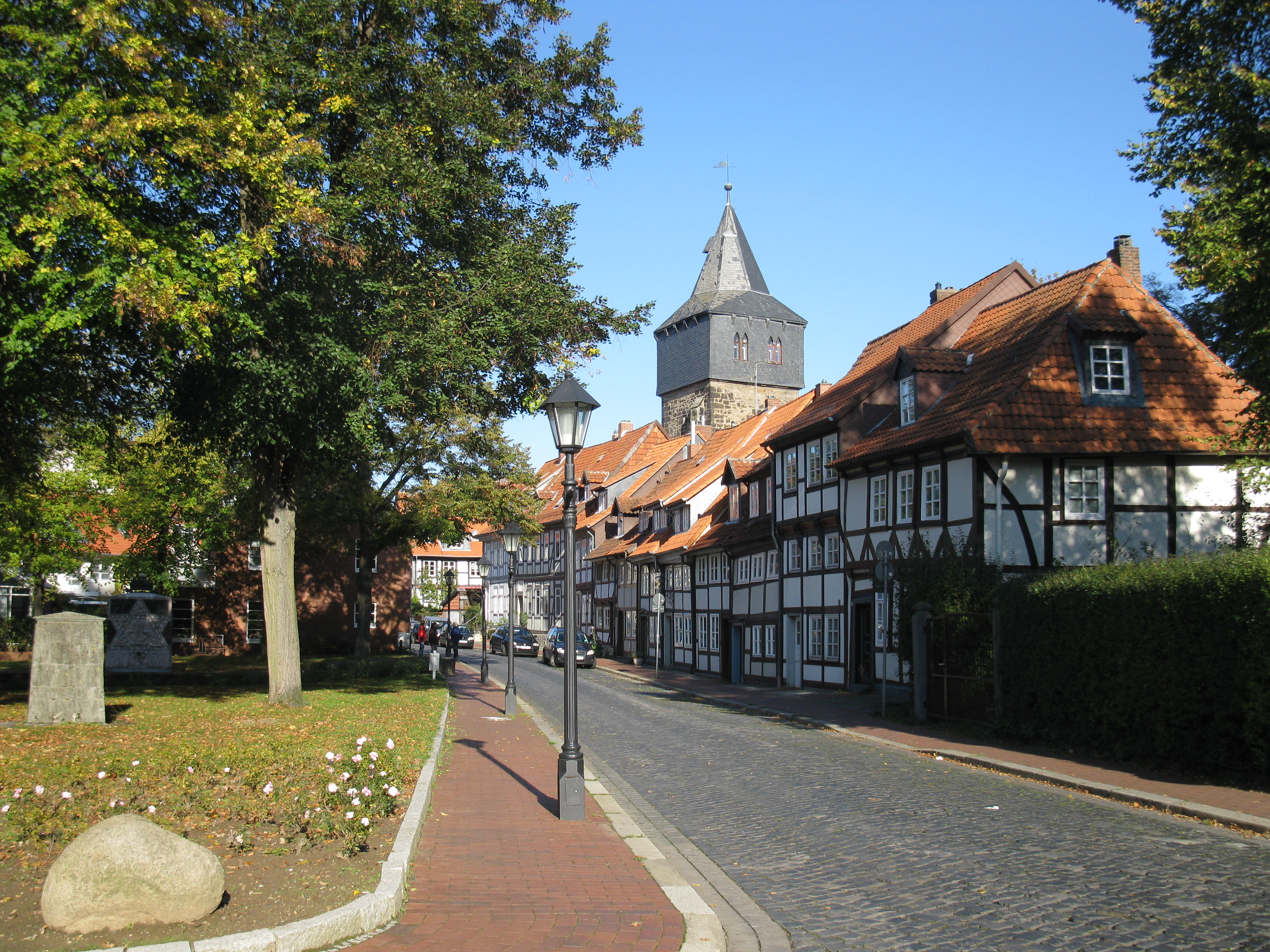
Partial view of Lappenberg with Kehrwiederturm tower

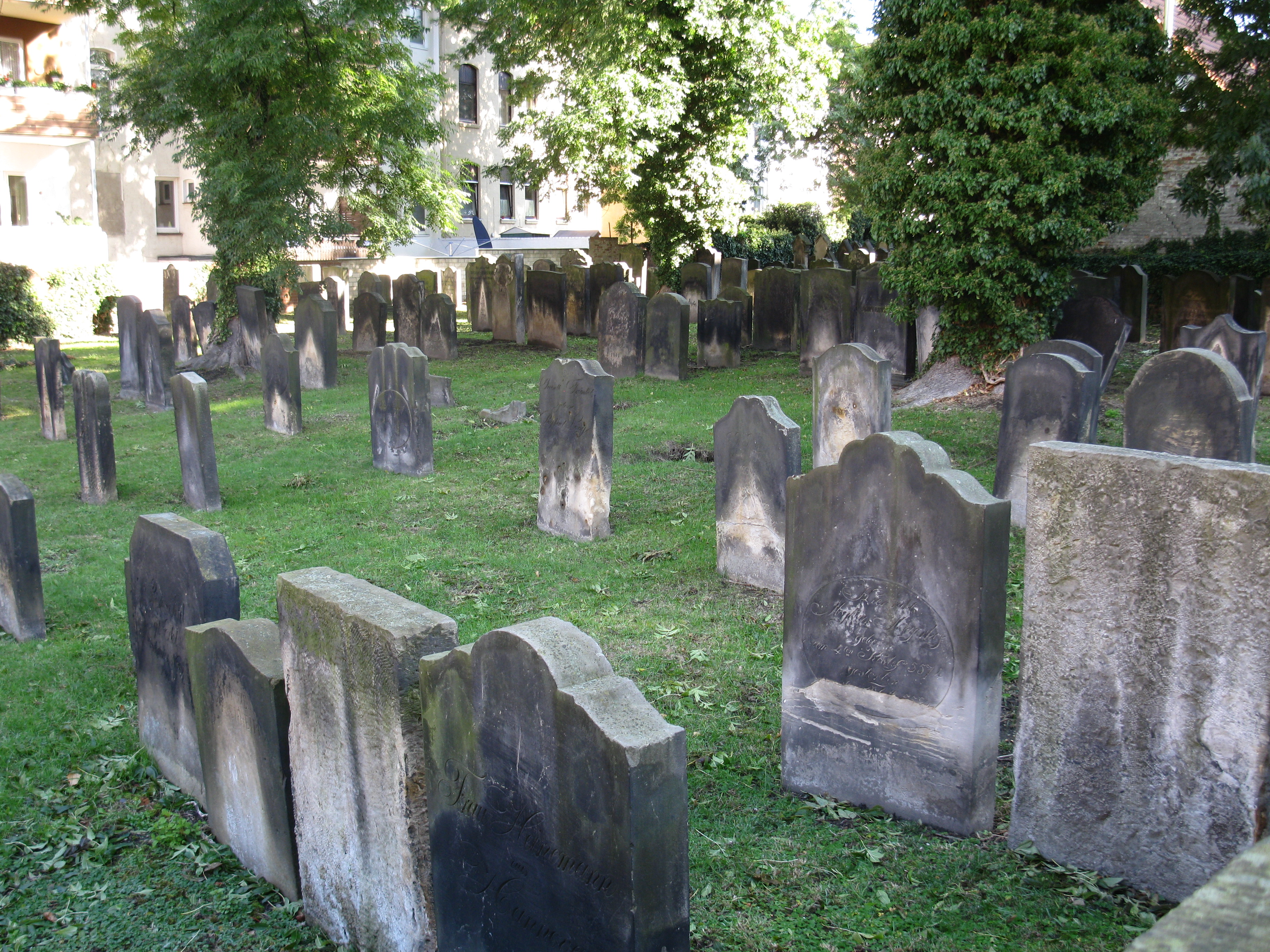
Jewish cemetery in Hildesheim

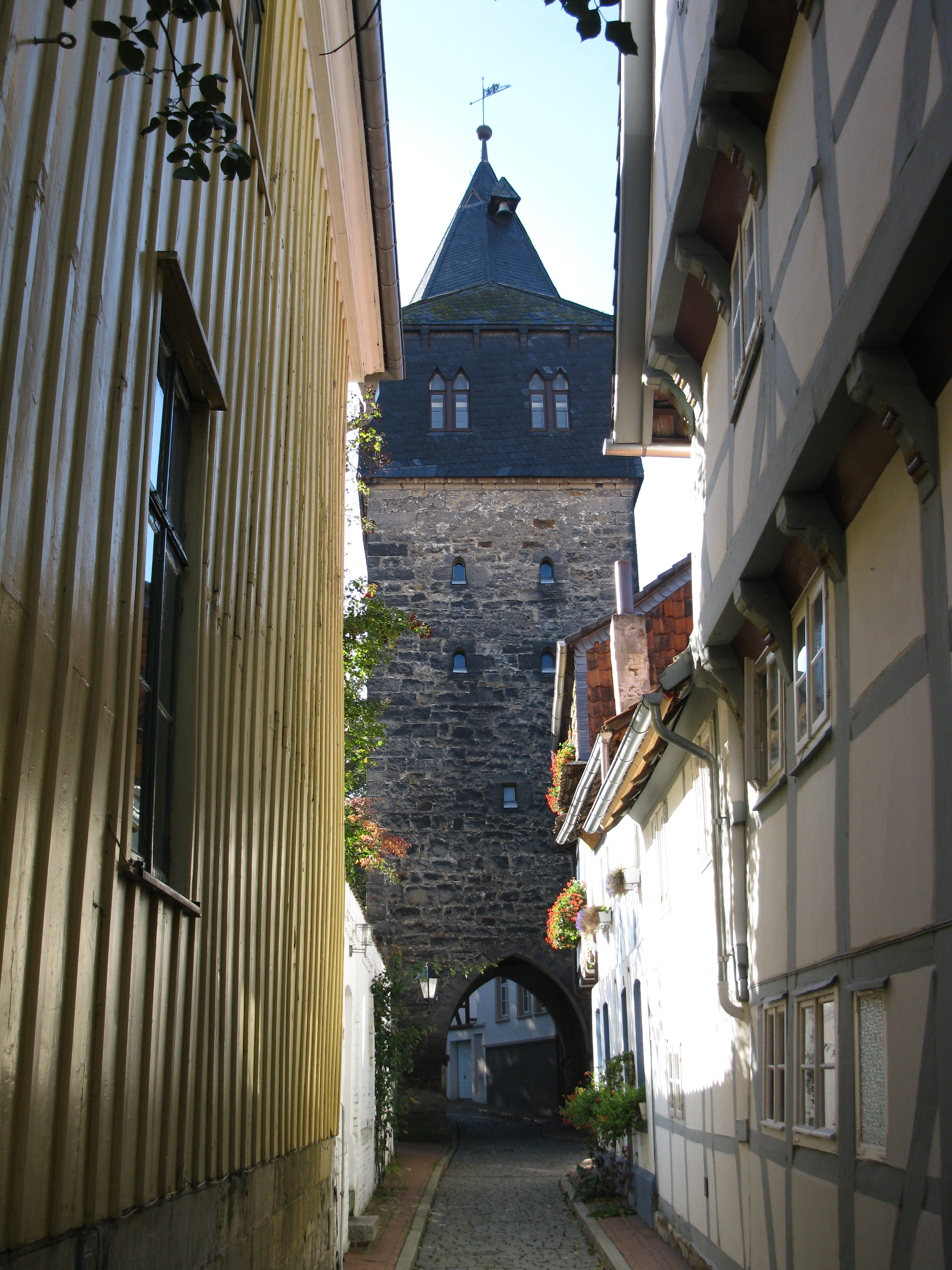
Am Kehrwieder lane in the Jewish community

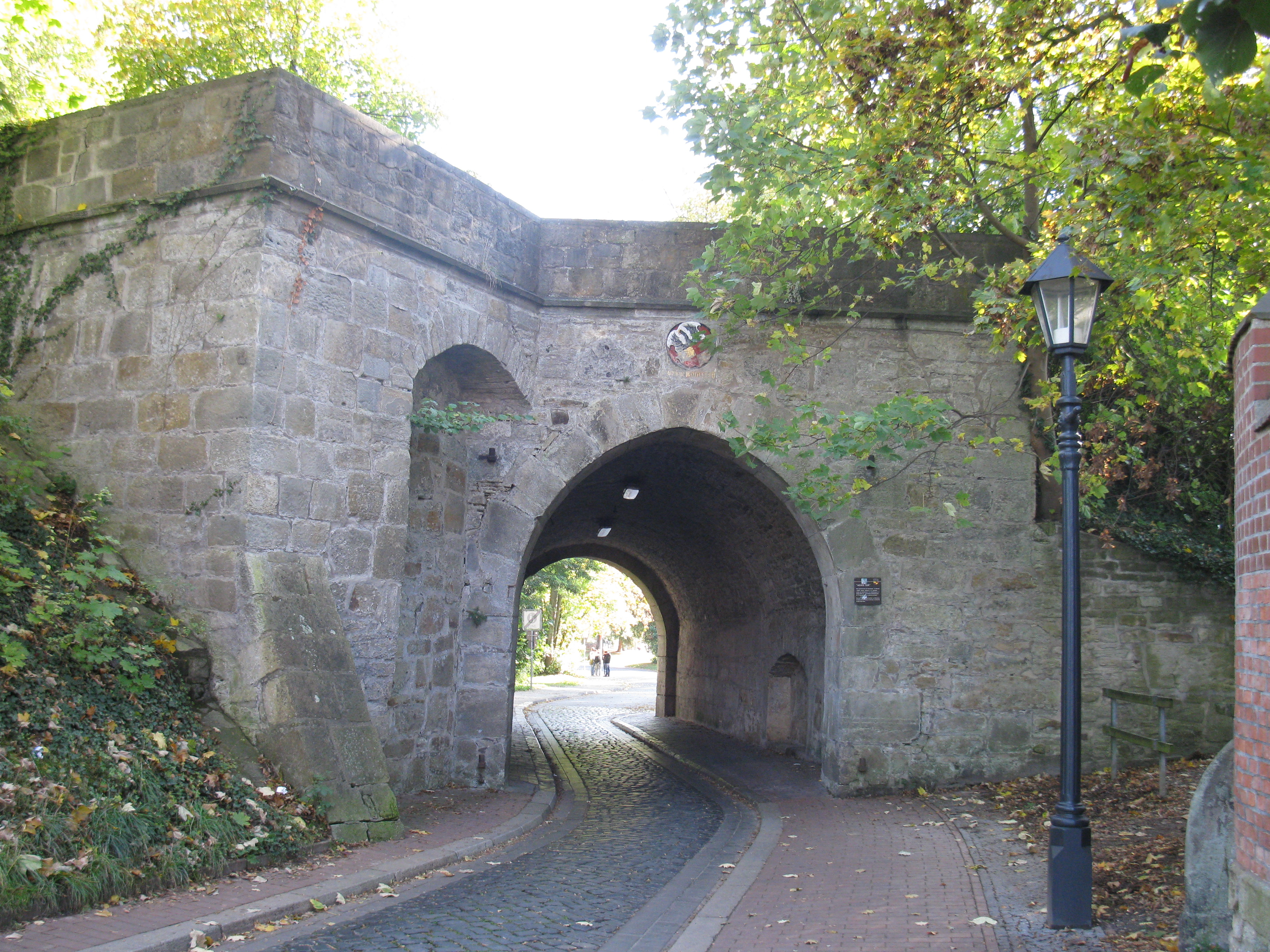
Medieval gate Neues Tor

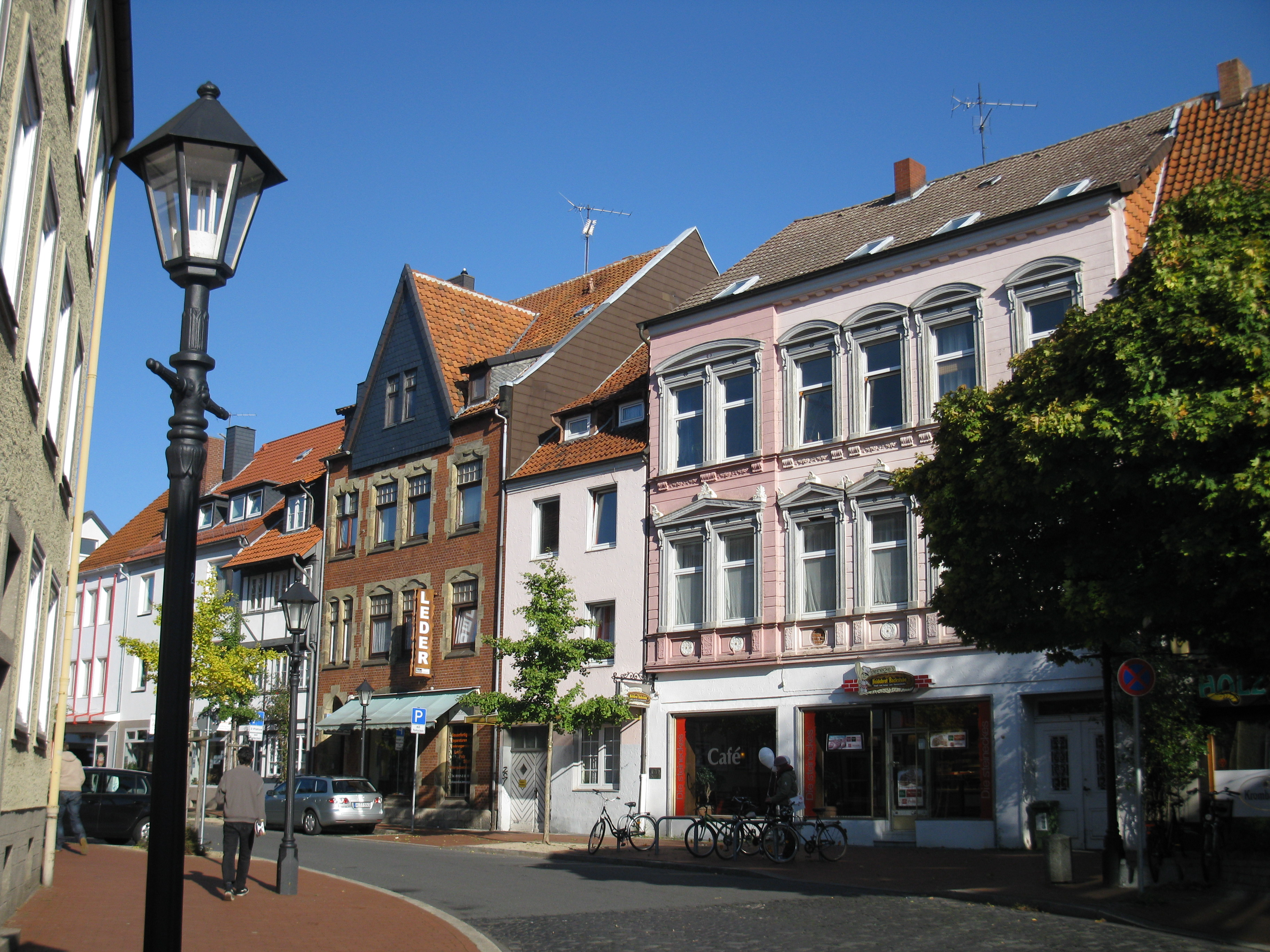
Historic street Wollenweberstrasse in the Jewish community

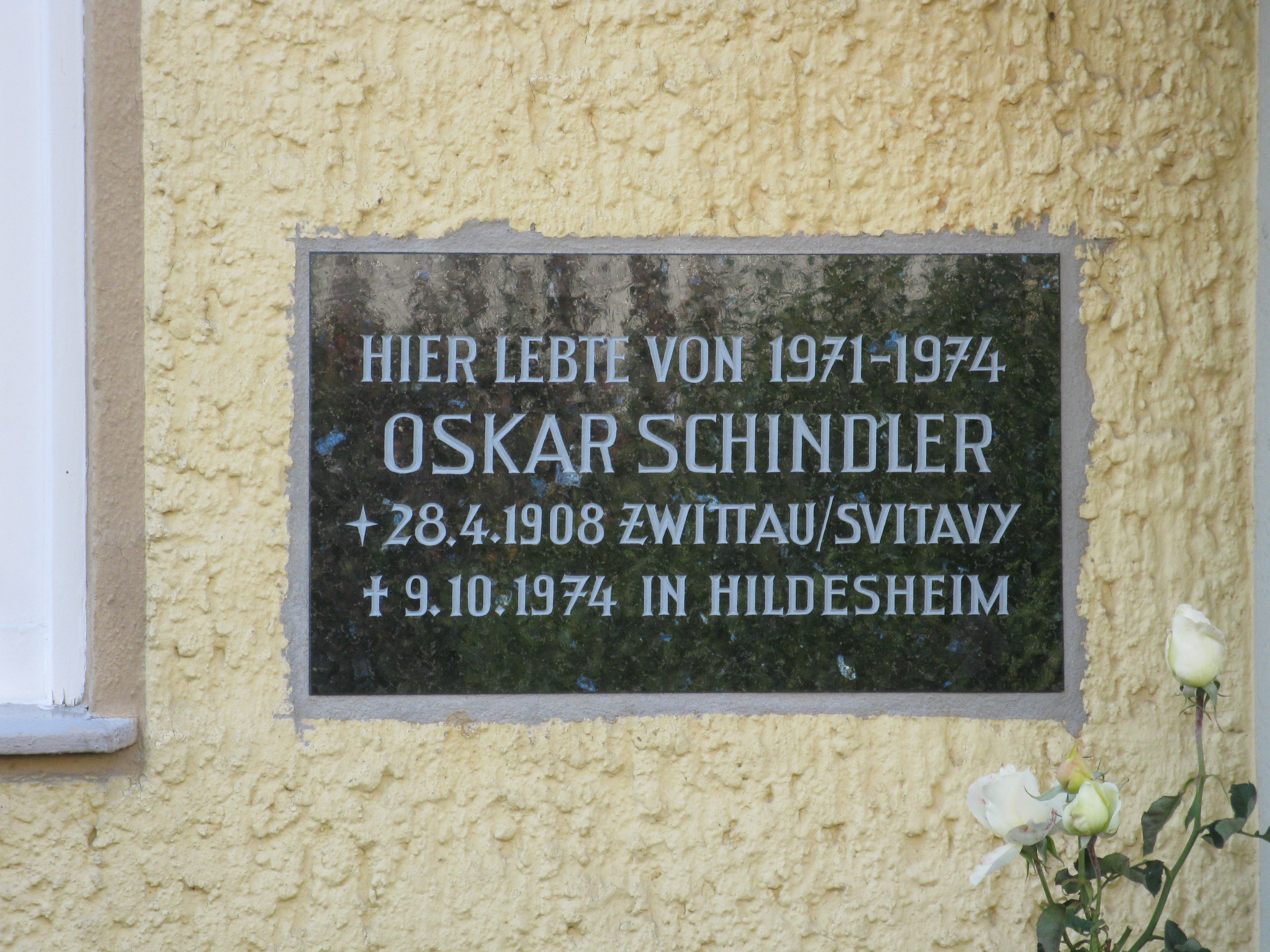
Commemorative plaque at no. 30, Goettingstrasse

Jews have lived in Hildesheim from the beginning of the 16th century approximately, and in 1536, the street Lappenberg was mentioned as a residence of Jews for the first time. The street developed into the center of the Jewish community. In 1803 Hildesheim had 11,108 habitantes of whom 377 were Jews.

The synagogue of Hildesheim was built in Lappenberg in 1849 by E. F. Schwartz, an architect from Hanover, and in 1881 a Jewish school was inaugurated opposite. Most of the Jews of Hildesheim lived in the streets and lanes around Lappenberg. In 1933, Hildesheim had 62,519 inhabitants of whom 515 (0,8%) were Jews. The synagogue was destroyed on 9 November 1938.

In the Second World War, Lappenberg and the streets and lanes around received comparatively little damage. A part of house no. 12 was damaged during an air raid on 22 February 1945, and house no. 16 was destroyed on 22 March 1945, but it was rebuilt in the original style after the war. Some houses were damaged the same day.

The monument of the synagogue was built in 1988 at the very place where the synagogue had stood before 1938.

Today Lappenberg is one of the most important sights of Hildesheim.

== Sights and Architecture ==
- The monument of the synagogue consisting of a cube with a Star of David was built in Lappenberg in 1988. The foundations were reconstructed and give an impression of the size and the shape of the octagonal building which had two towers. The entrance was in the West and the apsis was in the East. The necessary information is given on a commemorative plaque.
- The former Jewish school (building no. 21) was inaugurated in 1881. It was built of tiles in a neogothic style. The Jewish school, which was a public primary school, had 31 pupils in 1932 and 10 in 1939. After the destruction of the synagogue in 1938, the school became the most important building in the Jewish community. In 1942 it was closed and converted into an orphanage.
- Lappenberg consists of well-preserved half-timbered houses most of which were built in the 16th and 17th century. Some of them have noteworthy wood carvings in their facades. There is a Star of David above the entrance of houses no. 3 which was built in 1750 and renovated in 1989. In some cases, the year of construction is indicated in the facade, e.g. house no. 11 was built in 1691. Many houses have old and colourful wooden doors.
- House no. 13 is called Domus Jerusalem (Jerusalem House). It was built in 1782 and renovated in 2006.
- An old Jewish cemetery can be seen in Teichstrasse street in Oststadt, a residential area about one kilometer from Lappenberg. The cemetery was founded at the beginning of the 17th century. It was closed in 1892 when another Jewish cemetery was opened in the North of Hildesheim. There is a third Jewish cemetery in Bennostrasse street in Moritzberg, a district of Hildesheim which was an independent town until 1911. This cemetery was used from 1800 to 1849, and 29 well-preserved graves can still be seen there.
- Kehrwiederturm Tower, with a height of 30 meters, was built in the 14th century and is one of the most famous sights of Hildesheim. The tower is behind Lappenberg in the picturesque lane Am Kehrwieder.
- Neues Tor, an old city gate which was built in the 14th century, is a part of the medieval rampart Kehrwiederwall in the South of Lappenberg. In the North Wollenweberstrasse, another historic street, is worth a visit.

== Additional information ==
Oskar Schindler lived in Hildesheim from 1971 until his death in 1974. He died in the hospital Sankt-Bernward Krankenhaus. Schindler lived in the street Goettingstrasse in Weststadt, a residential area in the West of Hildesheim. A commemorative plaque can be seen at the house no. 30 where he lived.

The new synagogue of Hildesheim was inaugurated on 10 November 2009 in a building provided free by the Catholic Church. In 2009, the Jewish community had 35 members.
