= Moritzberg (Hildesheim) =

Coordinates: 52°09′02″N 9°55′02″E

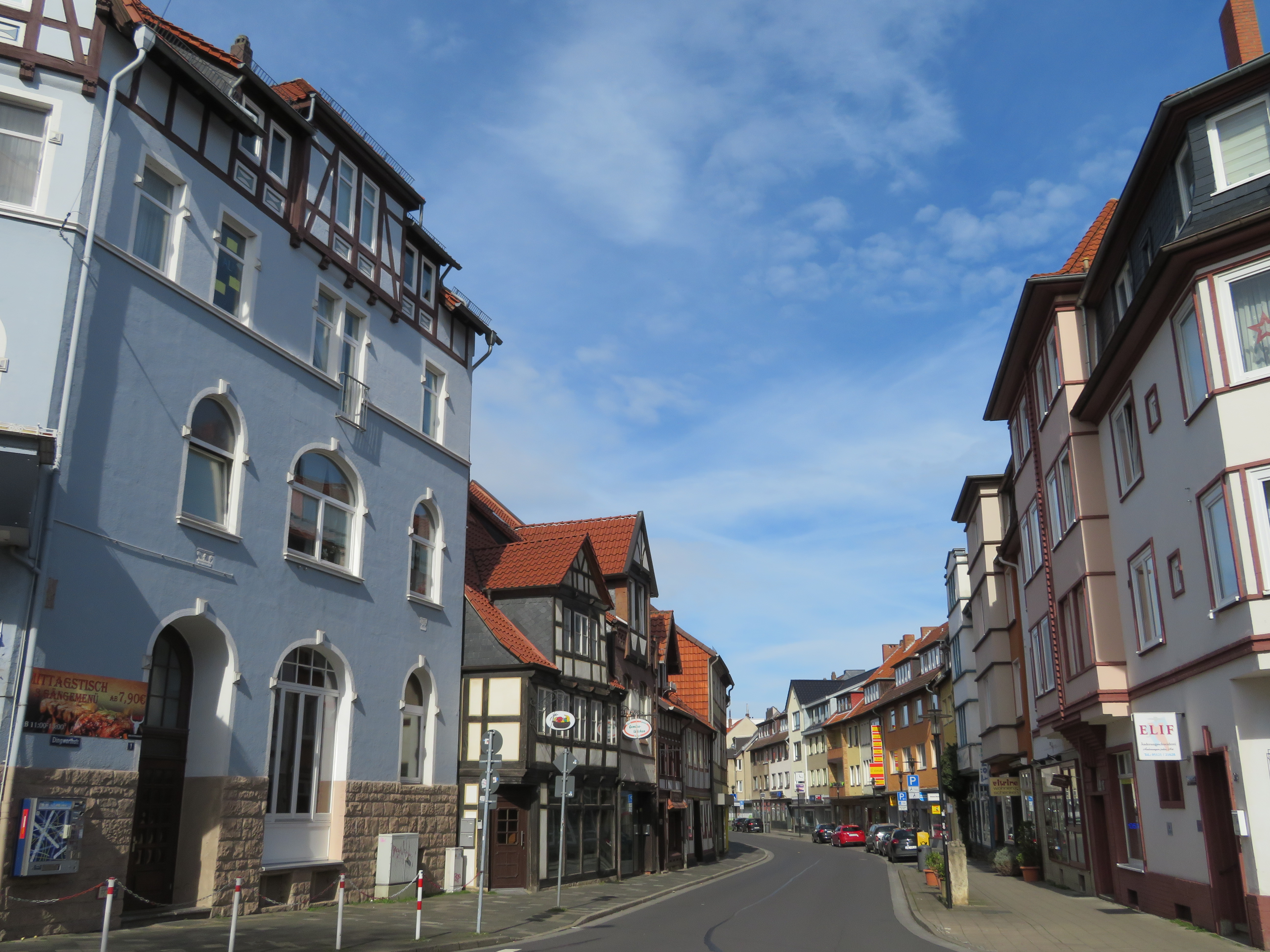
Dingworthstrasse has always been the high street of the quarter

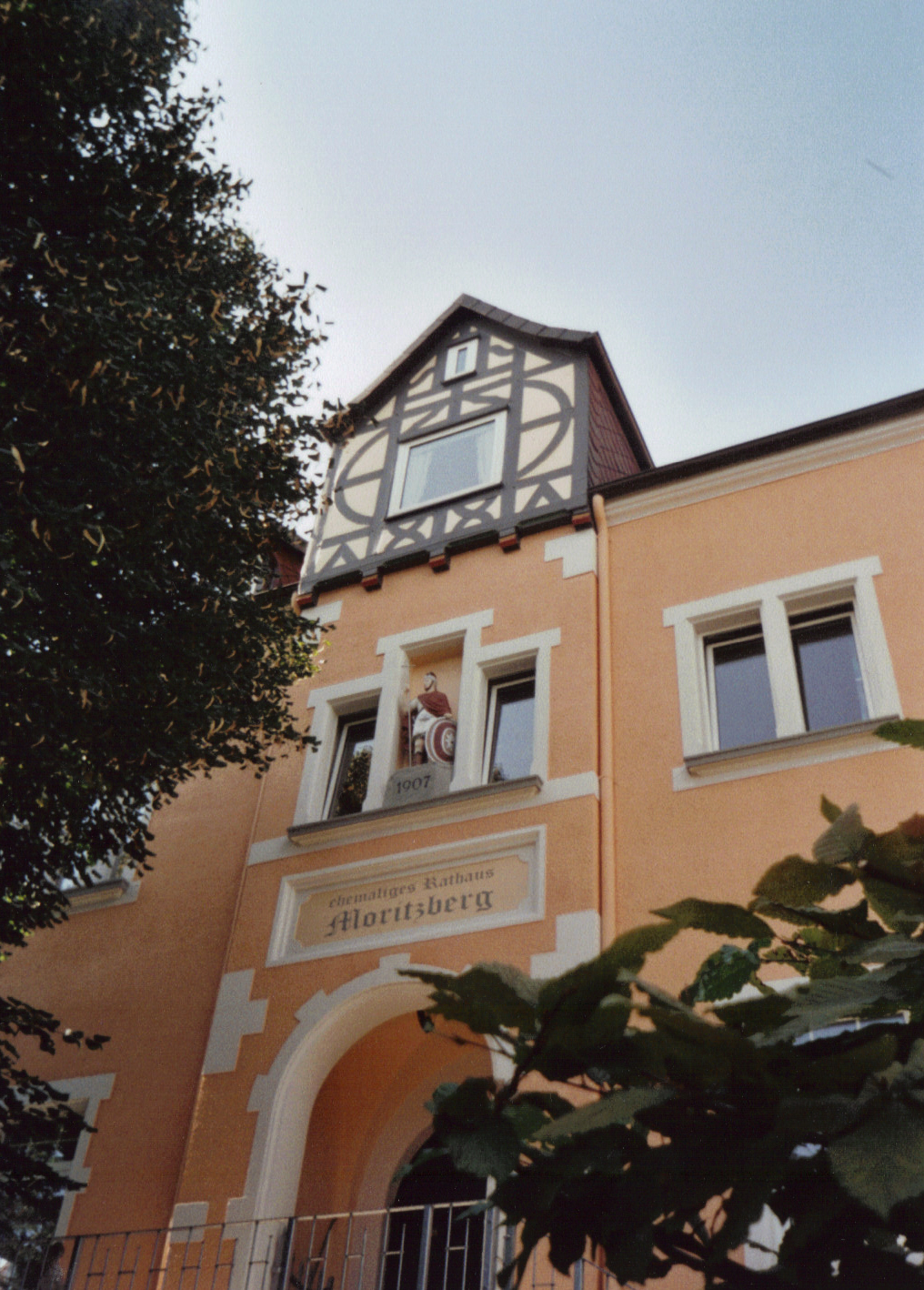
Former Town Hall (1907).

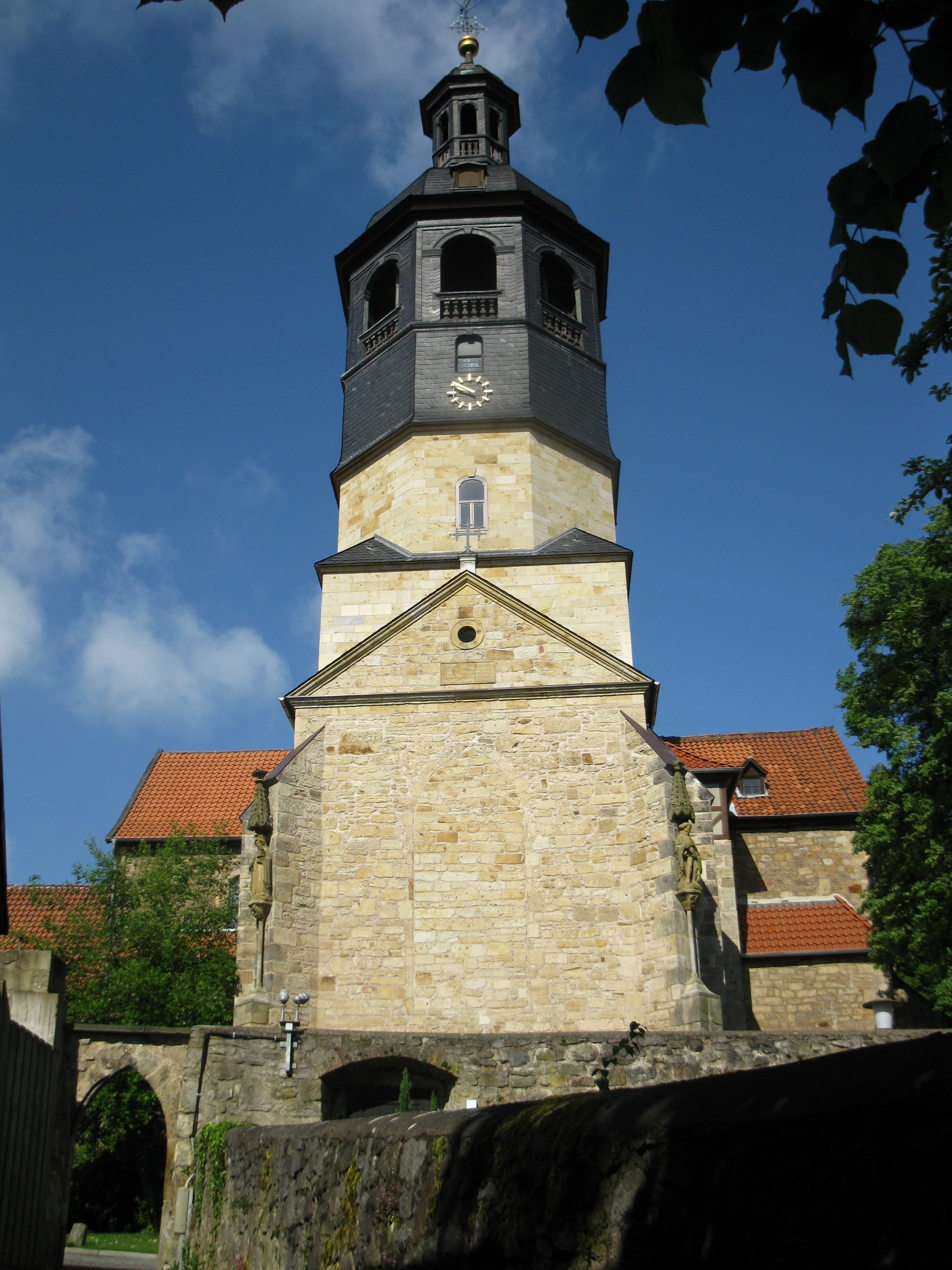
St. Maurice's Church seen from Kleine Steuer.

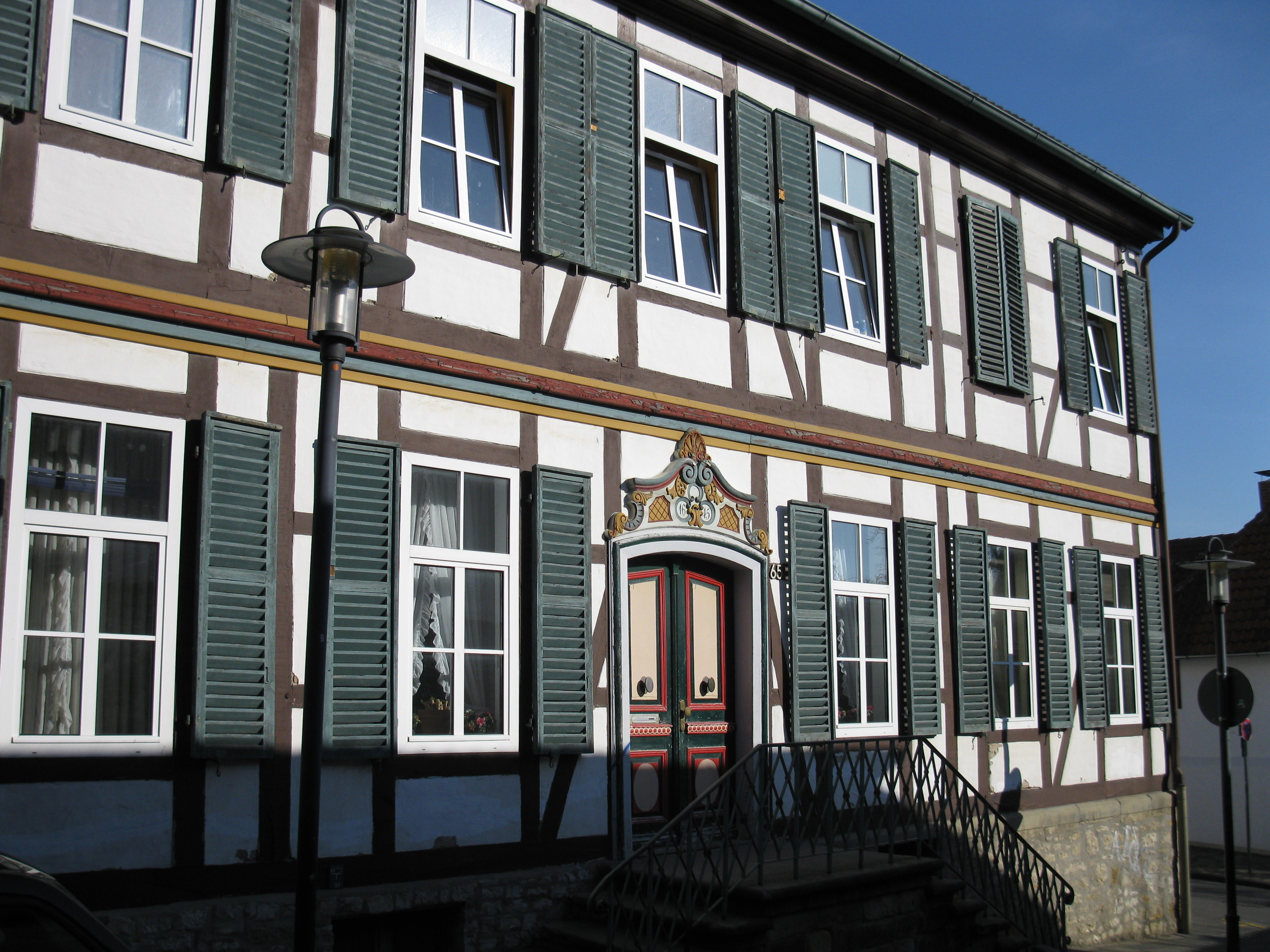
Oldest house (1645).

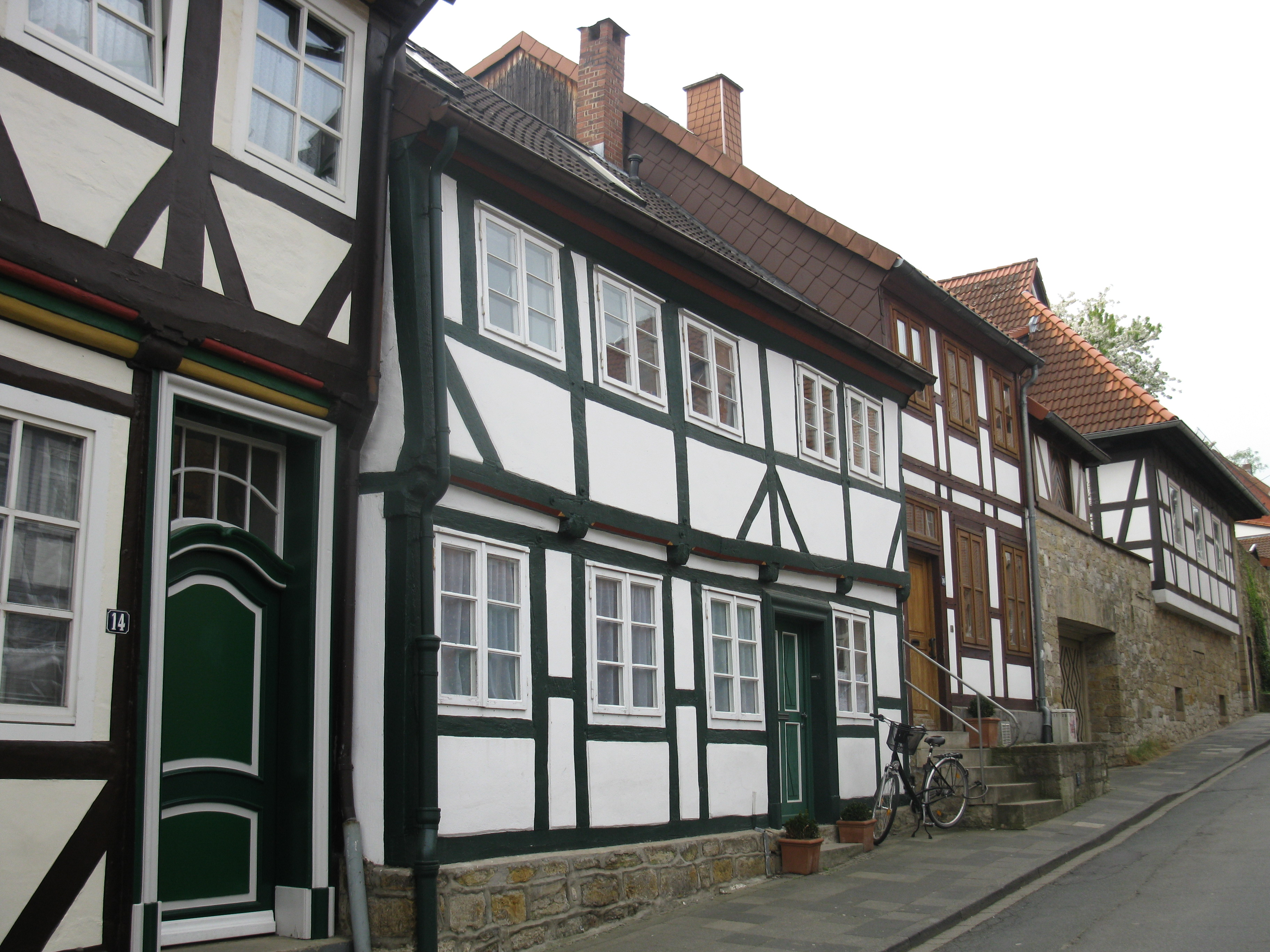
Half-timbered houses in Bergstrasse.

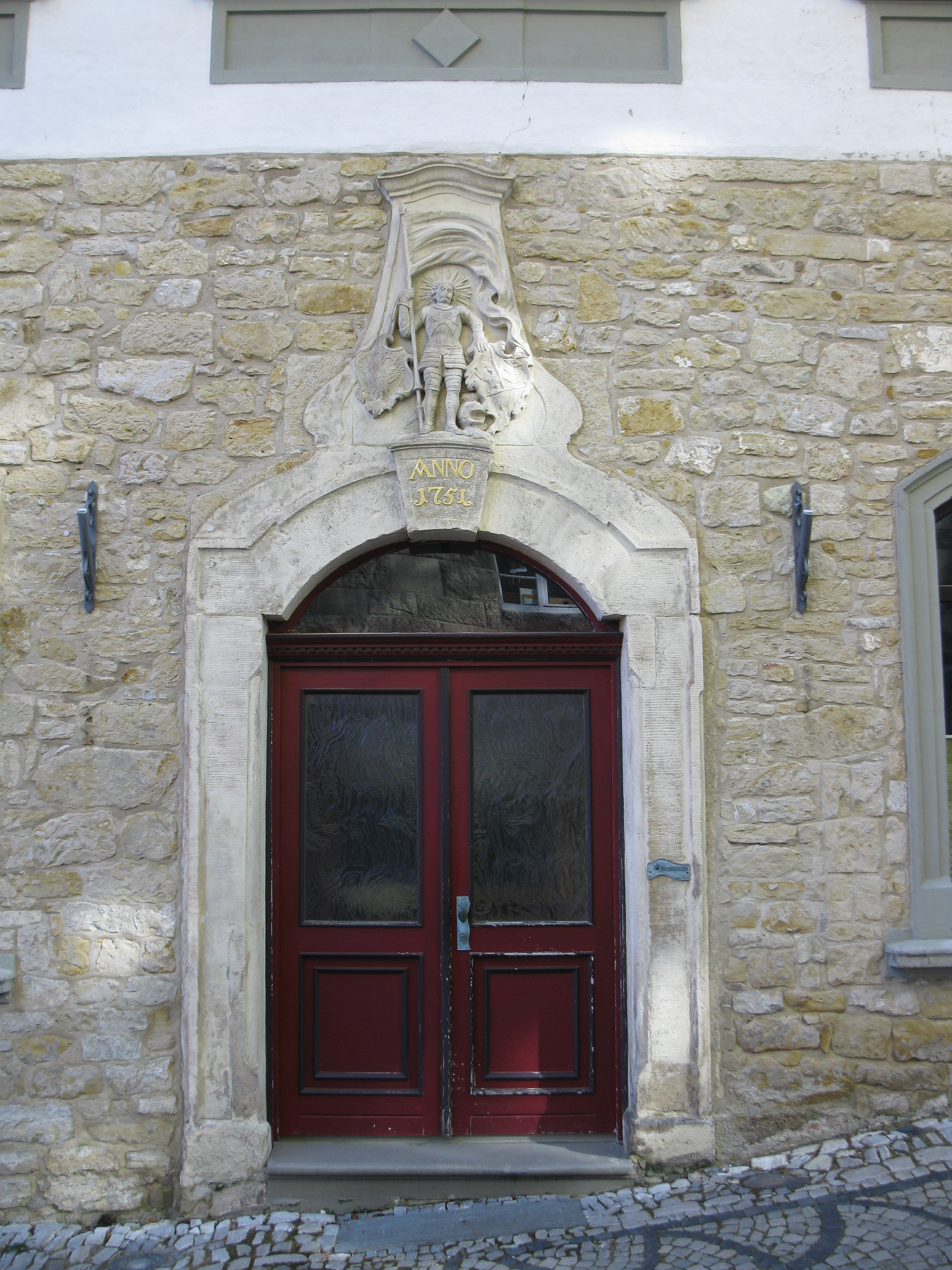
Relief of Saint Maurice on the Old Brewery (1751).

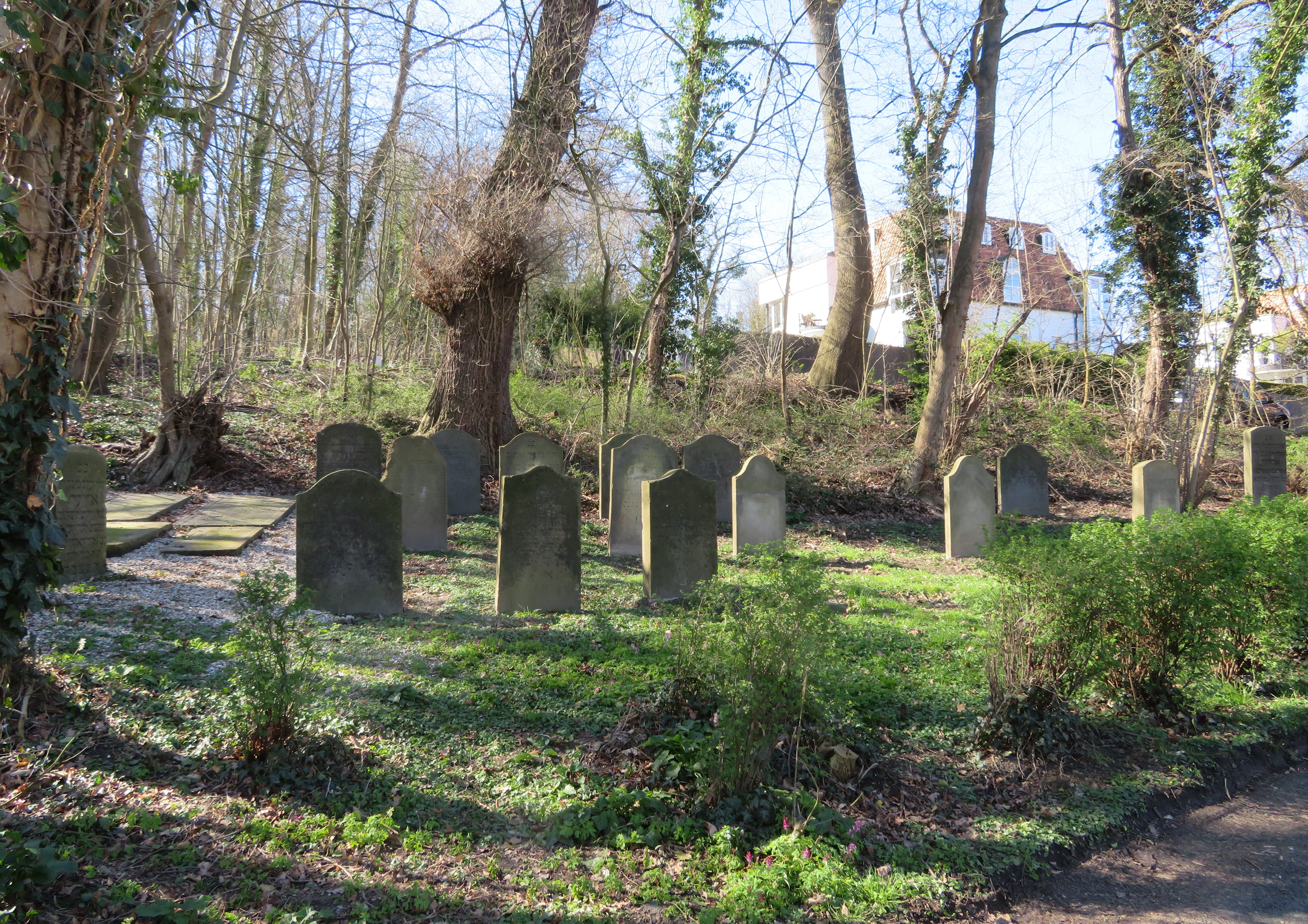
Jewish Cemetery.

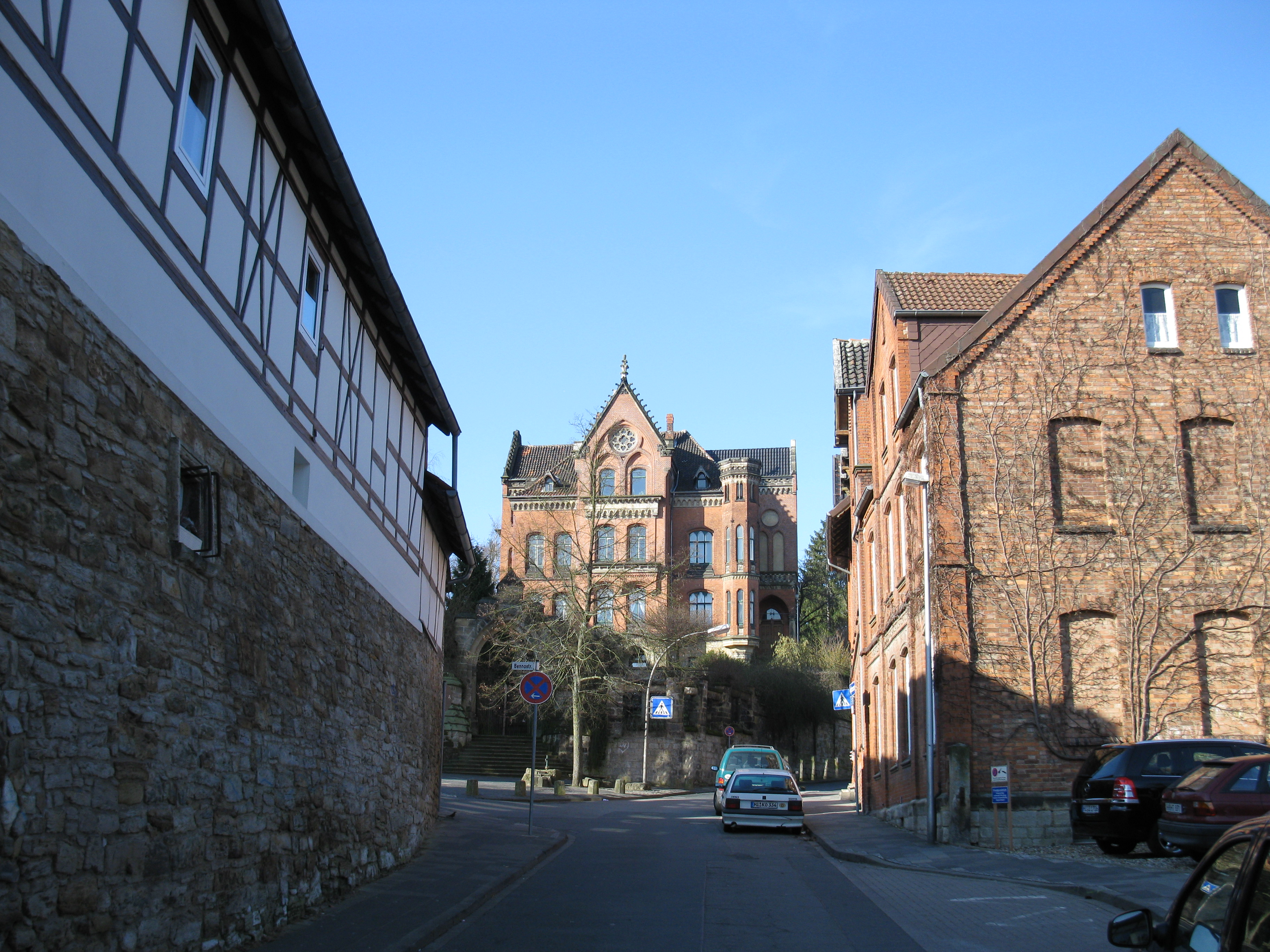
Villa Windhorst (1882-86).

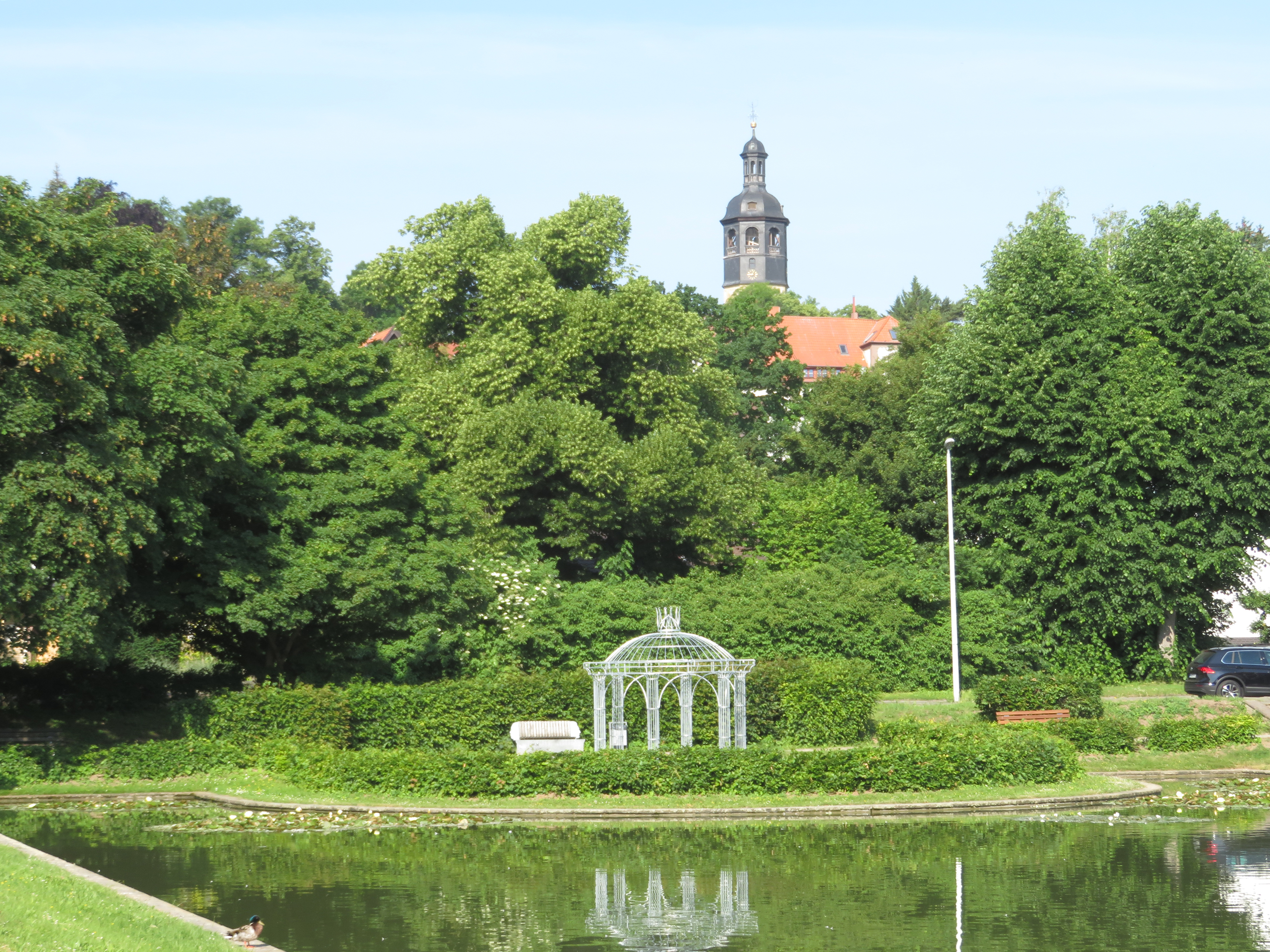
Lake Koenigsteich with the tower of Saint Maurice Church.

Moritzberg is a quarter in the city of Hildesheim in Lower Saxony, Germany. It is on a hill in the west of the city, about a mile from the St. Mary's Cathedral. It was an independent market town until 1911.

== History ==
In the 9th century, Gunthar, the first bishop of Hildesheim (815-835), founded a chapel on a hill called Zierenberg west of Hildesheim. Before Christianization, pagans had worshipped the Germanic god Týr at a sacred well in the same place. Some Germanic tribes called Týr Ziur, and Zierenberg simply meant Týr's Hill. Strategically, the former place of worship and the chapel were in a very advantageous position: the ancient Hellweg trade route ran past the foot of the hill, which offered a clear view of the Innerste valley where the town of Hildesheim was developing at a ford.

One of Gunthar's successors, Bishop Godehard of Hildesheim (1022–38), founded a monastery beside the chapel on the Zierenberg about 1025 and had a church built there which was dedicated to Saint Maurice and consecrated in 1028. Maurice means Mauritius or Moritz in German, and so the name of the hill was changed to Moritzberg ("Maurice Hill"). A village bearing the same name developed around the monastery and at the foot of the hill beside the trade route in the Early Middle Ages. Most of its inhabitants worked for the monastery.

In the 12th century, many Flemish immigrants settled in northern Germany. They were welcome as they were hard-working and experienced in colonizing the land. The provost of Saint Maurice's monastery allowed Flemish settlers to found a new town between Moritzberg and Hildesheim in 1196. The new settlement, which was called Dammstadt, was supported by the Bishop of Hildesheim as well and quickly developed into a prosperous village which obtained town rights in 1232, i.e. even before Hildesheim was awarded town rights in 1249. The inhabitants of Hildesheim, who did not want to be governed by the bishop any longer, considered neighbouring Dammstadt to be a danger to the economic growth of their own town. They attacked Dammstadt on 24 December 1332 and destroyed it completely. As many inhabitants of Dammstadt sought refuge in Moritzberg, that village was attacked as well and suffered considerable damage. Dammstadt was never rebuilt and repopulated. In 1347, the townsfolk of Hildesheim attacked and looted Moritzberg, drove the inhabitants out of the village and destroyed it. Moritzberg, however, was rebuilt and repopulated.

In the 15th century, a moat and a rampart were built to fortify the village. In the east, Moritzberg was protected by the Kupferstrang, a small tributary of the Innerste. For many centuries, the Kupferstrang formed the border between Hildesheim and Moritzberg. There were three gates to the village. In 1430, the Katztor was mentioned for the first time in the records; it had a tower, 28 feet high. The Krehlator had a tower 25 feet high, and the third gate, the Dingworthtor, at the northern end of the high street, was mentioned for the first time in 1452.

When Protestantism was introduced into Hildesheim and its surrounding area in 1542, the inhabitants of Moritzberg and several other villages, e.g. Sorsum, refused to convert. Protestants were not even allowed to live in Moritzberg. There was, however, a Jewish community with a synagogue in the high street, a school and a Jewish cemetery which still exists. Several times, Jews from Hildesheim sought refuge in Moritzberg.

During the Thirty Years' War, Moritzberg suffered much more damage than Hildesheim. After Christian IV of Denmark had intervened in the fighting, Moritzberg was looted by Danish soldiers in 1626 and Saint Maurice's Church was heavily damaged. After the intervention of Gustavus Adolphus of Sweden, Moritzberg was destroyed by Swedish troops in 1632. The village was rebuilt after the war. The oldest surviving house in the quarter today dates from 1645. The monastery and Saint Maurice's Church were rebuilt from 1644 to 1660.

After the Thirty Years' War, Moritzberg was granted market rights by Maximilian Henry of Bavaria in 1652. He wanted to promote the economic recovery of the Roman Catholic village which had suffered from the ravages of war, but there has never been a dedicated market place in Moritzberg. Presumably the market was held along the ancient trade route in Dingworthstrasse which has always been the high street of Moritzberg. It might have been an oblong street market. Originally, the city of Hildesheim did not have a proper market place either, but an oblong street market in a street called Alter Markt (Old Market) which still exists today. In 1699, Moritzberg had a total of 114 houses.

In the 18th century, Moritzberg developed into a flourishing, but small town. There were several breweries and inns that were very profitable. As the beer tax of Hildesheim was higher than in Moritzberg, many citizens of Hildesheim went to Moritzberg frequently to buy beer. Saint Maurice's was transformed into a baroque church in 1744-47. The tower was built in 1765. When the first census was held in 1785 the population numbered 673 inhabitants.

During secularization the monastery was dissolved. In 1810, Saint Maurice's became the parish church of Moritzberg. The former parish church had to be demolished because of its dilapidated condition.

In 1803, Moritzberg had 757 inhabitants. Most of them were Roman Catholics and 64 were Jews. There were almost no Protestants. When the first factories were founded in Hildesheim in the 19th century, many workers preferred to live in Moritzberg because rents were lower there. So the number of Protestant residents gradually rose, and space was required to construct more and more houses. The medieval moat and rampart were levelled. Krehlator gate was demolished in 1818 and Katztor in 1832. In 1830, Moritzberg had 730 inhabitants. Its first factory was founded in 1857.

By the end of the 1870s most of the area between Moritzberg and Hildesheim had been built up, but the city of Hildesheim needed more and more ground to build factories and houses. Several authorities of Hildesheim claimed a complete incorporation of the market town of Moritzberg with all its fields and meadows into the city. The inhabitants of Moritzberg, most of whom were still Roman Catholics, opposed the incorporation as they did not want to live in a city where Protestants had the absolute majority. They asked Ludwig Windhorst, a Roman Catholic minister of the government in Berlin and president of the Centre Party, for help. Windhorst managed to prevent its incorporation in 1882 so that Moritzberg could remain an independent market town. The citizens of Moritzberg were very thankful and built a large villa (Villa Windhorst) on the hill that was completed in 1886. They wanted to present the villa to Windhorst, but he declined the present as he lived in Berlin.

In 1885 the number of inhabitants amounted to 1,889, and in 1895 Moritzberg had 3,326 inhabitants of whom 1,652 were Roman Catholics and 1,674 were Protestants. From then on, there were more Protestant inhabitants in Moritzberg than Roman Catholics. A Protestant school was built in 1888.

At the beginning of the 20th century Moritzberg had 4,175 inhabitants. The first Protestant Church in Moritzberg, Christuskirche, was built 1904-1907 in a Neogothic style. The first town hall of Moritzberg was inaugurated in 1907.

On 1 April 1911 Moritzberg was incorporated into the city of Hildesheim and lost its independence to become a quarter of Hildesheim. The number of inhabitants amounted to 4,442. During World War II, Moritzberg as a whole was spared severe bomb damage. On 22 March 1945, however, one factory was heavily damaged and some houses were destroyed. The historic sights remained undamaged. On a house in Godehardistrasse, a sundial recalls the destruction of 22 March 1945 and the reconstruction in 1947.

== Moritzberg today ==
After the war, new residential areas were built, especially in the west and south of the old town centre of Moritzberg. Historic Dingworthstrasse, which was mentioned for the first time in 1728, is still the high street with several shops. Every year a traditional market, the Pflockflötchenmarkt, is held in Bergstrasse on Whit Monday. The name refers to flutes carved from willow branches which were sold there in former times. The art of carving flutes from willow branches is demonstrated by elderly citizens. There is still a Roman Catholic primary school as well as a Protestant primary school. Moritzberg is a much-liked quarter with several historic sights, steep streets, some old, picturesque lanes, a well-kept park around Lake Koenigsteich which was laid out in 1930 with a pavilion dating from May 2021 and a forest from where there is a beautiful view of Hildesheim. At present the number of inhabitants amounts to about 15,000.

== Sights ==
- Saint Maurice's Church, a former collegiate church is one of the oldest churches in Hildesheim. The Romanesque cloister dates from the 12th century. The interior is Baroque, the organ dates from 1568 and the main altar from 1735. The tower was built in 1765.
- The Jewish Cemetery in Bennostrasse was used from 1800-1849. 29 gravestones with inscriptions in Hebrew, German and English can be seen.
- Villa Windhorst was built 1882-86. The citizens of Moritzberg wanted to present it to the politician Ludwig Windhorst who prevented the incorporation of Moritzberg into Hildesheim in the 1880s, but he opted to live in Berlin.
- Old Brewery dating from 1751 in Bennostrasse. A sandstone relief showing Saint Maurice can be seen above the entrance. On the corner of Bennostrasse and Bergstrasse there is another interesting relief showing Saint Maurice dating from 1730.
- There are still many well-preserved half-timbered houses in Moritzberg, especially in the steep street of "Bergstrasse". The oldest is "Brenkenscher Hof" (Bergstrasse 65) which was built in 1645. Kratzbergscher Hof opposite Saint Maurice's Church dates from 1654.
- From Berghoelzchen Forest behind Saint Maurice's Church there is a beautiful view of Hildesheim. From one of the viewing points, nine different churches can be seen.
- On the corner of Bennostrasse and Bennoburg there is an interesting stone cross from the middle of the 19th century. In former times people went there during the procession of Corpus Christi.
- Former Town Hall of Moritzberg dating from 1907. Above the entrance there is a statue of Saint Maurice.
- The picturesque lane Kleine Steuer is one of the narrowest streets of Hildesheim. It can be reached from the church through a Gothic arch and offers an impressive view of the Baroque church tower.
