= Gelber Stern (Hildesheim) =

Gelber Stern (German pronunciation: [ˈɡɛlbɐ ˈʃtɛʁn]) is a historic street in Hildesheim, a city in Lower Saxony in Germany.

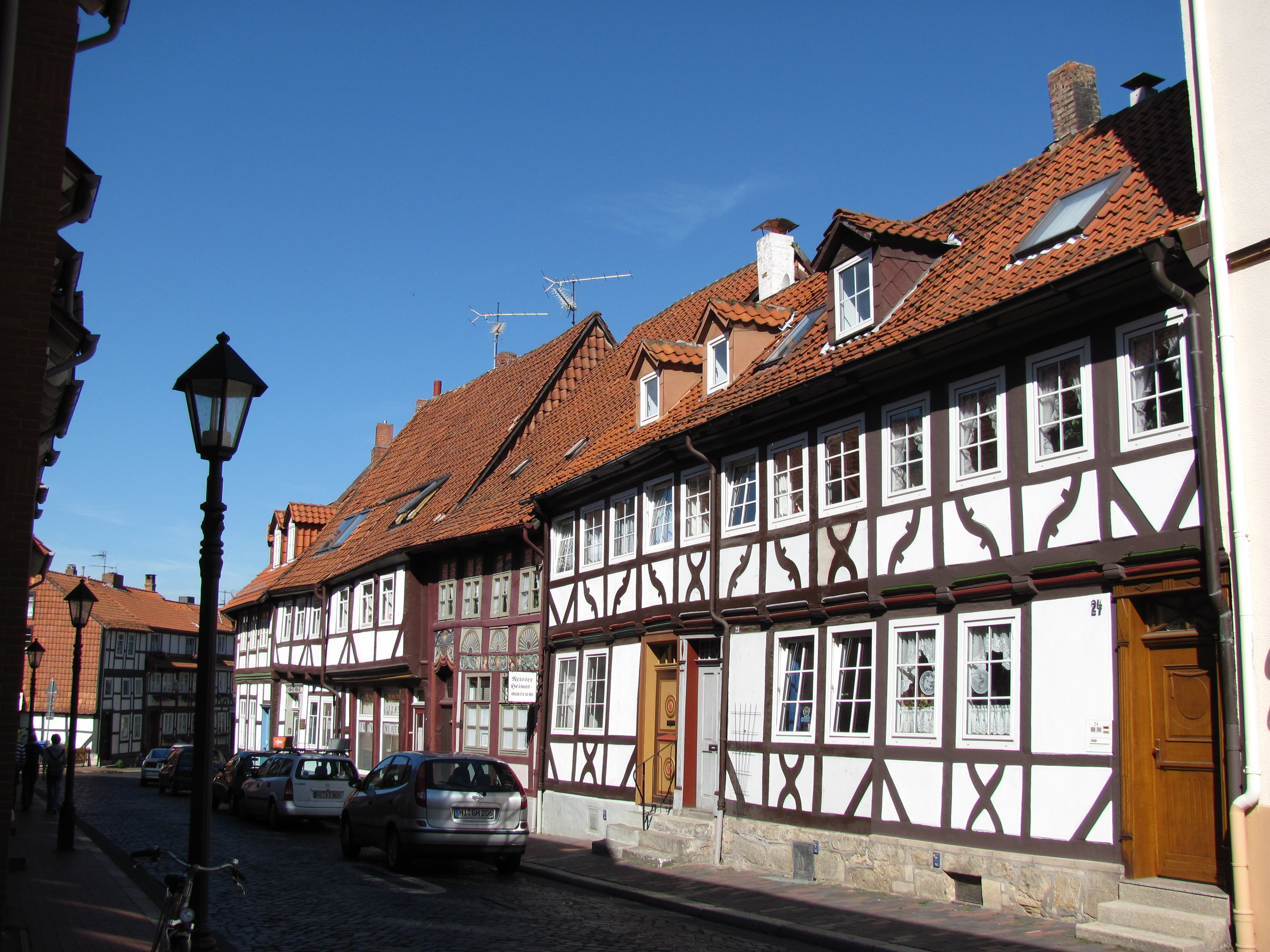
Gelber Stern

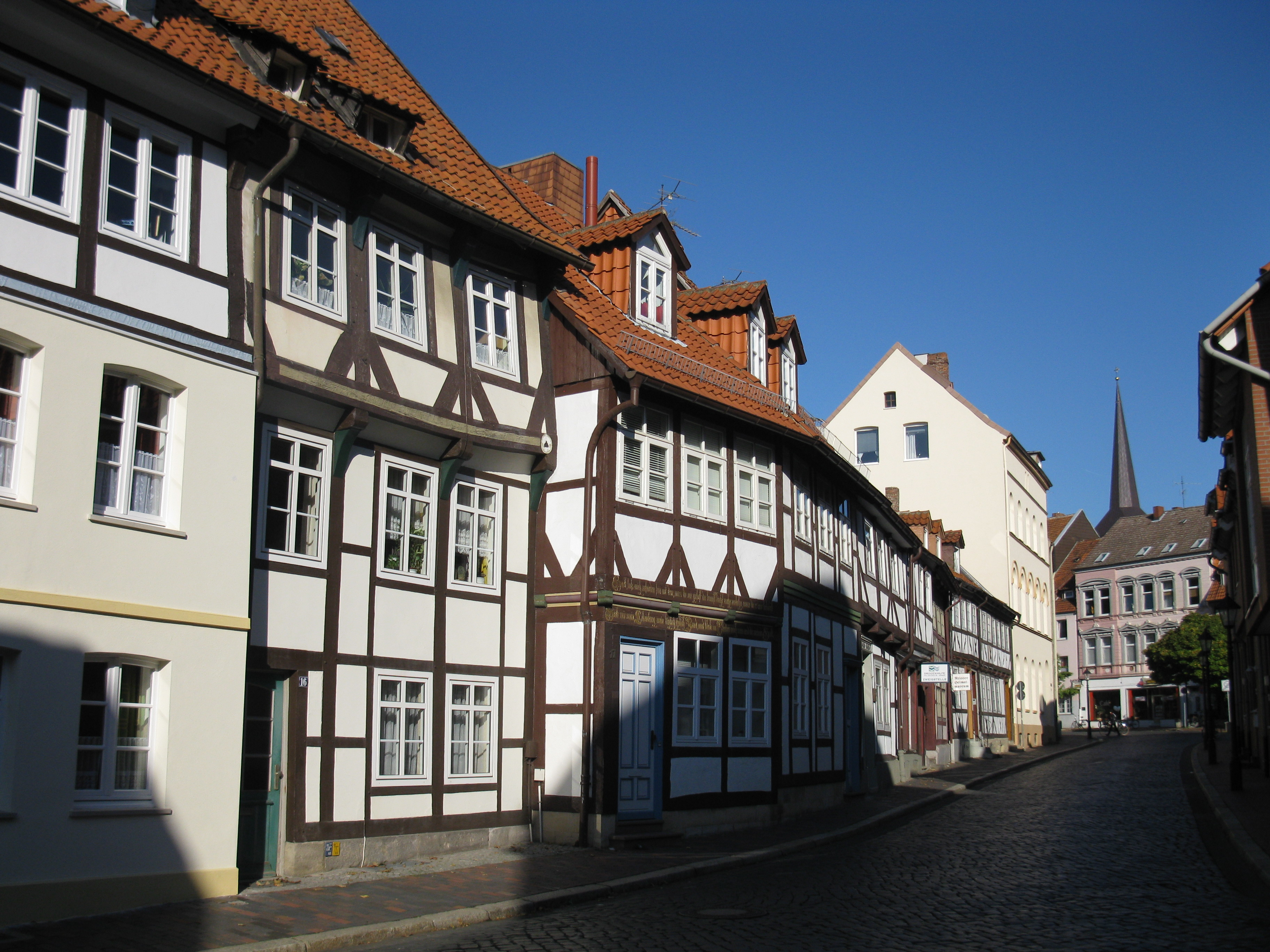
Gelber Stern

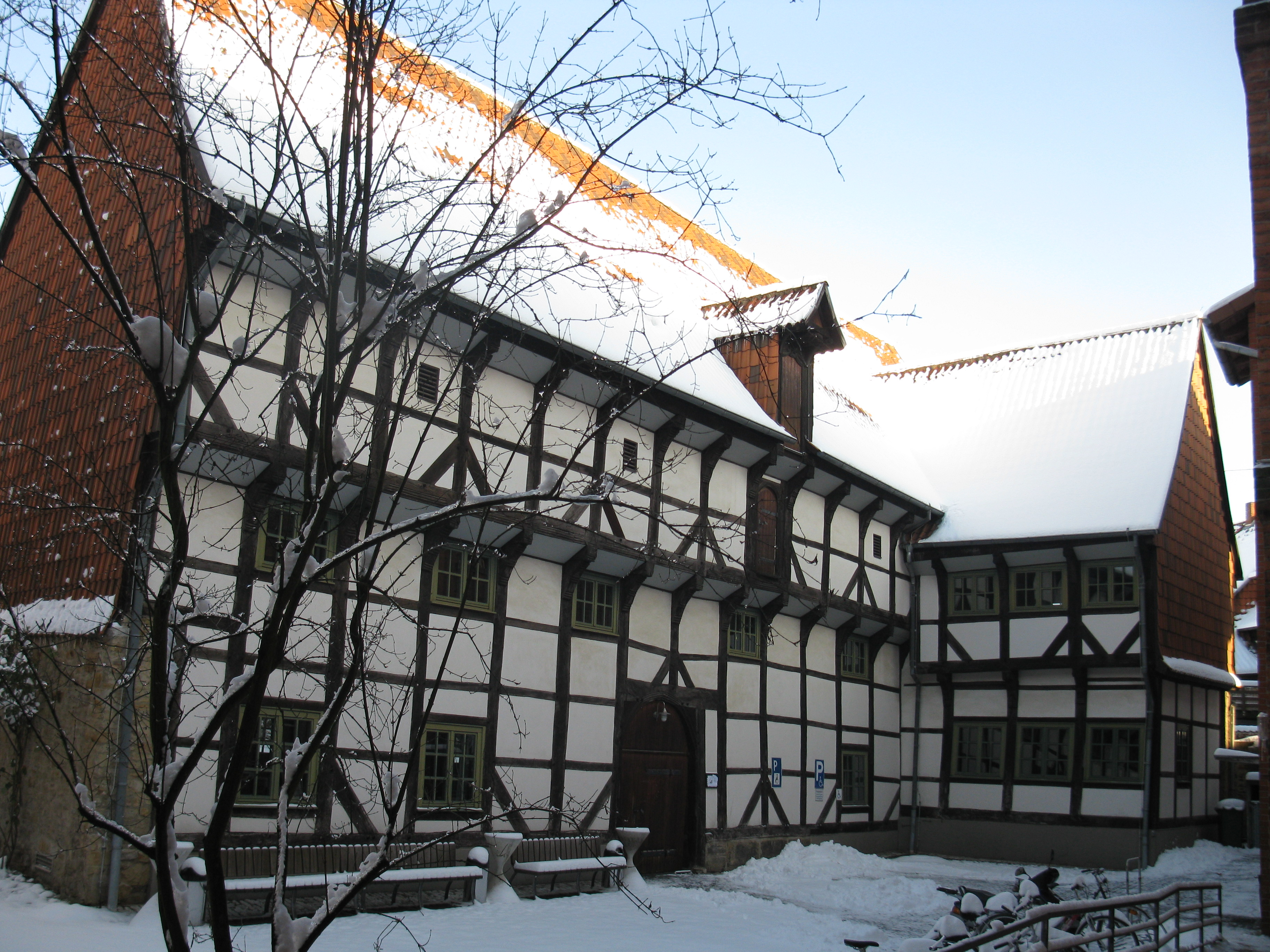
Half-timbered house dating from the end of the 15th century

== Location and Length ==
Gelber Stern is a street with 135 m in length in the Southern part of the city center. Lappenberg, the middle of the former Jewish community, is close by.

== History ==
In a document dating from 1650 the street was mentioned for the first time. Its name was then "Geiler Stert", but the meaning of this name remains unknown. The present name "Gelber Stern" has been used since the beginning of the 19th century. Literally translated it means "Yellow Star", but most probably this name does not refer to the Star of David as the street was not a part of the Jewish community.

In the Second World War, Gelber Stern and the streets and lanes around received comparatively little damage. Some houses were lightly damaged during air raids on 22 February 1945 and on 22 March 1945, but the damage could be repaired preserving the original style after the war.

== Sights and Architecture ==
Gelber Stern is one of the most picturesque streets of Hildesheim as most of the buildings are half-timbered houses. Many of them were built on a sandstone base and in some houses the upper floor is larger than the ground floor. One of the most interesting is no. 21, called Waffenschmiedehaus (Armourer's House) dating from 1548 with colourful wood carvings in a renaissance style. Carved inscriptions can be seen in the façades of several houses, e.g. no. 14 - 16 which were built at the end of the 16th century. A complete prayer consisting of four sentences was carved into the façade of house no. 17.

The large building on the corner of Gelber Stern and Brühl is a former hospital which was built in a classicist style 1833–1840. Today it is used as a priests' seminary. The oldest half-timbered house of Hildesheim, which is used as a library today, can be visited in its inner court. It was built in a gothic style at the end of the 15th century.
