= Anne Gelb =

Mathematician

Anne E. Gelb is a mathematician interested in numerical analysis, partial differential equations and Fourier analysis of images. She is John G. Kemeny Parents Professor of Mathematics at Dartmouth College.

== Research interests ==
Gelb describes her research as "developing highly accurate and efficient data-driven numerical methods for extracting important information in applications such as medical imaging, synthetic aperture radar imaging, climatology, signal processing, and fluid dynamics".

== Education and career ==
Gelb graduated from the University of California, Los Angeles, in 1989, with a bachelor's degree in mathematics. She went to Brown University for her graduate studies, completing a Ph.D. in 1996. Her dissertation, "Topics in Higher Order Methods for Partial Differential Equations", was supervised by David I. Gottlieb.

After postdoctoral research with Herbert Keller at the California Institute of Technology, she joined the department of mathematics and statistics at Arizona State University in 1998. In 2016, she moved from Arizona State to Dartmouth as the John G. Kemeny Parents Professor. She was on the scientific advisory board for the Institute for Computational and Experimental Research in Mathematics (ICERM).

== Recognition ==
Gelb was named as a SIAM Fellow, in the 2026 class of fellows, "for contributions to high-order accurate computational methods for conservation laws and advanced signal and image analysis".
