= Mark H. Gelber =

Scholar of German-Jewish literature (born 1951)

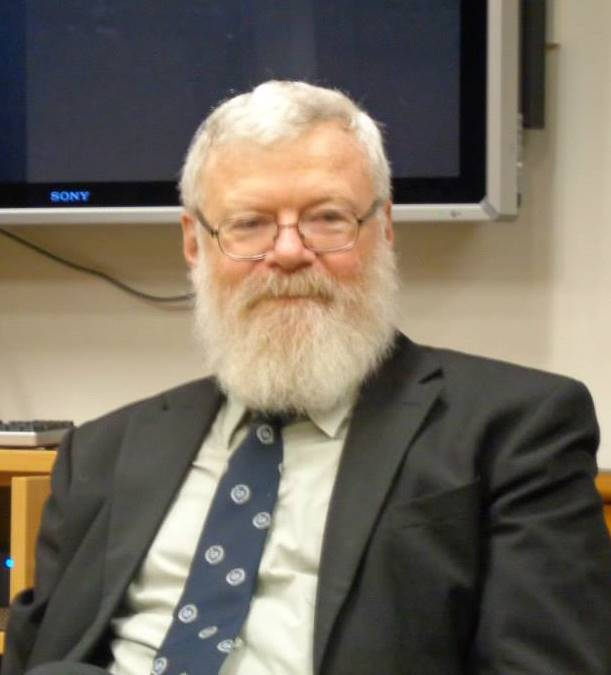
Mark H. Gelber, 2013

Mark. H. Gelber (Hebrew: מרק גלבר; born 1951, Brooklyn, New York) is an American-Israeli scholar of comparative literature and German-Jewish literature and culture.

== Education ==
He received his B.A. in Letters and German at Wesleyan University (Phi Beta Kappa, magna cum laude). He also studied at the University of Bonn, the University of Grenoble, and Tel Aviv University. He was accepted as a Lewis-Farmington Fellow for graduate studies in the Humanities and Social Sciences at Yale University and he received his M.A., M.Phil., and Ph.D. from Yale University.

== Positions and awards ==
In 1980 he was appointed post-doctoral lecturer at Ben-Gurion University of the Negev, Beer Sheva, in the Department of Foreign Literatures and Linguistics. Except for guest professorships and research fellowships abroad, he has been affiliated there since that time.

From 2008-2018 Gelber directed the Research Center for Austrian and German Studies at Ben-Gurion University. He was elected twice Chair of the Department of Foreign Literatures and Linguistics and was appointed Director of the Overseas Student Programs and the Center for International Student Programs at BGU (1996–2004). He established and directed the Internationale Sommeruniversität für Hebräisch, Jüdische Studien und Israelwissenschaften in Beer Sheva (1998–2004, 2009). In November 2008 he was appointed Dean of International Academic Affairs at Ben-Gurion University. In 2009 he was elected to the executive board of the Leo Baeck Institute, Jerusalem, where he served from 2009–2017.

In 2001 Gelber was elected to life membership in the Deutsche Akademie für Sprache und Dichtung (Darmstadt).

Gelber has authored, edited, or co-edited 22 books, published some 100 scholarly essays, and given some 275 lectures at international conferences, symposia and seminars. He was a guest professor at the University of Pennsylvania, Universität Graz, Yale University, University of Maribor, University of Antwerp, Universität Aachen, Renmin University (Beijing) and Sun Yat-Sen University (Guangzhou). He was a guest researcher or fellow at the Universität Tuebingen, the Freie Universität Berlin, Auckland University (New Zealand), and the Viadrina Europa Universität, Frankfurt/Oder as well as at the Selma Stern Zentrum für Jüdische Studien, Berlin-Brandenburg.

A Festschrift in honor of Gelber's emeritate was presented in 2018: Wegweiser und Grenzgänger: Studien zur deutsch-jüdischen Kultur- und Literaturgeschichte. Eine Festschrift für Mark H. Gelber(Böhlau Verlag). A symposium in honor of Gelber, entitled "Austrian/German-Jewish Studies and Their Future," was held at Ben-Gurion University in October, 2018.In the same year he received the prestigious Honorary Medal, First Class for Science and Art from the Republic of Austria. Since 2018 he has been professor emeritus with active researcher status at BGU.

== Bibliography ==
- With Hans Otto Horch and Sigurd Paul Scheichl, Von Franzos zu Canetti. Jüdische Autoren aus Österreich. Neue Studien. (Tübingen: Niemeyer, 1996)
- Melancholy Pride: Nation, Race, and Gender in the German Literature of Cultural Zionism, 2000
- Confrontations/Accommodations: German-Jewish Literary and Cultural Relations from Heine to Wassermann (Tübingen: Niemeyer, 2004)
- Kafka, Zionism, and Beyond (Tübingen: Niemeyer, 2004)
- With Vivian Liska, Theodor Herzl: From Europe to Zion (Tübingen: Niemeyer, 2007)
- With Vivian Liska, Theodor Herzl: From Europe to Zion (Tübingen: Niemeyer, 2007)
- With Jakob Hessing and Robert Jütte, Integration und Ausgrenzung. Studien zur deutsch-jüdischen Literatur- und Kulturgeschichte von der Frühen Neuzeit bis zur Gegenwart (Tübingen: Niemeyer Verlag, 2009)
- Identity and Ethos: A Festschrift for Sol Liptzin on the Occasion of His 85th Birthday, Festchrift for Sol Liptzin (Bern: Peter Lang, 1986)

=== On Stefan Zweig ===
- Stefan Zweig and World Literature: 21st Century Perspectives, edited collection with Birger Vanwesenbeeck (Camden House: 2014)
- Aktualität und Beliebtheit – Neue Forschung und Rezeption von Stefan Zweig im internationalen Blickwinkel, with Zhang Yi (2015)
- Stefan Zweig - Jüdische Relationen. Studien zu Werk und Biographie, conference proceedings (Stefan Zweig Centre's book series, 2017)
