= Gelber Berg =

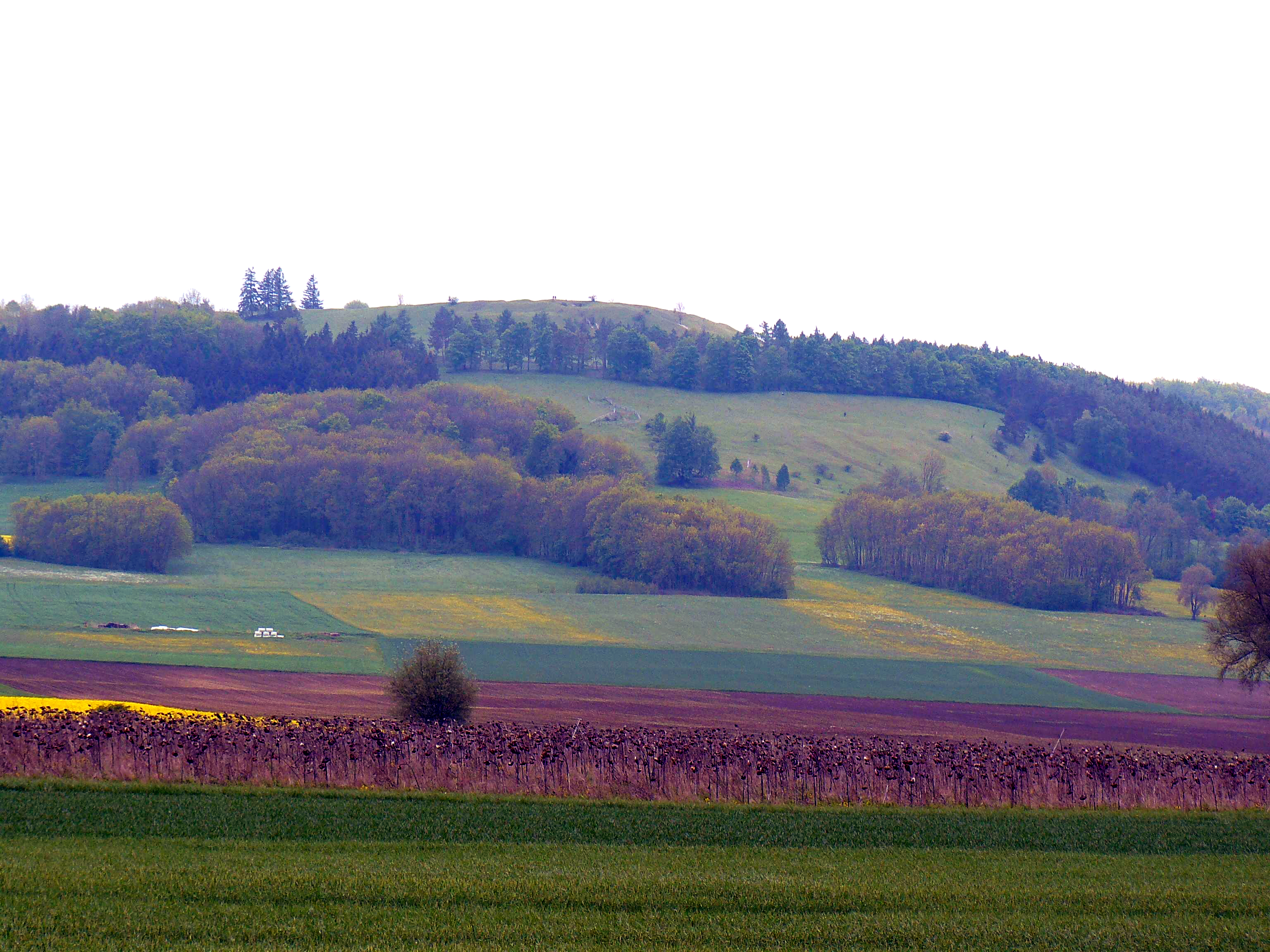

Highest point
- Elevation: 628.4 m (2,062 ft)
- Coordinates: 49°02′25″N 10°45′52″E

Geography
- Location within Bavaria
- Location: Bavaria, Germany

Gelber Berg is a mountain of Bavaria, Germany. The plateau was fortified during the 10th to 8th century BC, in the 6th century BC and during the Migration Period around 400-500 AD.
