= Alexis Gelber =

American journalist and academic

Alexis Gelber is a Goldsmith Fellow at the Joan Shorenstein Center on the Press, Politics and Public Policy at the John F. Kennedy School of Government for the Spring 2011 semester. She is an editorial consultant based in Washington, DC and New York, where she is an adjunct professor at NYU’s Arthur L. Carter Journalism Institute.

In 2009, Gelber was the founding books editor of The Daily Beast. She is a former editor of Newsweek, where she supervised award-winning coverage of politics, social issues and international news as national affairs editor, assistant managing editor, and managing editor of Newsweek International. As Director of Special Projects from 2001 to 2008, she created special issues and new entrepreneurial projects. In 2004 and 2008, Gelber edited Newsweek's special presidential election project, a behind-the-scenes accounts of the election campaigns. Both projects were published as books by PublicAffairs, and the 2004 project won a National Magazine Award.

Gelber is a former president of the Overseas Press Club of America. She graduated from Barnard College and the Columbia University Graduate School of Journalism, where she serves as Chair of the Alumni Board. Her research at the Shorenstein Center will focus on women politicians in the new media age of social networking and cable TV.
