= Sorsum =

Coordinates: 52°8′46″N 9°52′51″E

Sorsum, a district of the city of Hildesheim, is a small village in northern Germany.

== History ==
Over 800 years ago in 1125 Sutterem, later Sorsum, was first mentioned in literature. A memorial in the middle of the village was raised in 2000 to remind on the first mention. In the Middle Ages, a domain was founded in Sorsum to support the Monastery Magdalenenkloster in Hildesheim. Its buildings can still be seen. Sorsum had a water mill which was mentioned in a document in 1215. The mill was built in the south of the village where the restaurant Sorsumer Mühle (Sorsum's Mill), built in 1811, is today. In some other documents, Sorsum was mentioned as Sosserumb in 1496 and as Sorsumb around 1700. In 1785, Sorsum had 335 inhabitants. The present church, Saint Kunibert, was built in 1887/88 in a neoromanic style. The tower was completed in 1908. According to the census of 1895, Sorsum had 731 inhabitants. After the Second World War, the number of inhabitants increased, as many refugees from East Germany settled down in Sorsum. In 1974, Sorsum was incorporated into the city of Hildesheim with about 2,300 inhabitants. On 31 December 2005, the number of inhabitants amounted to 2,844. Today, approximately 3,000 people live in Sorsum.

== Sights ==
- Saint Kunibert Church, built in 1887/88, has a painted wooden ceiling similar to St. Michael's Church, Hildesheim. There is also a noteworthy sandstone relief (15th century) in the church, showing the Annunciation.
- Most of the present buildings of the former domain were built in the 18th century. The impressive manor house, a part of which was built in a half-timbered style, dates from 1734. The large barn was added in 1786 and the remarkable octagonal pigeon tower was built in 1733 with a tent roof. After 2000, the former domain was transformed into a residential area.
- In the Main Street of Sorsum, several well-preserved half-timbered houses can be seen.
- The small Saint Antony's Chapel, which was built in 1725, is another interesting sight of Sorsum in the South of the village.
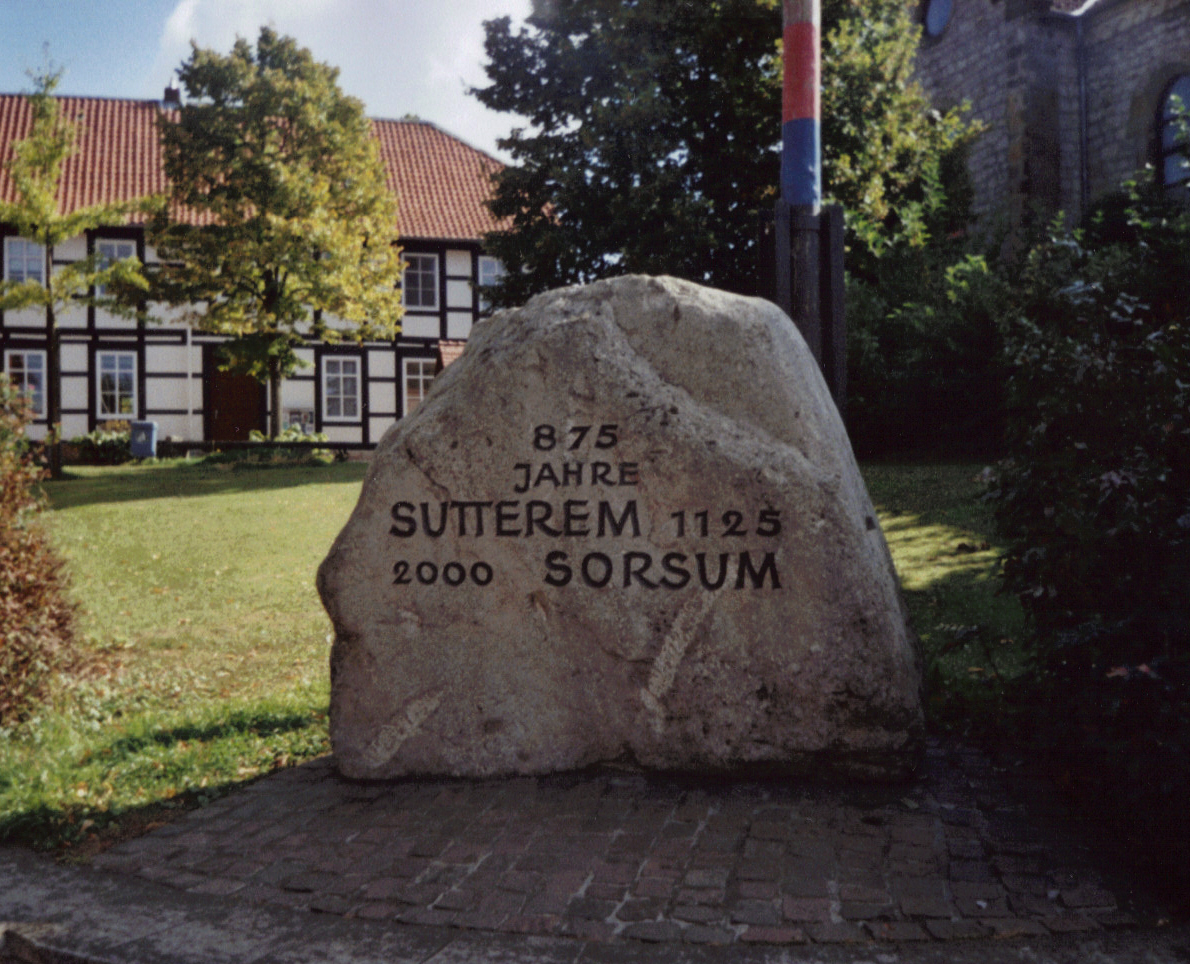
Memorial.

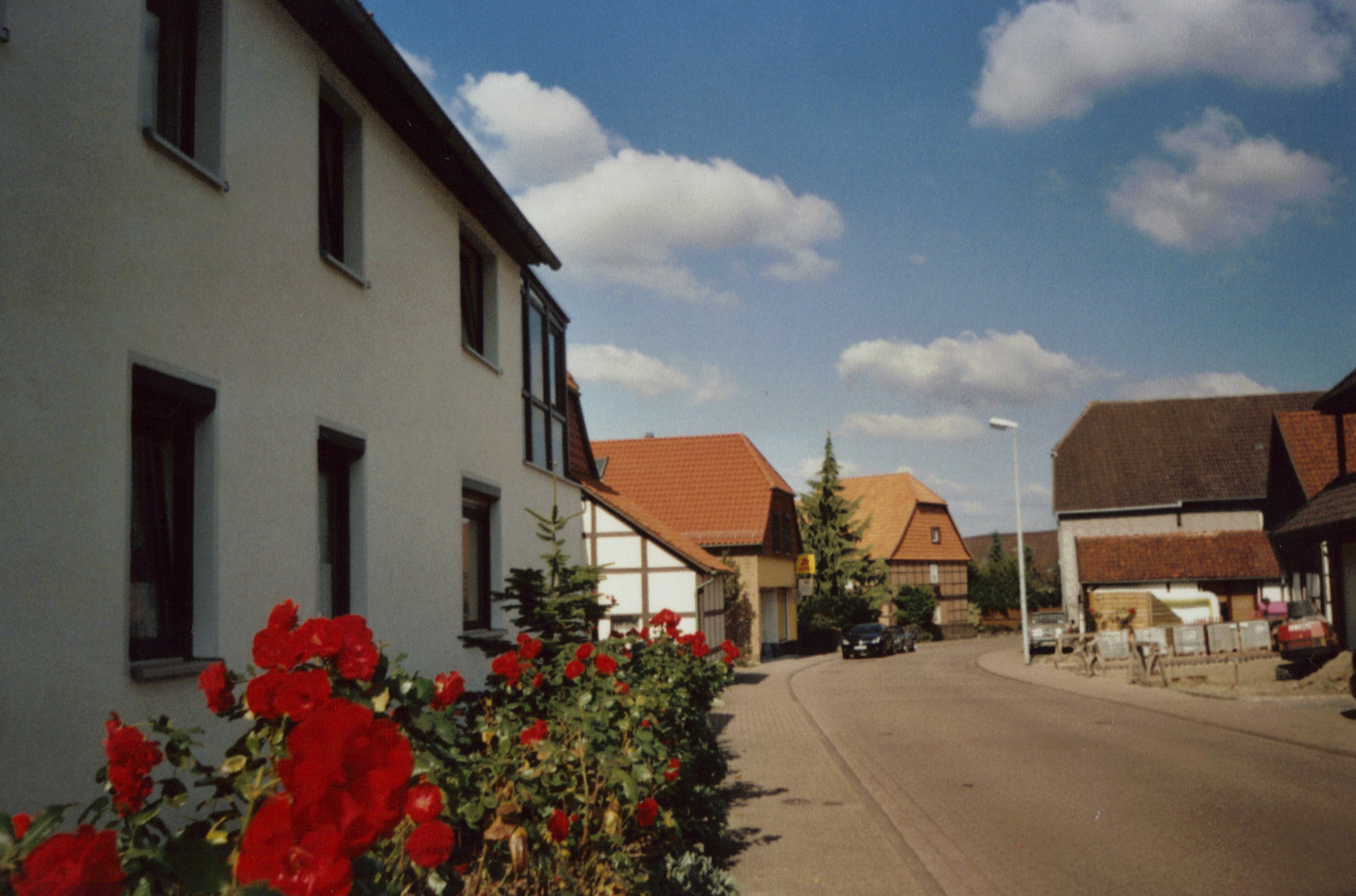
Main Street.

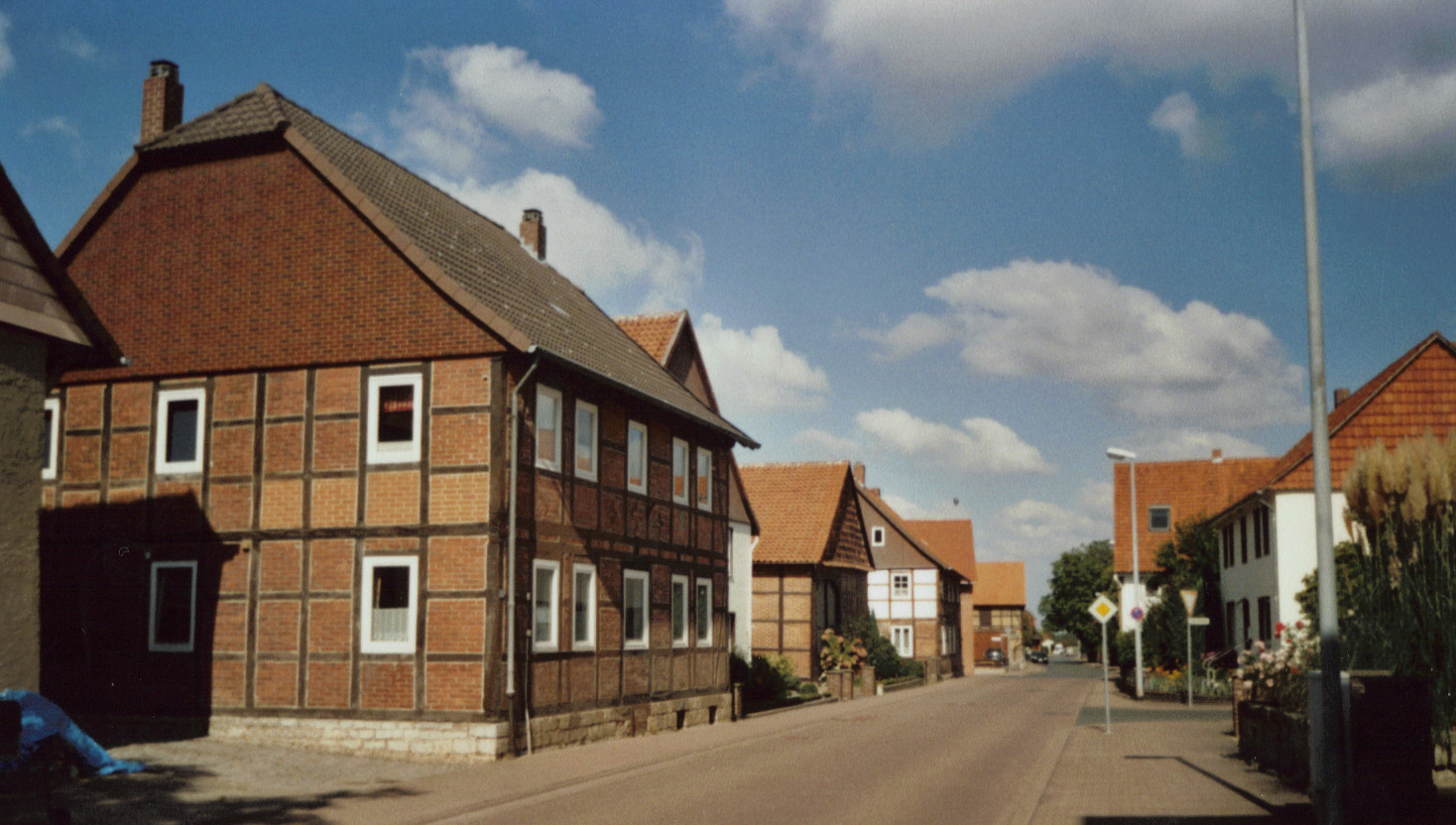
Main Street

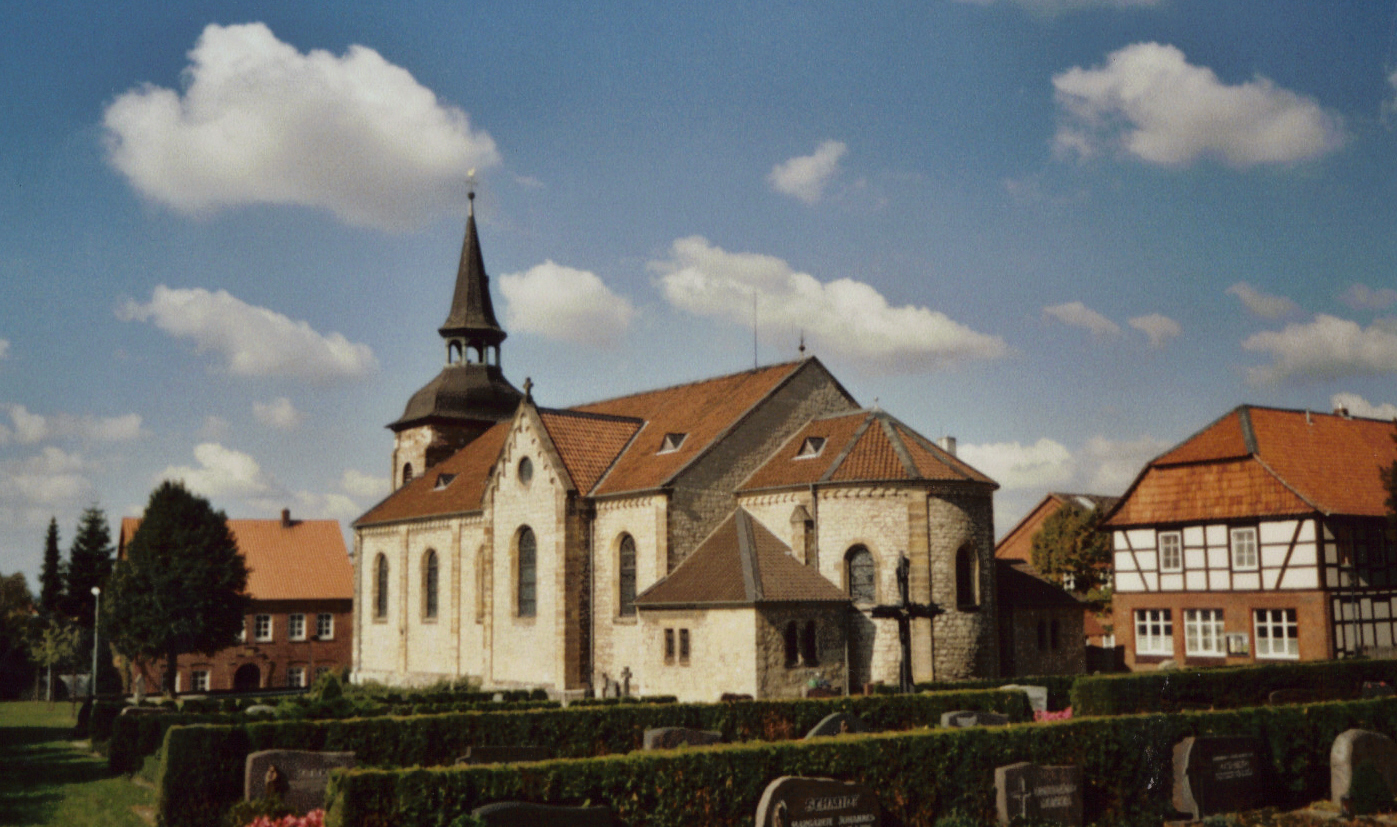
Saint Kunibert Church.

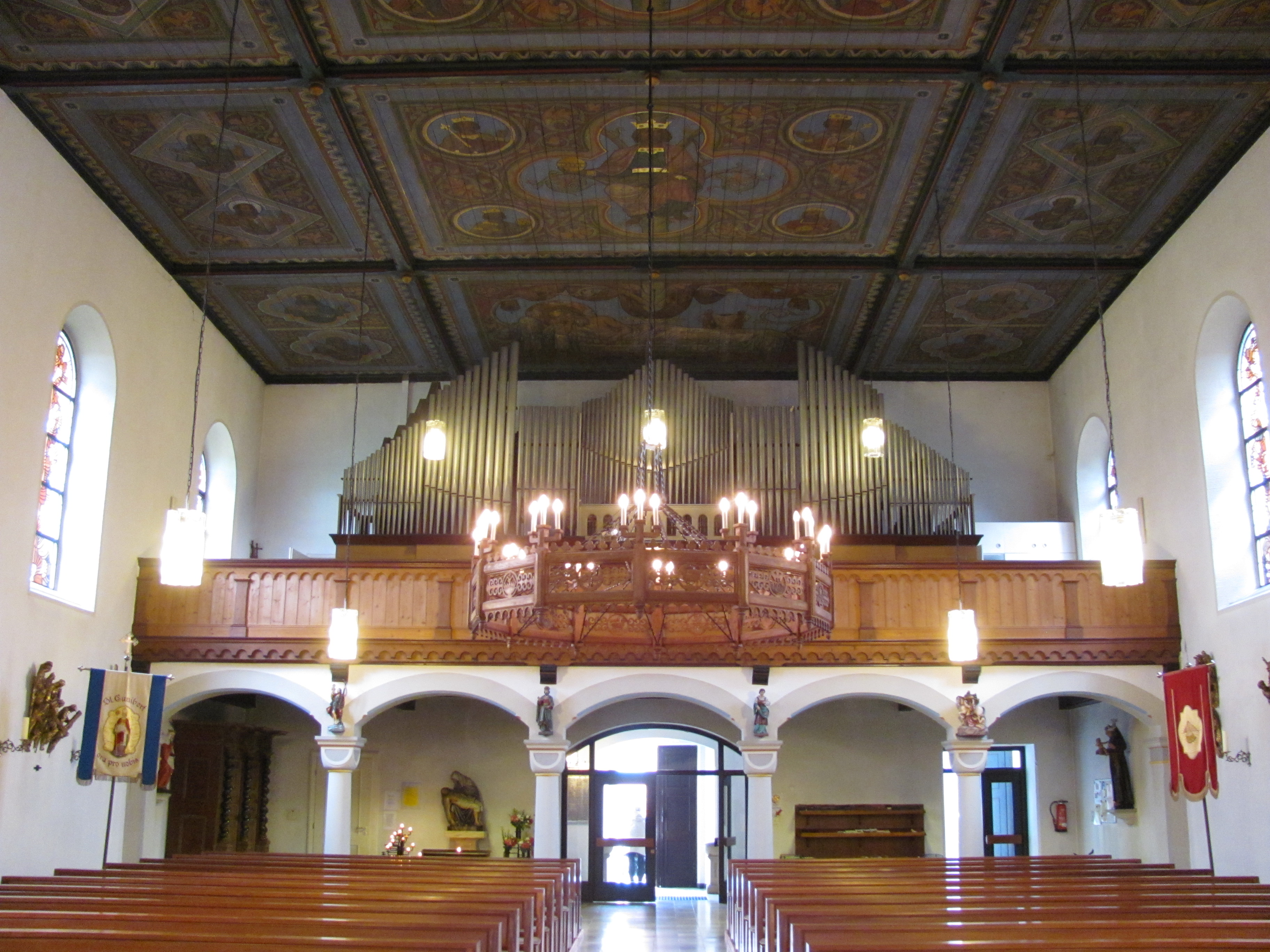
Saint St. Kunibert Church.

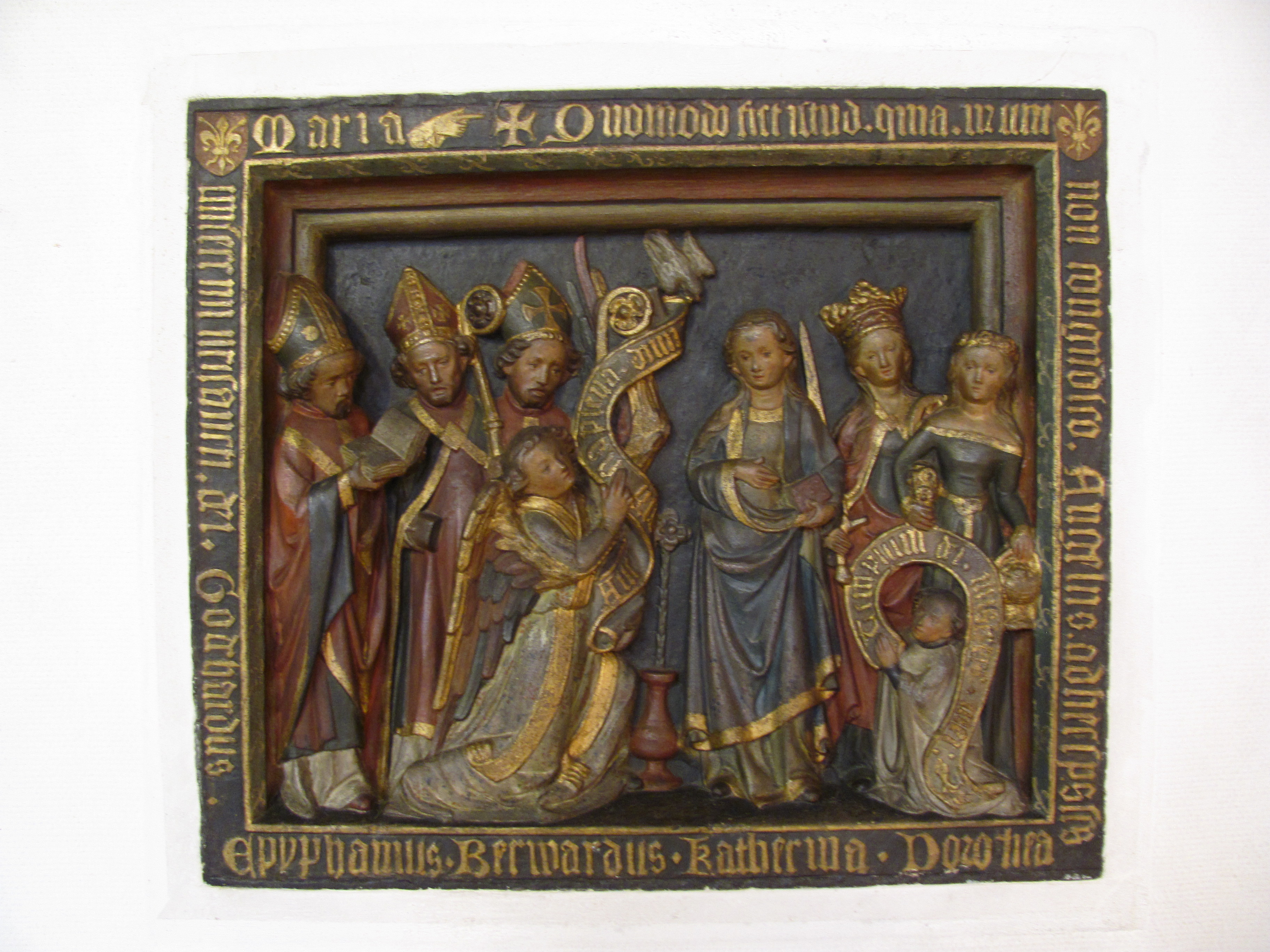
Relief in Saint Kunibert Church.

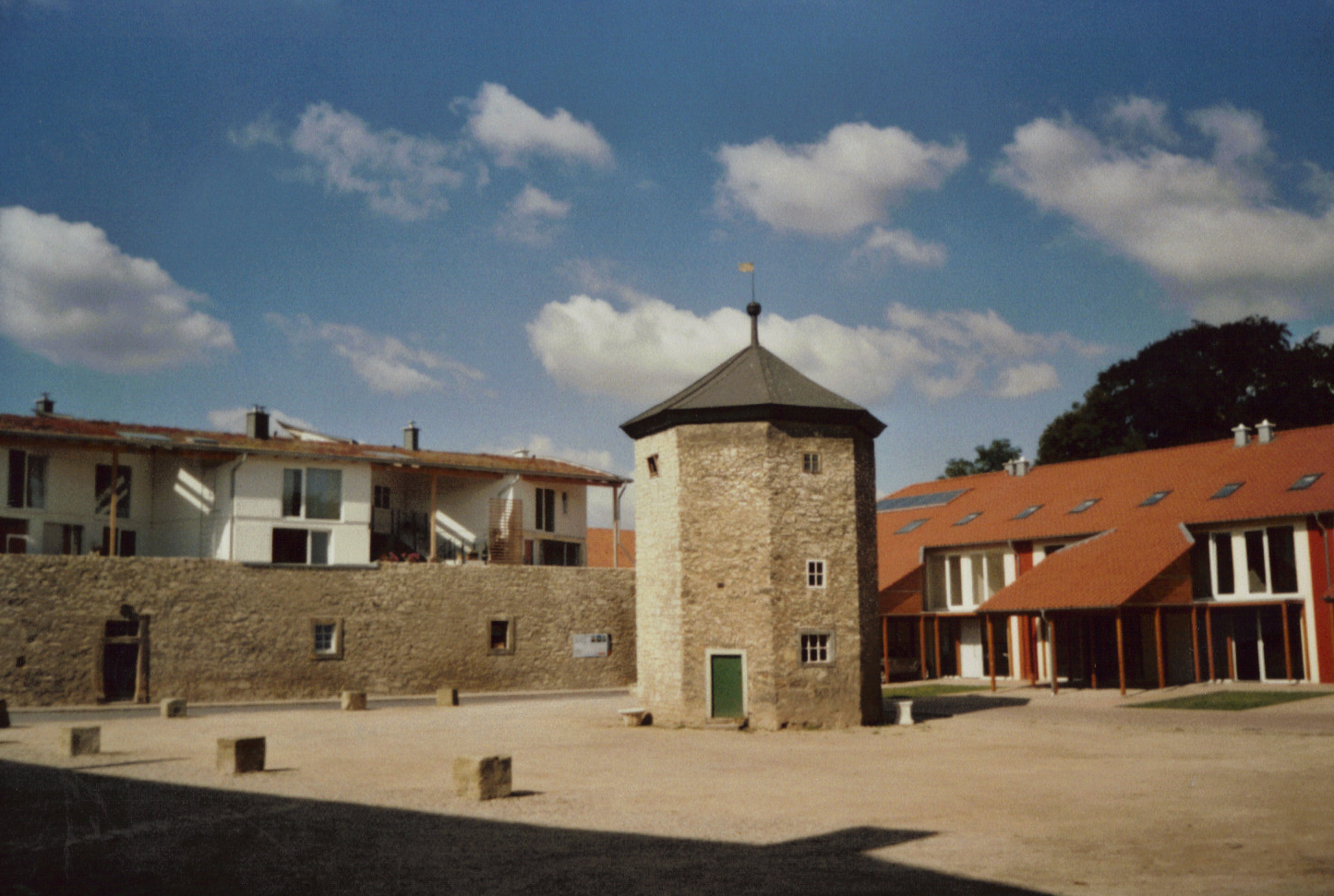
Former domain, Pigeon Tower.

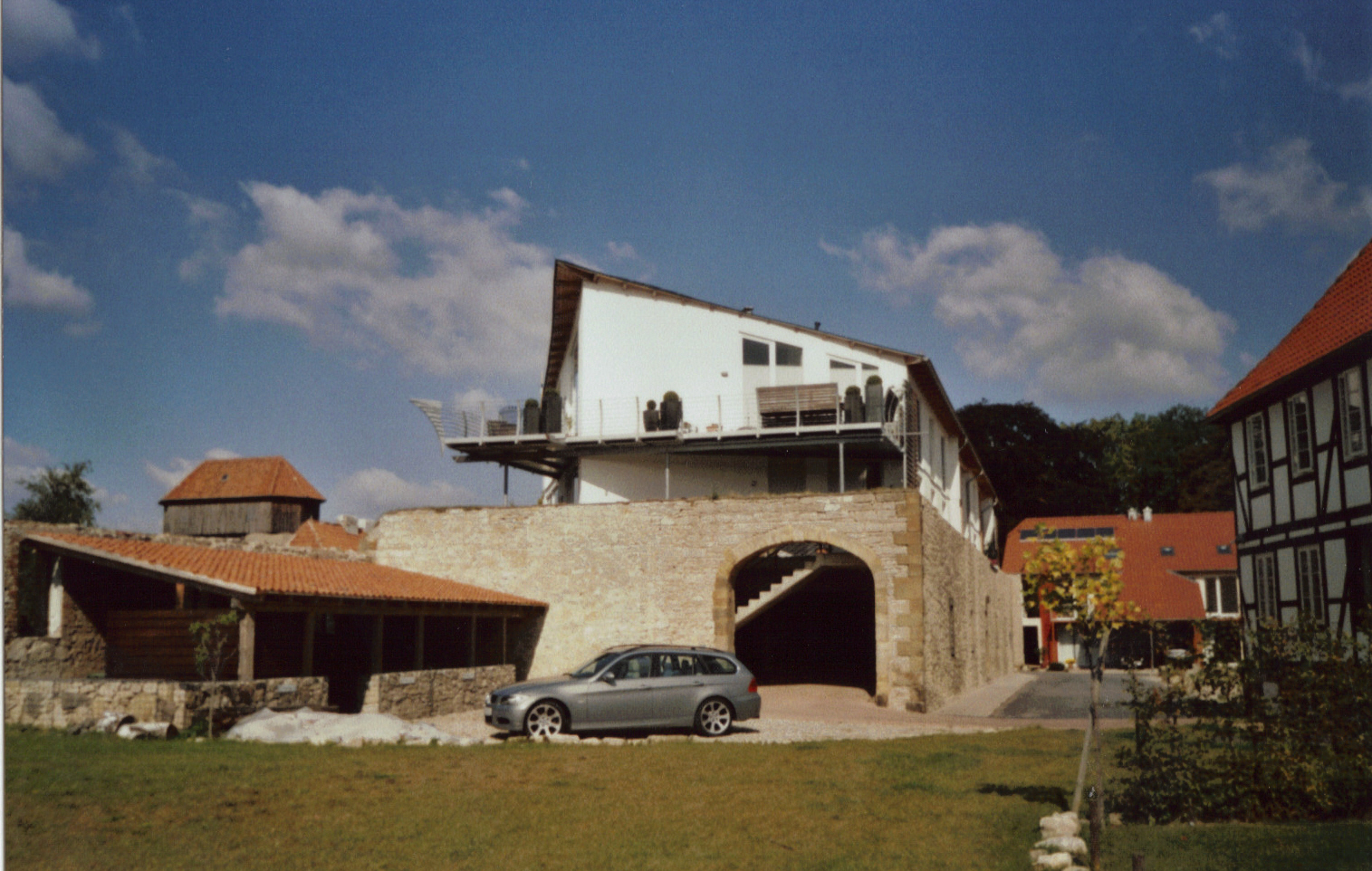
Former domain.

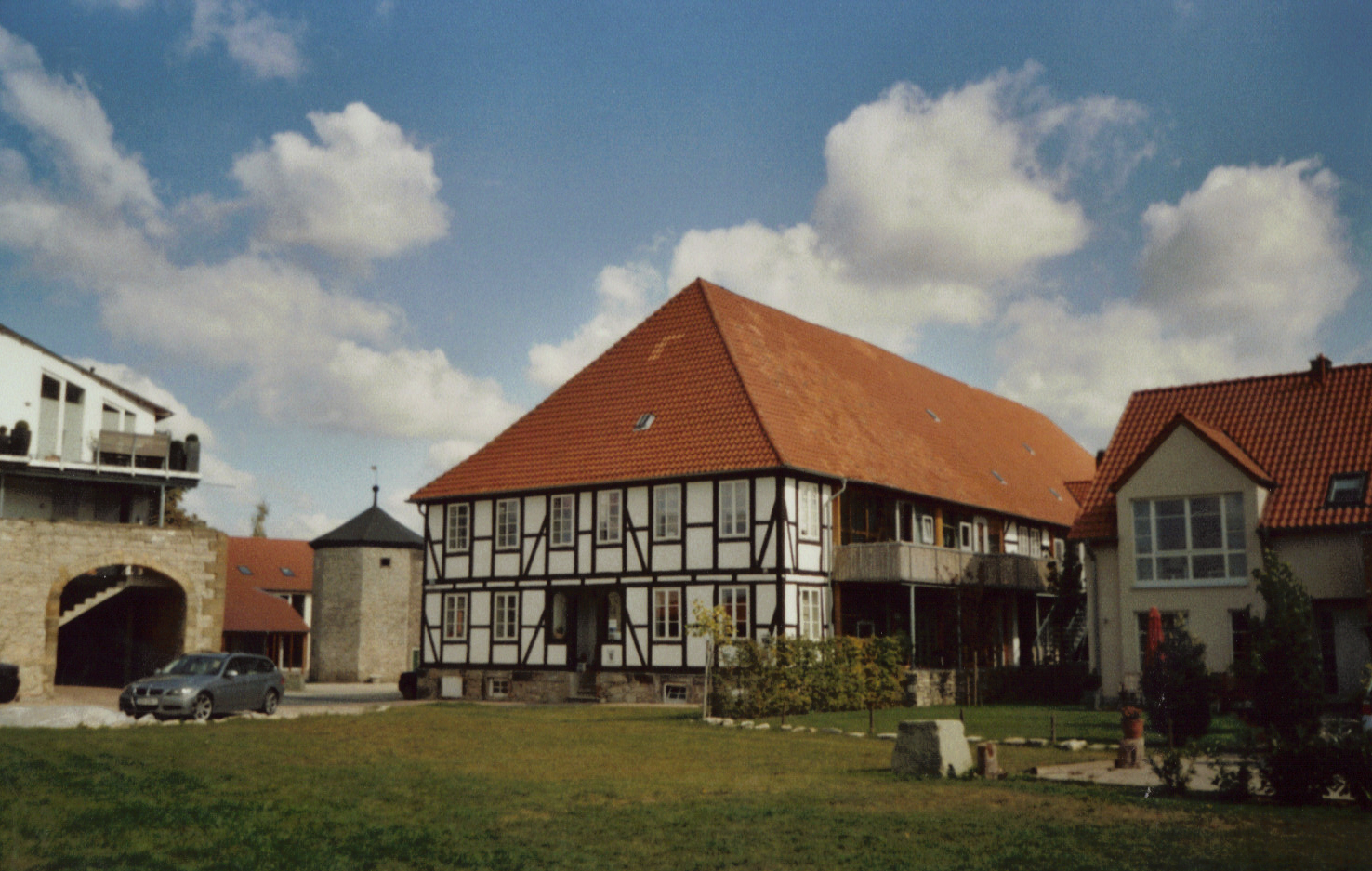
Former domain, manor house.

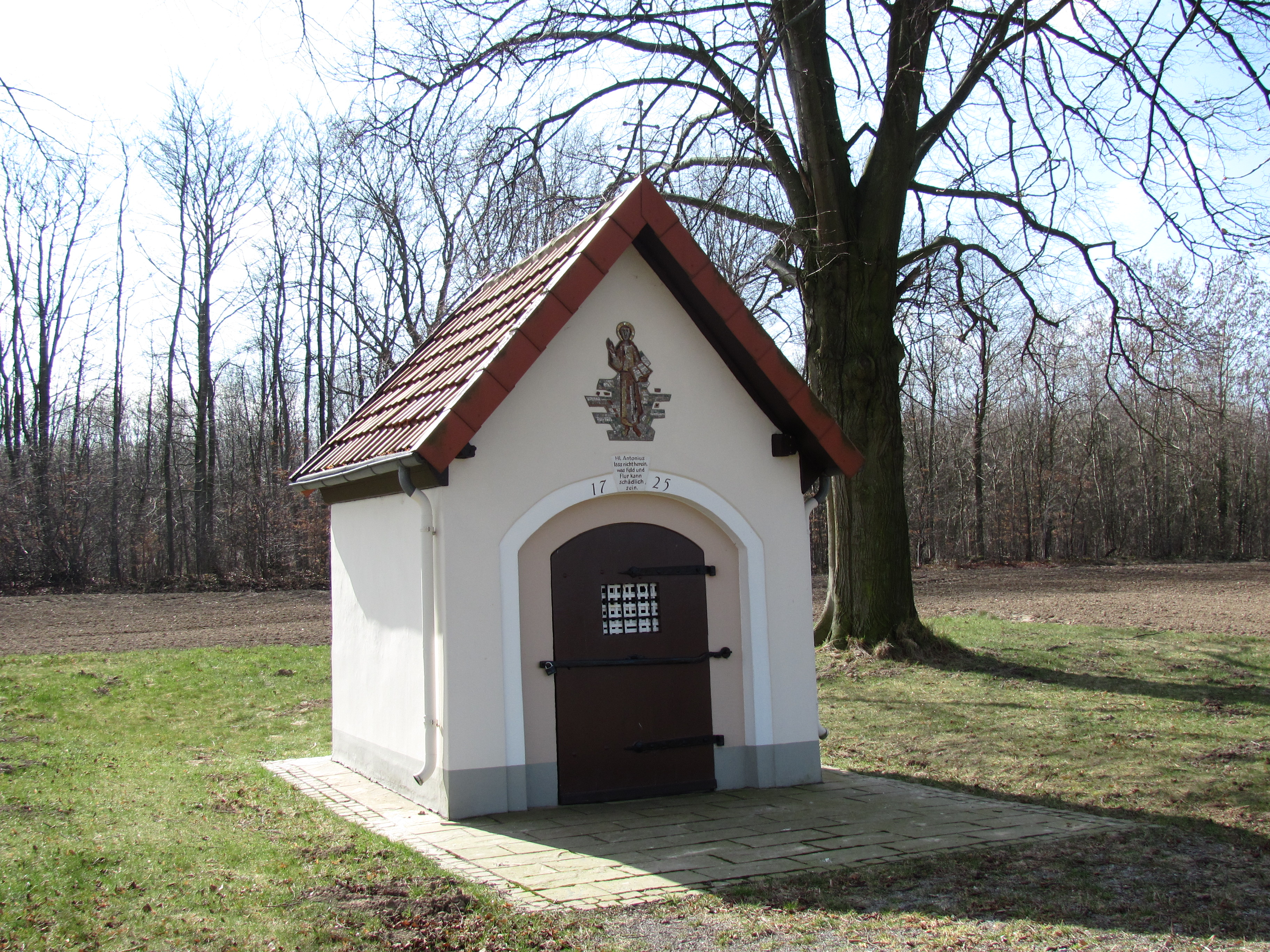
St. Antony's Chapel.
