= Hildesheim =

Hildesheim Hilmessen / Hilmssen (Low German)
- City
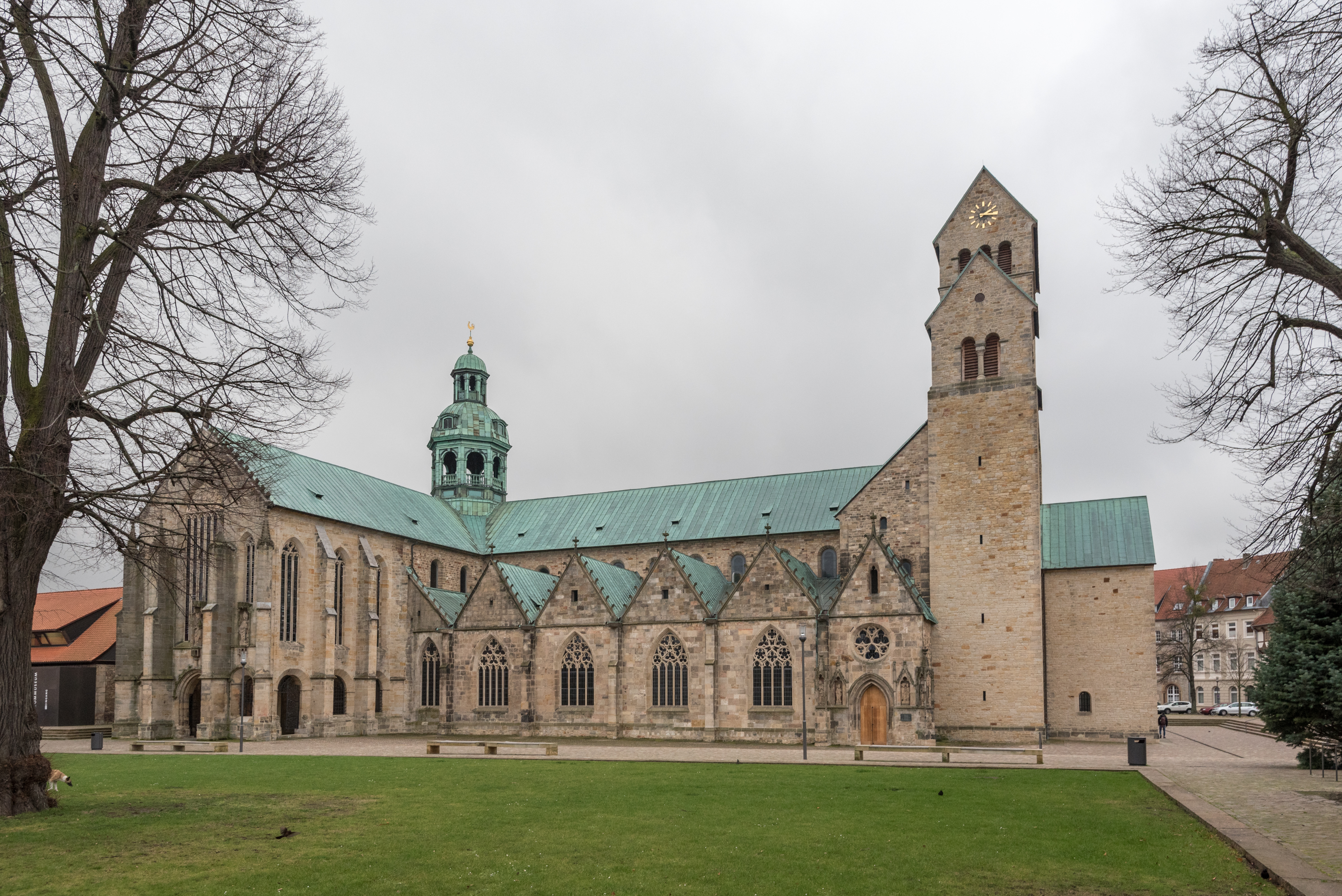
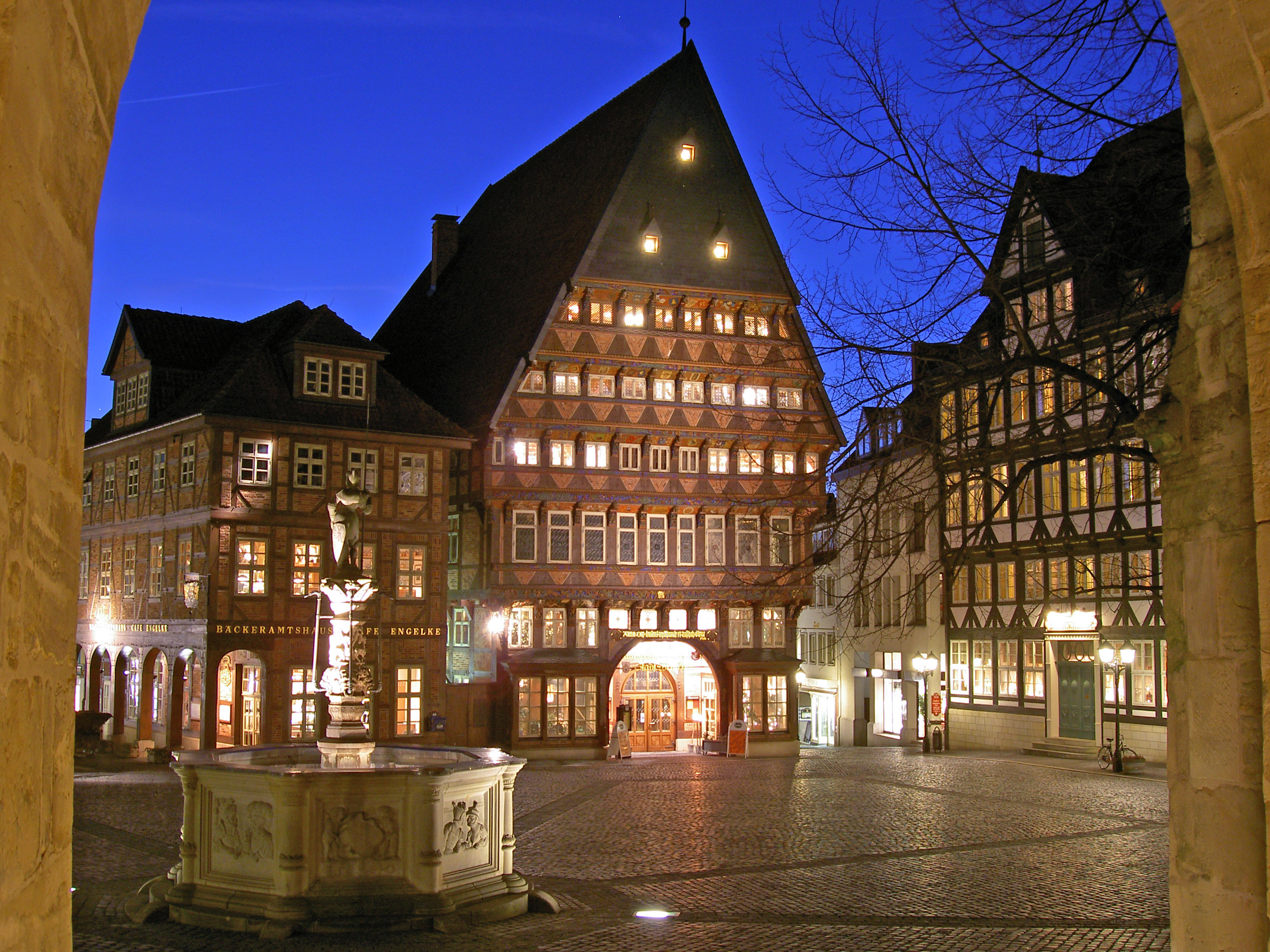
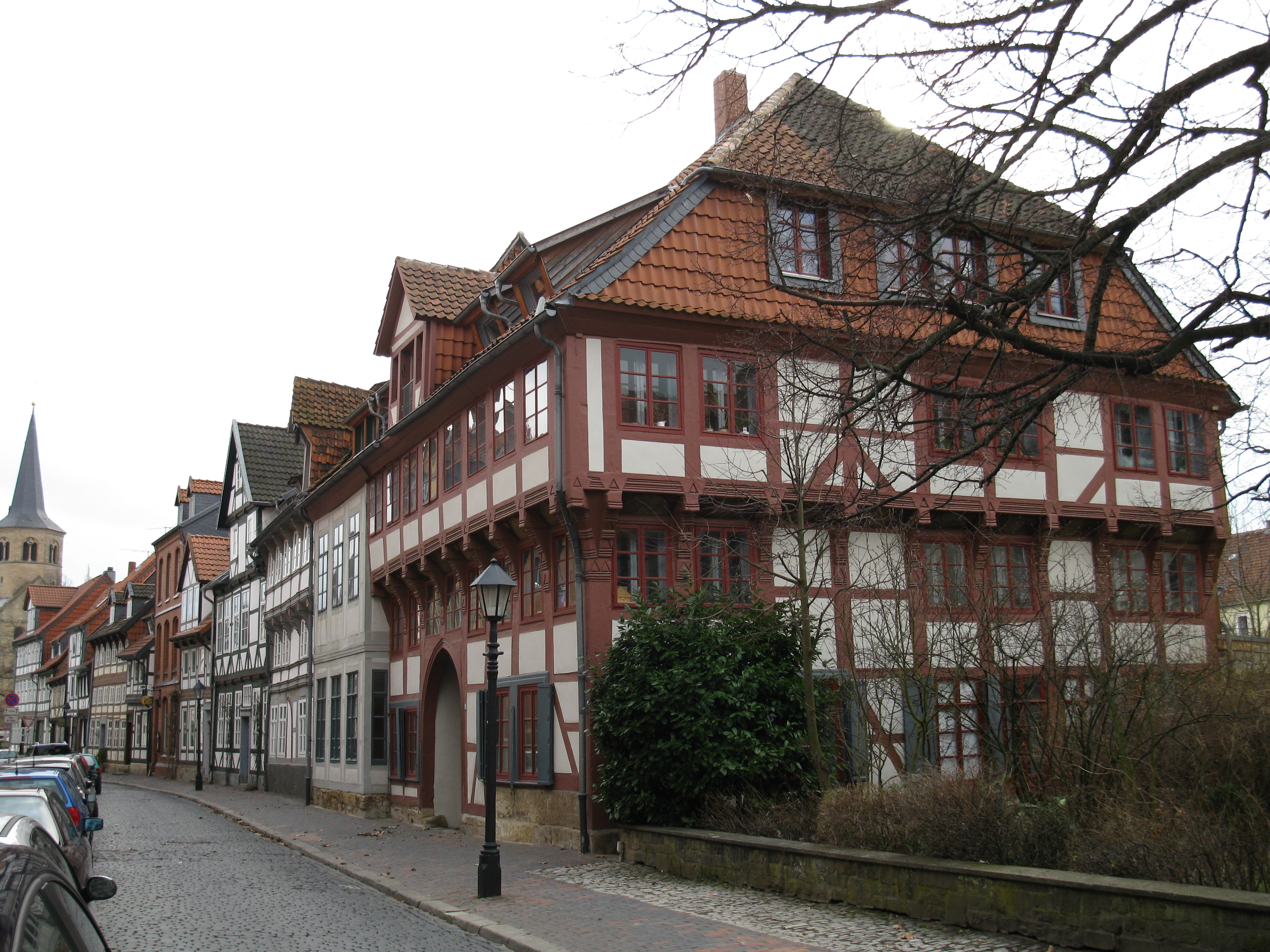
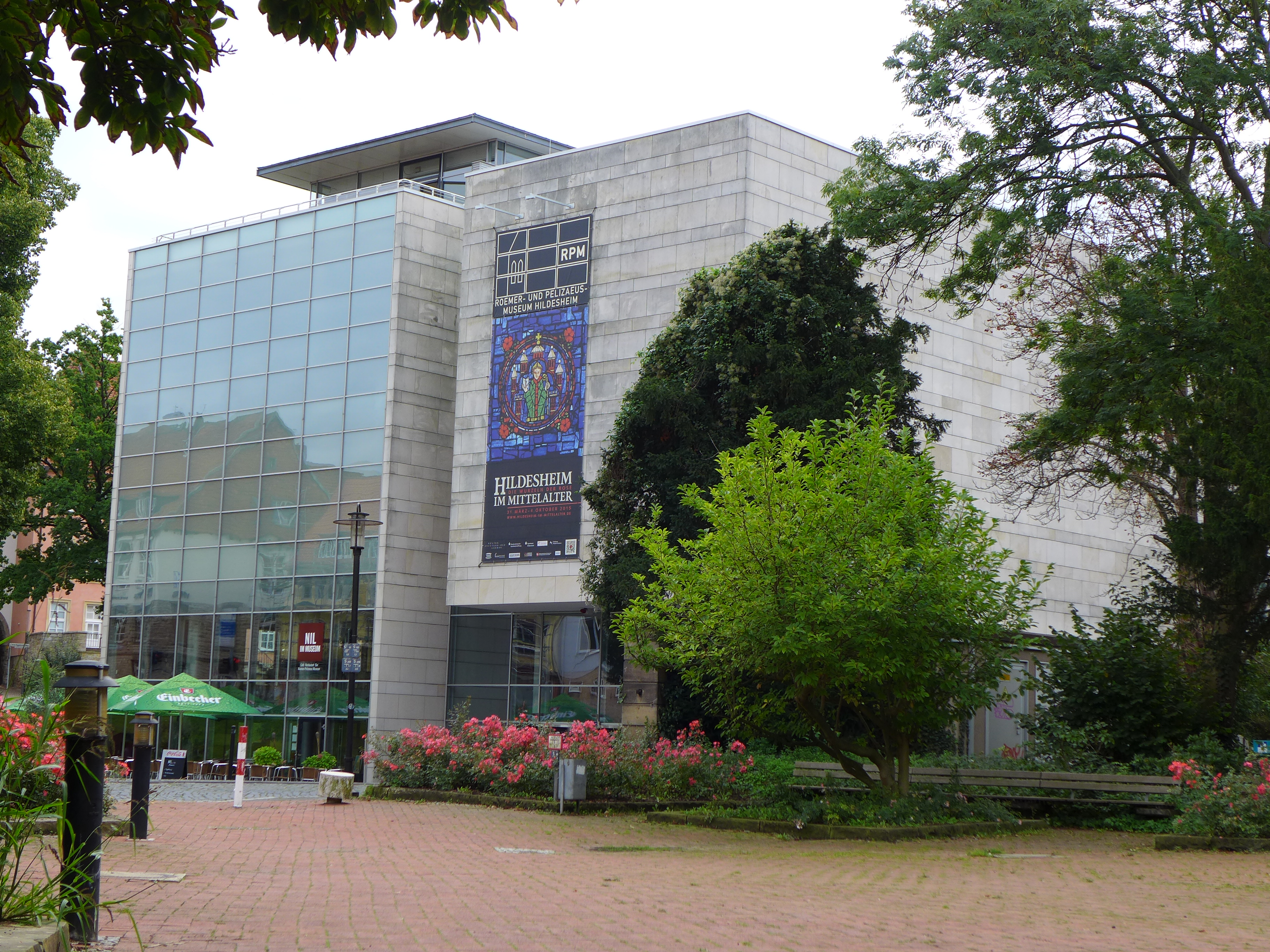
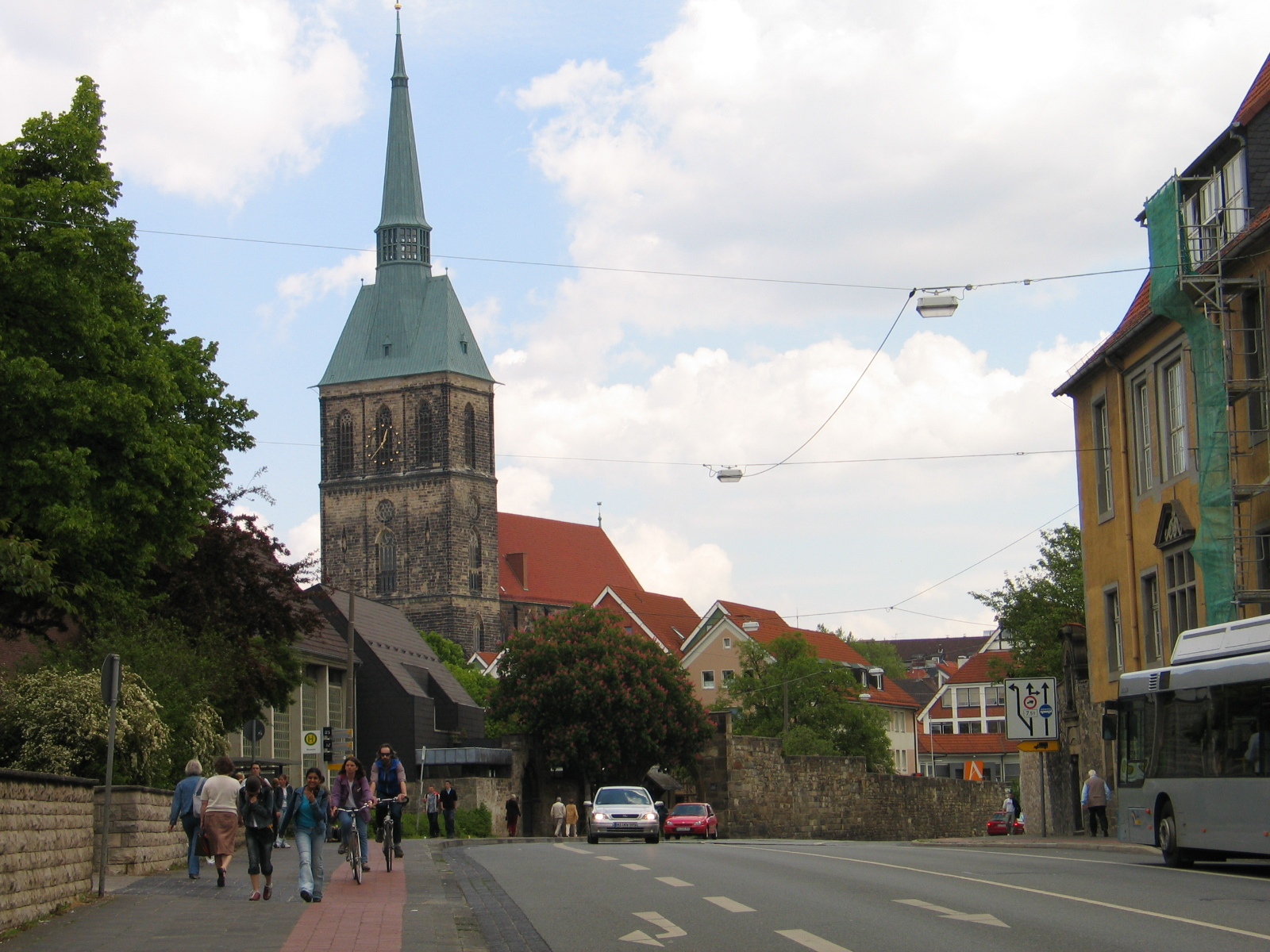
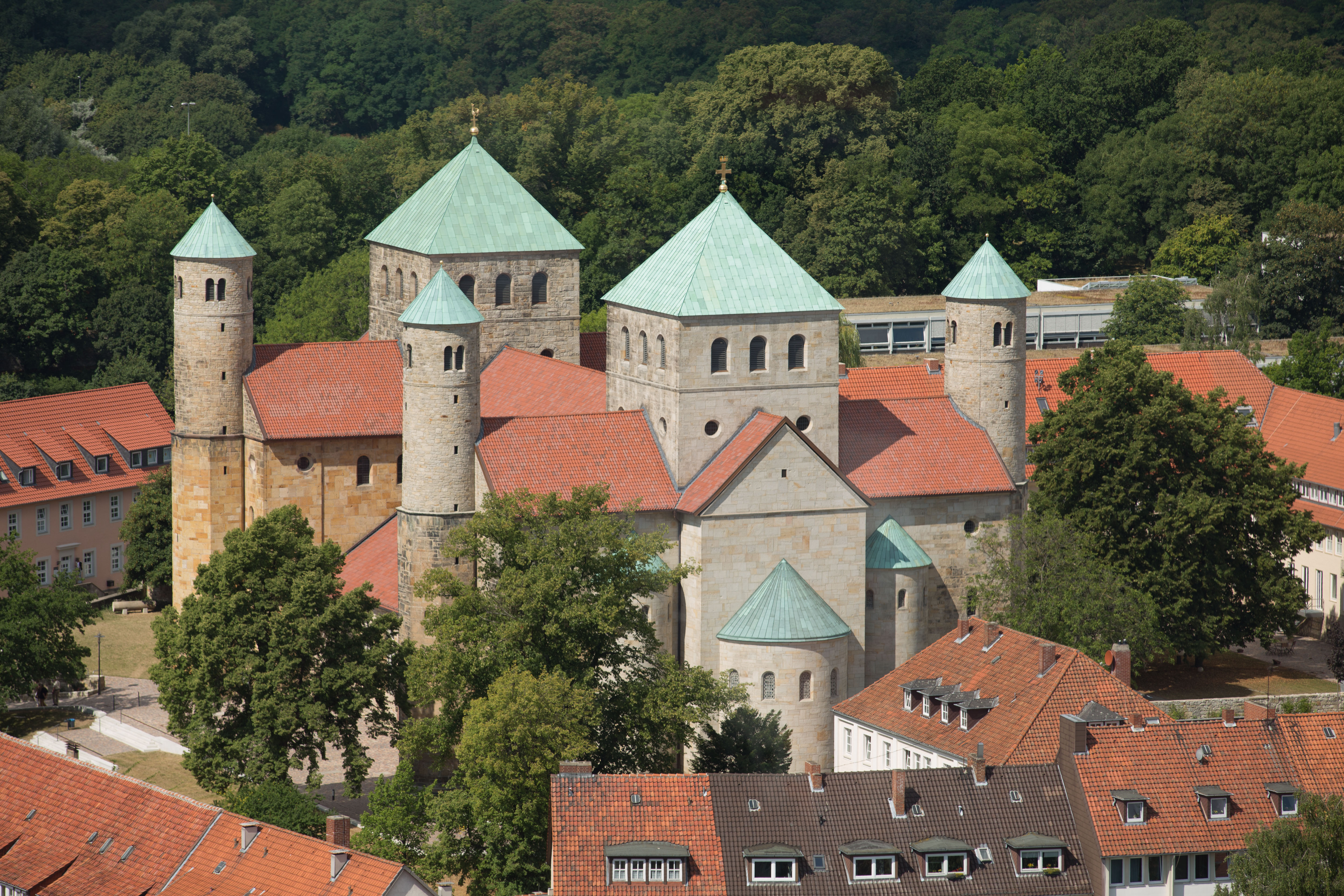
- St. Mary's Cathedral (UNESCO World Heritage Site) Historic Market Place half-timbered houses at the Brühl street Roemer- und Pelizaeus-Museum St. Andrews Church St. Michael's Church (UNESCO World Heritage Site)

- Flag Coat of arms

- Location of Hildesheim within Hildesheim district
- Interactive map of Hildesheim
- Location within Germany Location within Lower Saxony
- Coordinates: 52°09′N 09°57′E
- Country: Germany
- State: Lower Saxony
- District: Hildesheim

Government
  - Mayor (2021–26): Ingo Meyer (Ind.)

Area
  - Total: 92.29 km^{2} (35.63 sq mi)
- Elevation: 81 m (266 ft)

Population (2025-12-31)
  - Total: 98,207
  - Density: 1,064/km^{2} (2,756/sq mi)
- Time zone: UTC+01:00 (CET)
  - Summer (DST): UTC+02:00 (CEST)
- Postal codes: 31134–31141
- Dialling codes: 05121
- Vehicle registration: HI, ALF
- Website: www.hildesheim.de

St Mary's Cathedral and St Michael's Church at Hildesheim
UNESCO World Heritage Site
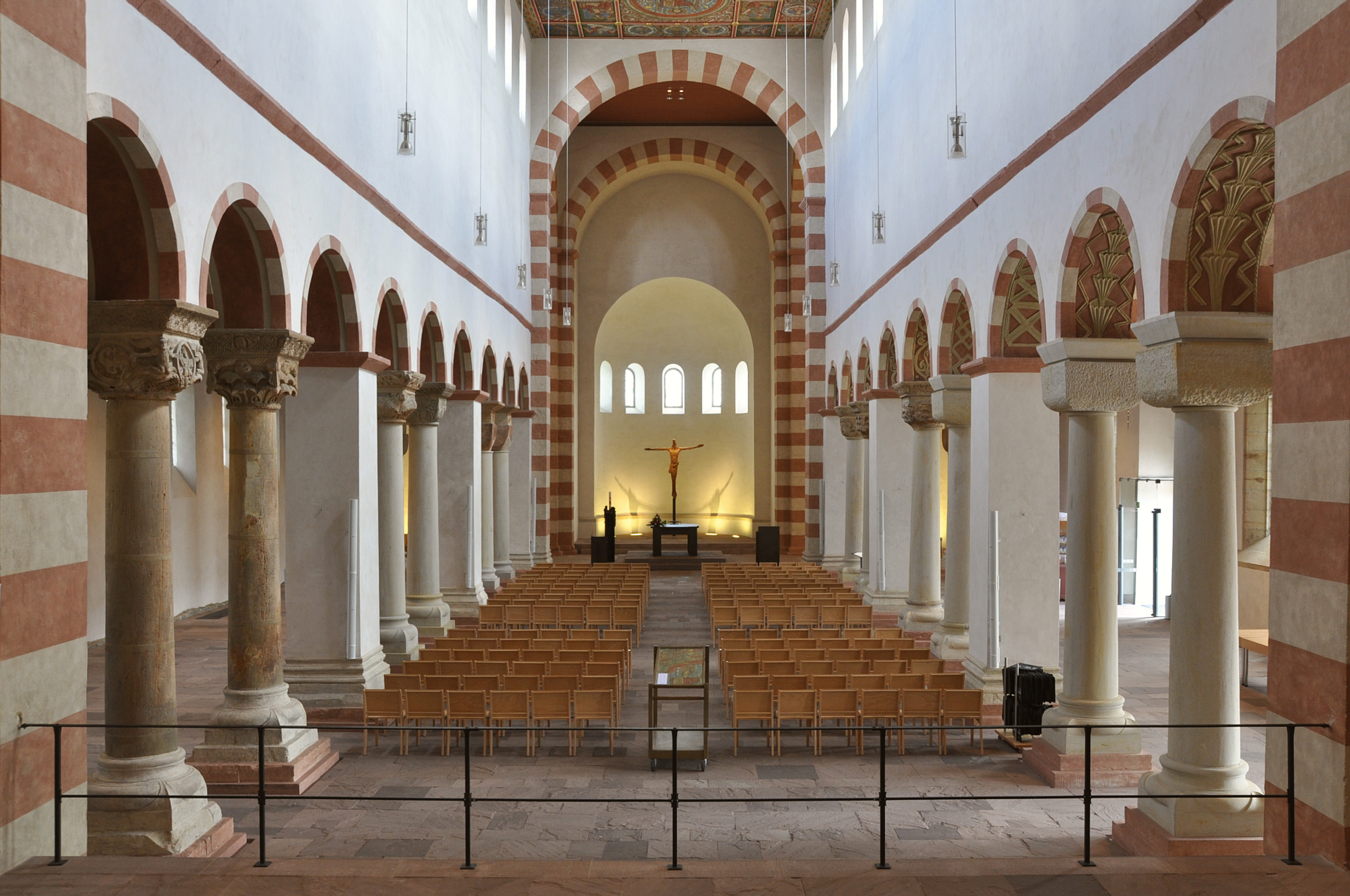
- Ottonian architecture in St. Michael's Church
- Interactive map of St Mary's Cathedral and St Michael's Church at Hildesheim
- Criteria: Cultural: i, ii, iii
- Reference: 187
- Inscription: 1987 (11th Session)
- Area: 0.58 ha (1.4 acres)
- Buffer zone: 157.68 ha (389.6 acres)

Hildesheim (Note: German: [ˈhɪldəsˌhaɪm]; Low German: Hilmessen or Hilmssen; Latin: Hildesia) is a city in Lower Saxony, north-central Germany. With a population of over 100,000, it is located southeast of Hanover on the Innerste river, a tributary of the Leine.

The first settlement was created in 815 by Emperor Louis the Pious, who established the Diocese of Hildesheim. It became a UNESCO World Heritage Site in 1985, and in 2015 the city and diocese celebrated their 1200th anniversary.

== History ==
=== Early years ===
According to tradition, the city was named after its founder Hildwin. The city is one of the oldest cities in Northern Germany, became the seat of the Bishopric of Hildesheim in 815 and may have been founded when the bishop moved from Elze to the ford across the River Innerste, which was an important market on the Hellweg trade route. The settlement around the cathedral very quickly developed into a town and was granted market rights by King Otto III in 983. Originally the market was held in a street called Alter Markt (lit. 'old market') which still exists today. The first marketplace was laid out around the church St. Andreas. When the city grew further, a larger market place became necessary. The present market place of Hildesheim was laid out at the beginning of the 13th century when the city had about 5,000 inhabitants.

=== Middle Ages ===
When Hildesheim obtained city status in 1249, it was one of the biggest cities in Northern Germany. For four centuries the clergy ruled Hildesheim, before a town Hall was built and the citizens gained some influence and independence. Construction of the present Town Hall started in 1268. In 1367 Hildesheim became a member of the Hanseatic League. A war between the citizens and their bishop cost dearly in 1519–23 when they engaged in a feud.

=== Reformation to 17th century ===
Map of Hildesheim (1761)

Hildesheim became Lutheran in 1542, and only the cathedral and a few other buildings remained in Imperial (Roman Catholic) hands. Several villages around the city remained Roman Catholic as well.

During the Thirty Years' War, Hildesheim was besieged and occupied several times: in 1628 and 1632 by imperial troops; and in 1634 by troops from Brunswick and Lüneburg.

=== 19th century ===
In 1813, after the Battle of Leipzig in the Napoleonic Wars, the town became part of the Kingdom of Hanover, which was annexed by the Kingdom of Prussia as a province after the Austro-Prussian War in 1866. In 1868 a highly valuable trove of about 70 Roman silver vessels for eating and drinking, the so-called Hildesheim Treasure, was unearthed by Prussian soldiers.

=== Early 20th century and World War II ===
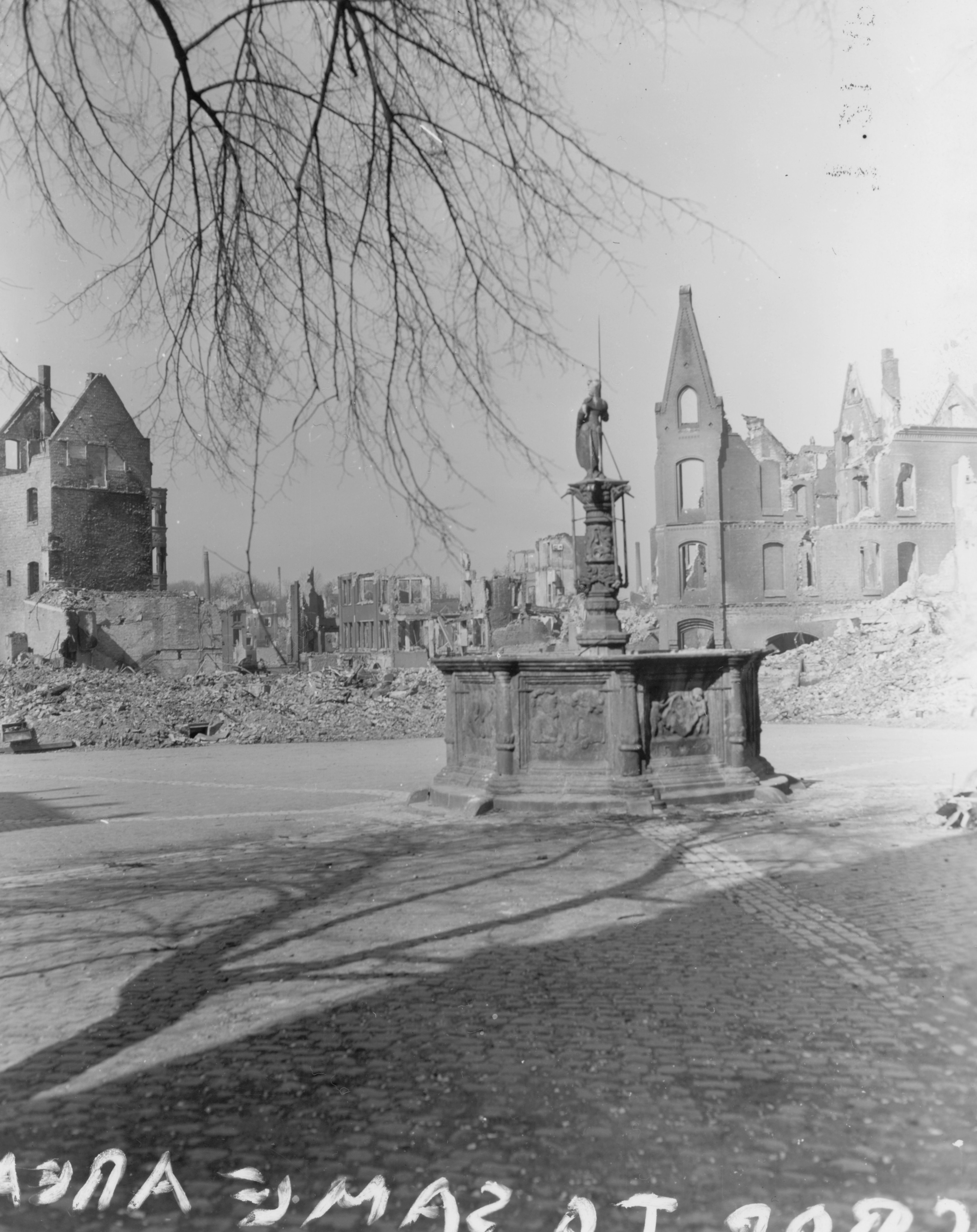
Hildesheim city square in April 1945

Early in World War II, Nazi roundups of the Jewish population began, and hundreds of Hildesheim's Jews were sent to concentration camps. Hildesheim was the location of a forced labour subcamp of the Nazi prison in Celle, and a subcamp of the Neuengamme concentration camp. After the dissolution of the latter, the surviving prisoners were sent on a death march to Ahlem. The city was heavily damaged by British air raids in 1945, especially on 22 March. Although Hildesheim had little military significance, two months before the end of the war the historic city was bombed as part of Britain's Area Bombing Directive in order to undermine German civilian morale. As a result, 29% of the houses were destroyed and 45% damaged, while only 26% of the houses remained undamaged. The centre, which had retained its medieval character until then, was almost leveled. Destruction in the city as a whole was estimated at 20 to 30 percent. Around 200 out of 800 half-timbered framed houses survived.

During the war, valuable world heritage materials had been hidden in underground cellars. After the war and its aftermath, priority was given to rapid building of housing, and concrete structures took the place of the wrecked historic buildings. Most of the major churches – two of them now UNESCO World Heritage sites – were rebuilt in the original style soon after the war.

=== Late 20th century and present ===
In 1978, the University of Hildesheim was founded. In the 1980s a reconstruction of the historic centre began. Some of the unattractive concrete buildings around the market place were torn down and replaced by replicas of the original buildings. In the autumn of 2007, a decision was made to reconstruct the Upended Sugarloaf (Umgestülpter Zuckerhut), an iconic half-timbered house famous for its unusual shape. In 2015 the city and the diocese celebrates their 1200 anniversary with the Day of Lower Saxony.

== Religions ==
In 1542 most of the inhabitants became Lutherans. Today, 28.5% of the inhabitants identify themselves as Roman Catholics (Hildesheim Diocese) and 38.3% as Protestants (Evangelical Lutheran Church of Hanover). 33.0% of the inhabitants are adherents of other religions or do not have a religion at all. Up until 2015 the Serbian Orthodox Bishop of Germany had his seat in Himmelsthür (a locality of Hildesheim), before the seat moved to Frankfurt and, in 2018, to Düsseldorf.

== Main sights ==
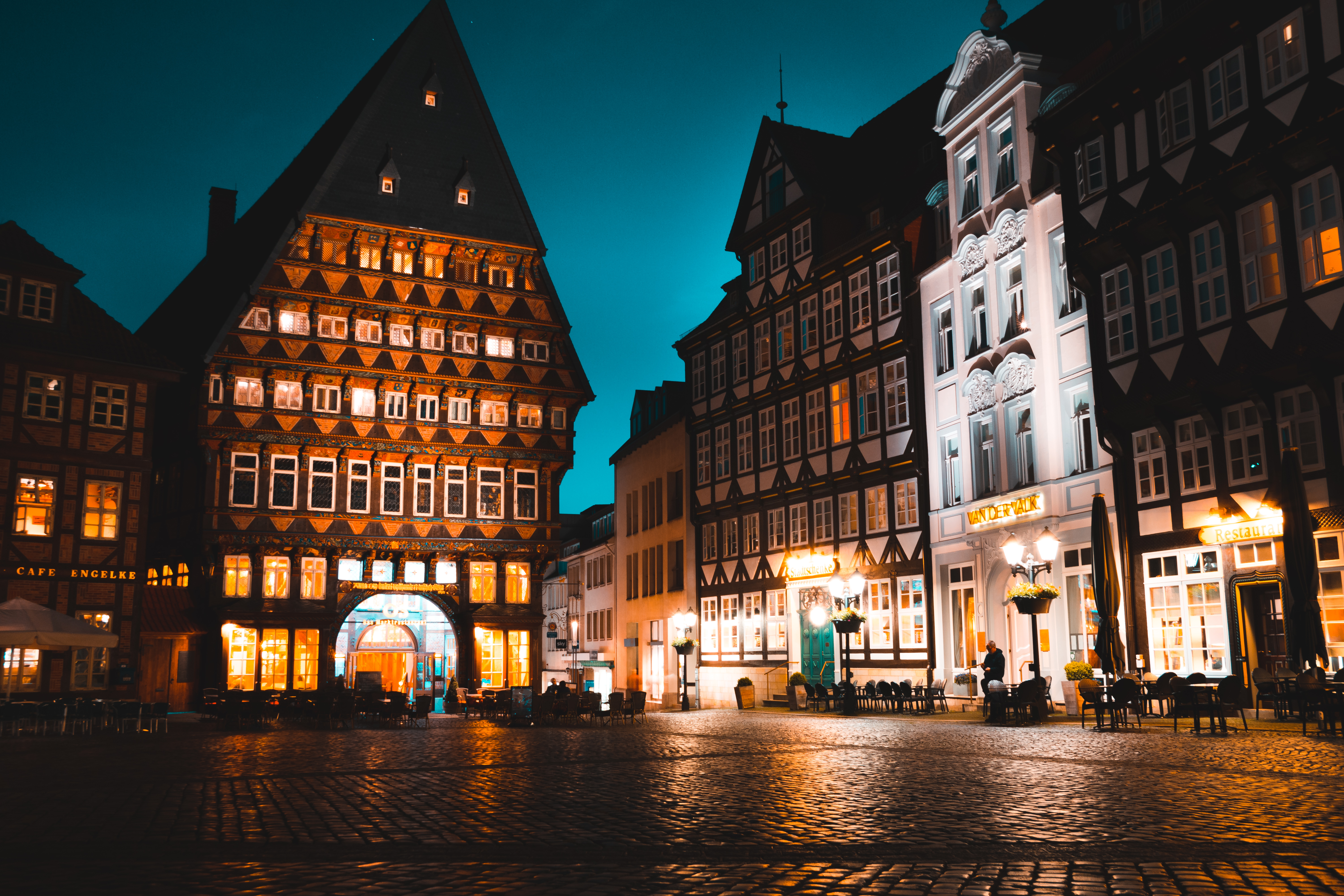
Reconstructed market square at night

- The Marktplatz (historic market place) was reconstructed in 1984–1990 after its destruction in the March 1945 air raid. The more noteworthy buildings in the square are:
  - The Knochenhaueramtshaus (Butchers' Guild Hall), originally built in 1529 and destroyed in 1945, it was reconstructed from 1987 to 1989 according to original plans. The façade is sumptuously decorated with colourful paintings and German proverbs. Today the building houses a restaurant and the City Museum.
  - The Bäckeramtshaus (Bakers' Guild Hall) is a half-timbered house which was originally built in 1825. It was destroyed in 1945 and rebuilt 1987-89. Today, it houses a café.
  - The Town Hall, erected in the 13th century in Gothic style. Partly destroyed in 1945, it was rebuilt and inaugurated in 1954.
  - The Tempelhaus, a late-Gothic 14th-century patrician house, which today houses the tourist information office. It suffered some damage during the Second World War but was restored by 1950.
  - The Wedekindhaus, a 16th-century patrician house, is characterised by its high, ornately carved storeys including their ledges with depictions of allegorical figures.
  - The adjoining Lüntzelhaus was built in 1755 in Baroque style.
  - The Rolandhaus was originally built in the 14th century in Gothic style. In 1730, the house was remodelled, and a Baroque portal and a large bay window were added.
  - The Stadtschänke (Town Tavern) is a large half-timbered house which was originally built in 1666. The smaller adjoining Rococcohaus was built in 1730 in rococo style.
  - The Wollenwebergildehaus (Weavers' Guild Hall) was approximately built in 1600.
- The Romanesque St. Mary's Cathedral (Hildesheim Cathedral), with its ancient bronze doors (Bernward Doors) (c. 1015) and other treasures. The cathedral was built in the 9th century, but almost completely destroyed in 1945; it was reconstructed soon after the war. It has been listed as a UNESCO World Heritage Site since 1985. The "Thousand-year Rose" is a reputedly 1,000‑year‑old dog rose bush, allegedly the world's oldest living rose. It continues to flourish on the wall of the cathedral apse.
  - Museum of the Cathedral: Cathedral Treasure.
- St. Michael's Church (UNESCO World Heritage Site) – an early Romanesque church in Germany and an example of Ottonian architecture. It was built from 1010 to 1022.
- The St. Andreas (St. Andrew's Church), a 12th-century Gothic church with the highest church steeple (114.5 m) in Lower Saxony. Opposite the church stands the Upended Sugarloaf, a half-timbered house dating from 1509.
- The Roemer-und-Pelizaeus-Museum, with collections from ancient Egypt and Peru and special exhibitions.
- The Kreuzkirche (Church of the Holy Cross) was originally a part of the medieval fortifications. It was converted into a church around 1079, severely damaged in 1945 and rebuilt after the war.
- The Romanesque Basilica Minor of St. Godehard (St. Gotthard's Church), built 1133–1172, which is scheduled to become a UNESCO World Heritage Site in the near future. Other notable buildings stand opposite the church: St. Nicolai's Chapel is a former parish church which was built in the Romanesque style in the 12th century and transformed into a residential building after 1803, and the Hospital of the Five Wounds which is a large half-timbered house dating from 1770 with a half-hip roof.
- The church St. Lamberti is a late Gothic building, venue of a weekly concert series at market time.
- The Kehrwiederturm (Kehrwieder Tower), built around 1300, is the only remaining tower of the medieval fortifications.
- Half-timbered houses which were not destroyed during World War II can be seen around St. Godehard and the Kehrwieder Tower, in the streets Keßlerstraße, Knollenstraße, Gelber Stern, Am Kehrwieder, Lappenberg, Brühl, Hinterer Brühl, and Godehardsplatz. Some of them have ornate wood carvings in their façades, e.g. the Wernersches Haus (1606) in Godehardsplatz and the Waffenschmiedehaus (weapon smith house, 1548) at Gelber Stern.
- The church St. Jacobi (St. James' Church) is a 500-year-old pilgrim church in the Gothic style and was one of the many St. James chapels on St. James's Path. Today the church is a culture church with emphasis on literature.
- The Monument of the Synagogue (consecrated in 1849 and destroyed in 1938 during the Kristallnacht) was erected in 1988 in the old Jewish quarter on Lappenberg Street. The foundations were reconstructed to give observers an idea of how large the synagogue was. The reddish brick building (built around 1840) opposite was the Jewish school.
- Mauritiuskirche (St. Maurice's Church), a Romanesque church (11th century) on a hill in the west of the city in the quarter of Moritzberg with a cloister. The interior of the church is Baroque and the tower was added in 1765.
- Kaiserhaus (Emperor's House): Renaissance building (1586) in Alter Markt, the oldest street of Hildesheim, rebuilt after the war. The façade is decorated with Roman statues and medallions. Opposite, there is a noteworthy sandstone bay window dating from 1568. Originally, it belonged to a private house which was torn down at the end of the 19th century. The bay window was dismantled before and added to another house in the eastern part of Hildesheim which remained undamaged during World War II. From there, the bay window was removed when the house was remodelled and added to the school at the present site in 1972.
- Close to the Kaiserhaus (Emperor's house) the Alte Kemenate, a noteworthy medieval store house reaching a height of 5.5 meters, can be seen behind the school in the street Alter Markt. It has a rectangular basis measuring 6.5 meters × 5.0 meters and a cellar with a vaulted construction. The store house, one of the oldest profane buildings in Hildesheim, was built of sandstone in a Gothic style the 15th century. According to other sources it might be even older, i.e. built between the end of the 11th and the middle of the 13th century. The building has two floors. As it did not consist of wood it did not burn down in 1945, but was only damaged and immediately repaired after the war. From 1945 - 1951 it was used for residential purposes. The Alte Kemenate is not open to the public.
- St Magdalena's Church (Magdalenenkirche) is a small church with large lancet windows in the historic street Old Market (Alter Markt) which was consecrated in 1224. It was originally built in a Romanesque style, but enlarged and remodelled in Gothic style in 1456. It houses a wooden altar (about 1520) with carvings and other works of art. The small street Süsternstraße features a well-preserved part of the medieval city wall with a round tower. Opposite the church, a tall half-timbered house which was rebuilt in 1981 on the medieval city wall can be seen in the small side street Mühlenstraße. The façade is decorated with wood carvings.
- Magdalenengarten, a Baroque park which was laid out in 1720–1725, is near St. Magdalena's Church. There are many different kinds of rose bush, a rose museum, pavilions, Baroque statues, a well-preserved part of the medieval city wall in it and even a vineyard yielding 100–200 bottles of wine per year. In spring a rare species of wild yellow tulip (tulipa sylvestris) blossoms in the western part of the park.
- St. Bernward's Church, a neo-Romanesque church built 1905–1907, destroyed in 1945 and rebuilt from 1948 to 1949, houses a Gothic wooden altar retable dating from the beginning of the 15th century.
- A part of the medieval defence system consisting of a wall with moats and ramparts, built around the city in the 13th century, is well preserved. Kalenberger Graben, an artificial lake, is a part of it. It is surrounded by a park. In April a rare species of wild yellow tulip (tulipa sylvestris) blossoms in the park.
- Steuerwald Castle (Burg Steuerwald) in the north of the city, about 3 km (2 mi) from the Market Place, was built 1310–13. Its tower (25 m) was added in 1325. The chapel, dedicated to St Magdalena, was originally built in the Romanesque style and transformed into a Gothic chapel in 1507. Today it is used for weddings and concerts.
- Marienburg Castle (Burg Marienburg) is in the southeast of Hildesheim, about 6 km (4 mi) from the Market Place. It was built 1346–1349.
- Sorsum is a former village in the West of Hildesheim which became a part of the city in 1974. There is a former domain, founded in the Middle Ages, which was transformed into a residential area after 2000. The pigeon tower, built in 1733, the large barn (1786) and the manor house dating from 1734 are the most notable sights in this rural part of Hildesheim.
- Marienrode Priory (Kloster Marienrode) is in the southwest of Hildesheim, about 6 km (4 mi) from the Market Place. It was founded in 1125. The foundation stone of the present church was laid in 1412. The church was built in Gothic style with three naves and completed in 1462. The Baroque ridge turret was added in the 18th century. In the church, there are two noteworthy Baroque altars dating from 1750 approximately and a Gothic sandstone sculpture of Saint Mary which was made in 1460. The organ dates from the middle of the 18th century. A small chapel of the priory, Saint Cosmas and Damian, which was built in 1792, was converted into a small Protestant church in 1830. The priory was dissolved in 1806, but returned to the Catholic Church in 1986. Since 1988, it has again been operated by nuns. Near the monastery there is a large fishpond with a tall windmill built in 1839.

Other places of interest include the theatre, offering opera, operetta and musicals, drama, ballet and concerts.

== Incorporations ==
- 1911: Moritzberg
- 1912: Steuerwald
- 1938: Drispenstedt and Neuhof
- 1971: Ochtersum
- 1974: Achtum-Uppen, Bavenstedt, Einum, Himmelsthür, Itzum, Marienburg, Marienrode and Sorsum

== Demographics ==
=== Population history ===
On 31 Dec 2017 Hildesheim had 103,970 inhabitants.

Historical population
Year	Pop.	±%
1400	6,000	—
1450	8,000	+33.3%
1648	5,500	−31.2%
1803	11,108	+102.0%
1825	12,630	+13.7%
1849	14,651	+16.0%
1871	20,801	+42.0%
1875	22,581	+8.6%
1890	33,481	+48.3%
1900	42,973	+28.4%
1910	50,239	+16.9%
1919	53,499	+6.5%
1925	58,522	+9.4%
1933	62,519	+6.8%
1939	72,101	+15.3%
1950	65,531	−9.1%
1961	96,296	+46.9%
1970	93,400	−3.0%
1975	106,000	+13.5%
1980	102,700	−3.1%
1985	100,900	−1.8%
1989	103,512	+2.6%
1997	105,700	+2.1%
2002	103,448	−2.1%
2013	100,708	−2.6%
2015	101,667	+1.0%
2017	103,970	+2.3%
2019	101,693	−2.2%

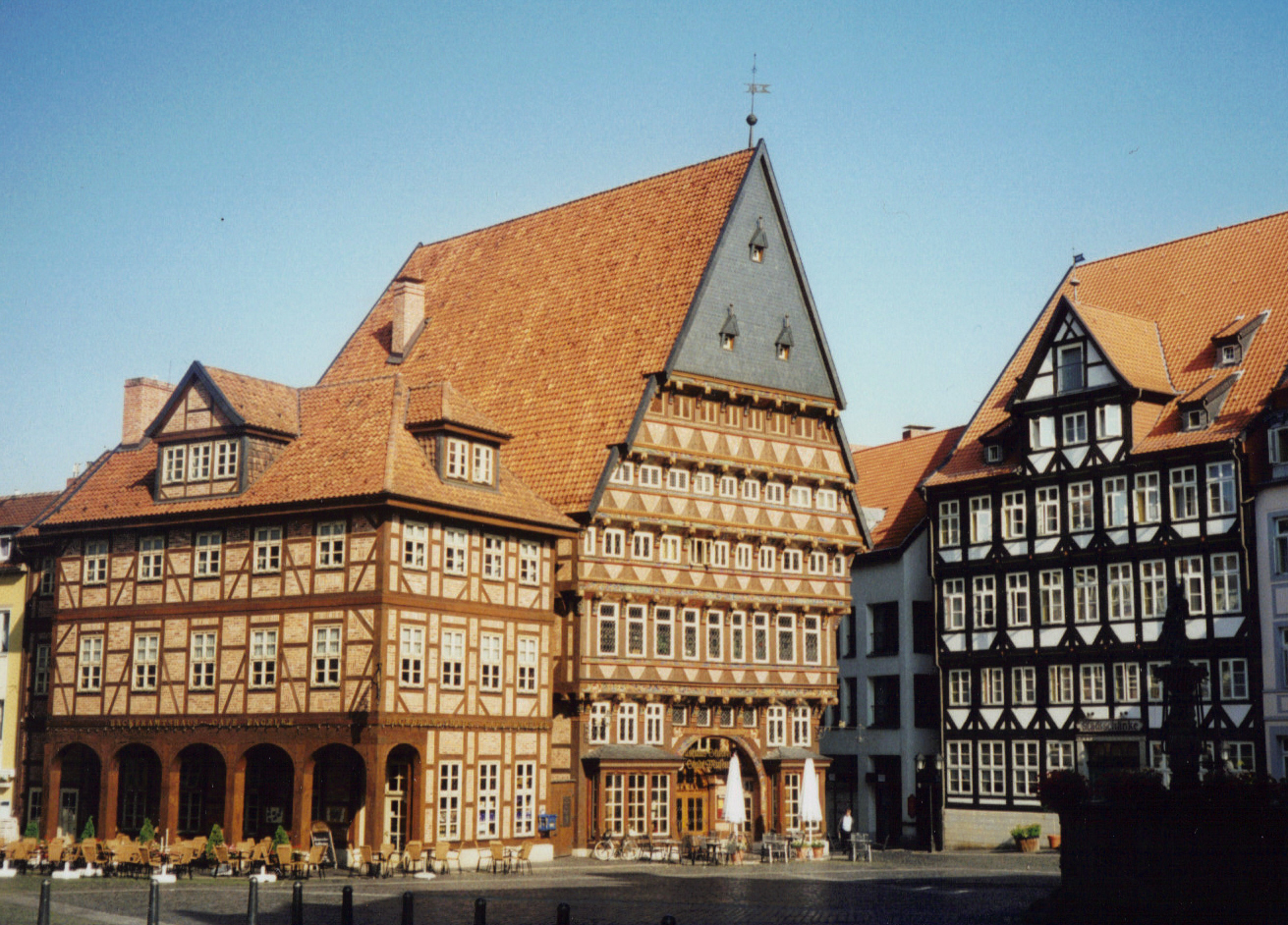
Bakers' Guild Hall and Butchers' Guild Hall in the Market Place.

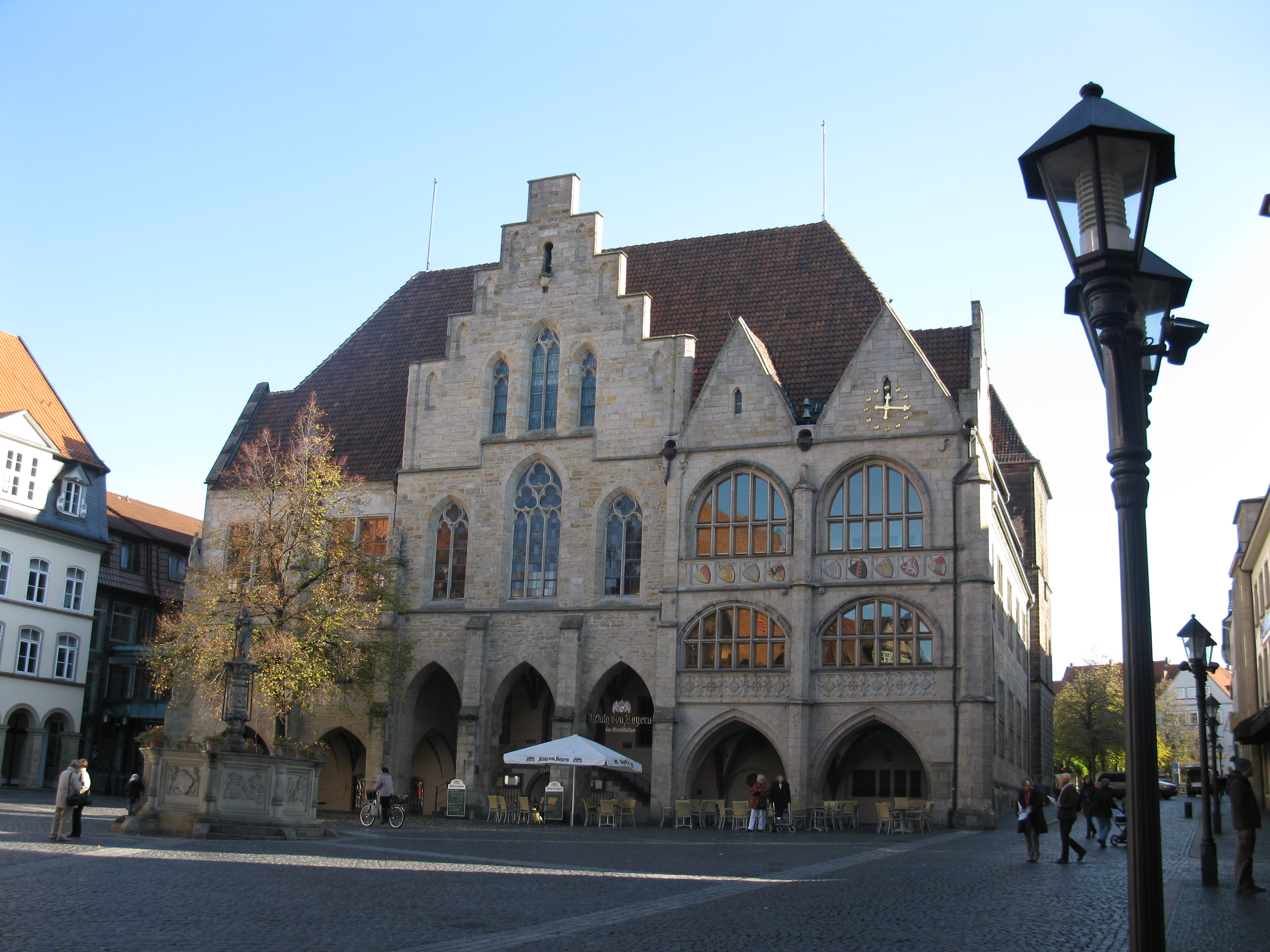
Historic Market Place with City Hall and market fountain.

=== Largest minority groups ===
The following list shows the largest foreign groups in the city of Hildesheim as of 2013:

Rank	Nationality	Population (2016)
1	Turkey	2,395
2	Poland	764
3	Serbia	474
4	Italy	442
5	Iraq	299
6	Syria	268
7	Russia	254
8	Bulgaria	243

== Twin towns – sister cities ==
Hildesheim is twinned with:

- Angoulême, France (1965)
- Minya, Egypt (1975)
- Weston-super-Mare, England, United Kingdom (1983)
- Gelendzhik, Russia (1992)
- North Somerset, England, United Kingdom (1997)
- Pavia, Italy (2000)

== Events of international interest ==
- M'era Luna Festival, Europe's most important event of the gothic and wave scene
- "Jazztime" festival on the weekend of Pentecost (in May or June)

== Economy ==
Important and significant companies in the city of Hildesheim are:

- Robert Bosch Car Multimedia
- St. Bernward Hospital
- Helios Hospital
- Sparkasse Hildesheim
- KSM Castings Group
- Petrofer Chemie H. R.
- Optimal Personal & Organisation
- Medifox DAN
- Howmet Aerospace

== Transport ==
Hildesheim has an efficient traffic infrastructure: it is a regional hub for national roads and railway (Hildesheim Hauptbahnhof is served by InterCityExpress services), is connected to the motorway (Autobahn), has a harbour on the Mittellandkanal (canal) and Hildesheim Betriebsgesellschaft Airfield.

There is no airport in the city with the nearest airport, Hannover Airport, located 48 km (30 mi) north of Hildesheim.

== Education ==
There are many secondary schools (Gymnasiums, comprehensive schools and subject-specific secondary schools): Gymnasium Andreanum, Gymnasium Marienschule, Gymnasium Josephinum Hildesheim, Scharnhorstgymnasium Hildesheim, Goethegymnasium Hildesheim, Michelsenschule, Gymnasium Himmelsthür. Further: Freie Waldorfschule Hildesheim, Robert-Bosch-Gesamtschule. Friedrich-List-Schule (Fachgymnasium Wirtschaft), Herman-Nohl-Schule (Fachgymnasium Gesundheit und Soziales), Walter-Gropius-Schule (Berufsbildende Schule), Werner-von-Siemens-Schule (Fachgymnasium Technik), Elisabeth-von-Rantzau-Schule (Fachakademie für Sozialmanagement).

Tertiary Education can be achieved at the University of Hildesheim or Hochschule für angewandte Wissenschaft und Kunst (HAWK), a co-operation with the cities of Holzminden and Göttingen.

== Culture ==
The community has the headquarters of the Serbian Orthodox Eparchy of Frankfurt and all of Germany.

== People ==
=== Public service and public thinking ===
- Gotthard of Hildesheim (960–1038), Roman Catholic saint
- Bernward of Hildesheim (960–1022), Bishop of Hildesheim
- Leo of Vercelli (ca 965–1026), prelate who served as the Bishop of Vercelli from 999
- Benno of Meissen (ca 1010–1106), named Bishop of Meissen in 1066, canonized in 1523.
- Adelog of Hildesheim (died 1190), Bishop of Hildesheim from 1171 to 1190
- John of Hildesheim (ca 1310–1375), Carmelite friar and writer
- Didrik Pining (1430–1491), explorer of the North Atlantic & privateer
- Eva von Trott (1505–1567), the royal mistress of Henry V, Duke of Brunswick-Lüneburg, from 1522 until 1567.
- Christoph Daniel Ebeling (1741–1817), scholar who studied the geography and history of North America.
- Frederick Hornemann (1772–1801), German African explorer.
- Philip Marheineke (1780–1846), Protestant church leader.
- Christian August Brandis (1790–1867), philologist and historian of philosophy.
- Moritz Güdemann (1835–1918), an Austrian rabbi, historian and Chief rabbi of Vienna.
- Henry Rathbone (1837–1911), US Consul, committed to an asylum for the criminally insane after murdering his wife
- Jakob Guttmann (1845–1919), chief rabbi locally, 1874 and 1892 and philosopher
- Adolf Bertram (1859–1945), German Roman Catholic bishop and cardinal
- Julius Guttmann (1880–1950), German and Israeli rabbi, Jewish philosopher and historian
- Wilhelm Koppe (1896–1975), Obergruppenführer and General der Waffen-SS und Polizei
- Harald Freiherr von Elverfeldt (1900–1945), a general in the Wehrmacht during World War II
- Karl Hamann (1903–1973), 1948–51 chairman of the LDPD and minister
- Wolfram Sievers (1905–1948), Nazi war criminal and director of Ahnenerbe, executed for war crimes
- Stefan Schostok (born 1964), politician, Mayor of Hanover from 2013 to 2019.
- Andreas Bovenschulte (born 1965), politician, mayor of Bremen since 2019
- Mauritius Wilde (born 1965), a Benedictine monk, priest, professor, podcaster, spiritual director and author.
- Hubertus Heil (born 1972), politician (SPD) & Govt. minister
- Prince Ernst August of Hanover (born 1983), hereditary Prince of Hannover
- Christian von Hanover (born 1985) a German prince in pretense

=== Artists ===
- Börries von Münchhausen (1874-1945), poet and writer
- Wilhelm Schmidthild (1876–1951), painter, graphic artist, illustrator and art professor.
- Erich Pommer (1889–1966), film producer
- Eberhard Schlotter (1921–2014), painter and graphic artist
- Guy Stern (born 1922), American literary critic and honorary citizen of the city
- Lily Franz (1924–2011), a Sinti writer, lived locally
- Hans Raffert (1927–2005), chef, he was White House Executive Chef from 1988 to 1992.
- Rudolf Schenker (born 1948), guitarist and founding member of the hard rock band Scorpions
- Bernd Clüver (1948–2011), crooner, sang The boy with the harmonica
- Michael Schenker (born 1955), German rock guitarist, founding member of the Scorpions and of the band UFO
- Thomas Quasthoff (born 1959), German bass-baritone singer
- Twins Wolfgang and Christoph Lauenstein (born 1962), winners of an Academy Award in 1989 for their film Balance
- Petra Hartmann (born 1970), novelist, journalist and author.
- Diane Kruger (born 1976), supermodel and actress, who played Helen in the film Troy
- Joana Mallwitz (born 1986), conductor and pianist.

=== Science and business ===
- Ludolph van Ceulen (1540–1610), a German-Dutch mathematician he emigrated to the Netherlands.
- Catharina Helena Dörrien (1717–1795), botanist
- Johann Heinrich Friedrich Link (1767–1851), naturalist and botanist.
- Friedrich Adolph Roemer (1809–1869), geologist.
- Ferdinand von Roemer (1818–1891), geologist.
- Adolf Hurwitz (1859–1919), mathematician, worked on algebra, analysis, geometry and number theory.
- Heinrich Nordhoff (1899–1968), engineer, Chairman of Volkswagen and key figure in the VW Beetle's history
- Sir Hans Adolf Krebs FRS (1900–1981), physician and biochemist, Physiology and Medicine in 1953
- Oskar Schindler (1908–1974), German industrialist, died in Hildesheim, Righteous Among the Nations, about whom the book Schindler's Ark was written; see also the film Schindler's List
- Fuad El-Hibri (1958–2022), a German-American businessman and philanthropist, founded Emergent BioSolutions

=== Sport ===
- Wolfgang Danne (born 1941), figure skater, team bronze medallist at the 1968 Winter Olympics
- Björn Schnake (born 1971), Paralympic table tennis player, team bronze medallist at the 2020 Summer Paralympics
- Maik Taylor (born 1971), Northern Ireland and Birmingham City footballer, played 502 games and 88 for Northern Ireland
- Sara Harstick (born 1981), freestyle swimmer, bronze medallist at the 2000 and 2004 Summer Olympics

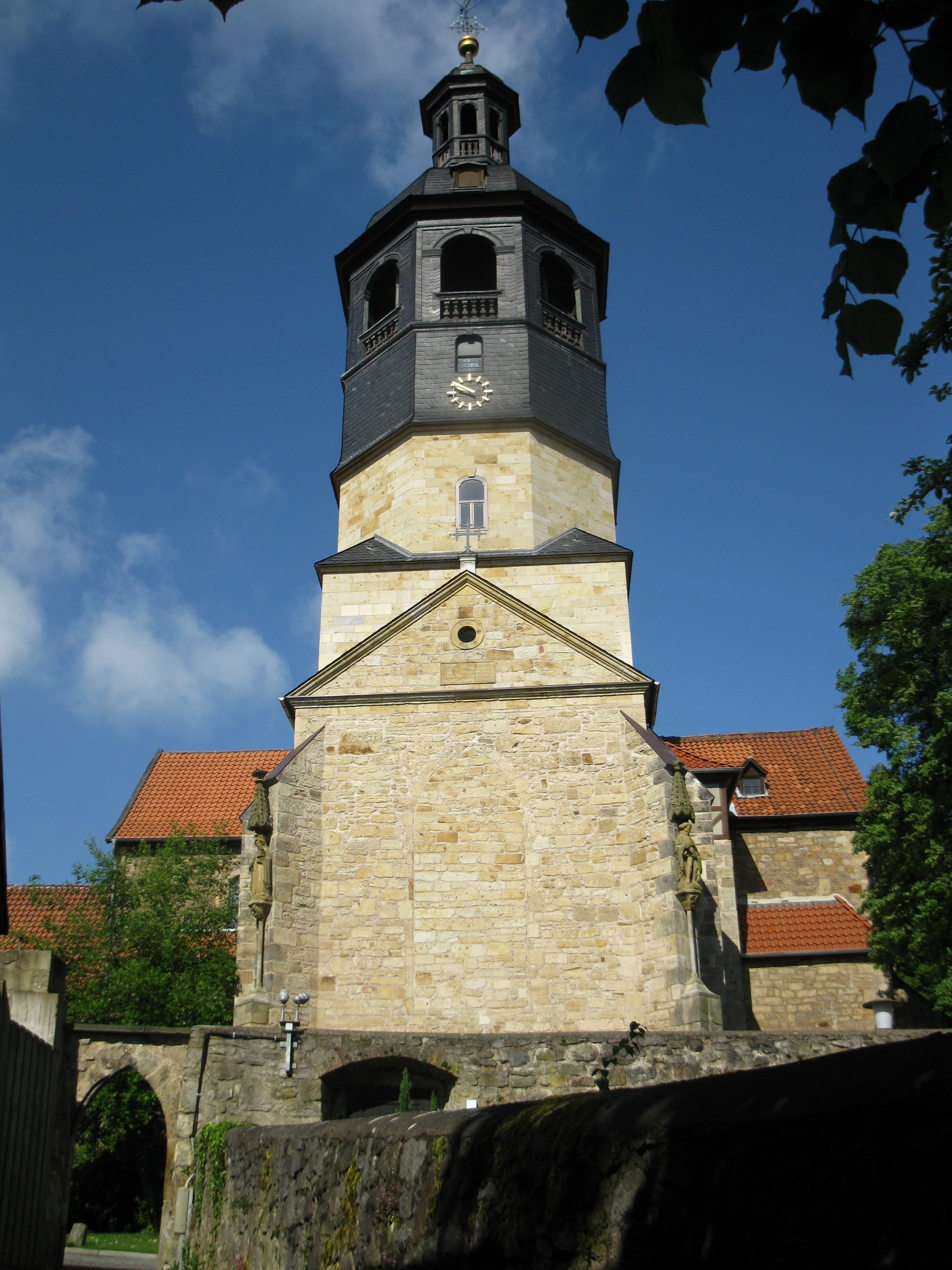
St. Mauritius Church.

== See also ==
- Metropolitan region Hannover-Braunschweig-Göttingen-Wolfsburg
