= Day of Lower Saxony =

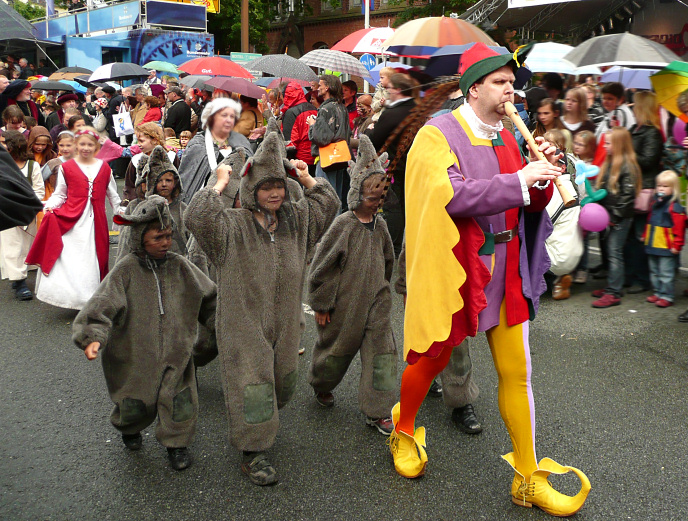
The Pied Piper of Hamelin in 2009 in Hamelin

The Day of Lower Saxony (German: Tag der Niedersachsen or TdN) is a three-day, cultural state festival in the German state of Lower Saxony, which has taken place annually since 1981. The venue is always a different Lower Saxon town.

== Aim ==
At the festival, the participants present the cultural diversity of the state, displaying them to a large audience. The event is intended to be a place where young and old can meet. Other purposes of the TDN are to reinforce awareness of the state, to encourage citizens to identify with their own state and to increase their sense of belonging to Lower Saxony. The TDN automatically promotes the reputation of Lower Saxony, and also helps to raise the profile of each host town. Long term, the local organizers hope to gain from a revival of tourism.

== Venues ==
- 1981: Celle
- 1982: Aurich
- 1983: Wolfsburg
- 1984: Hann. Münden
- 1985: Verden an der Aller
- 1986: Hamelin
- 1987: Lingen (Ems)
- 1988: Uelzen
- 1989: Goslar
- 1990: Stade
- 1991: Rinteln
- 1992: Helmstedt
- 1993: Emden
- 1994: Munster
- 1995: Oldenburg
- 1996: Wolfenbüttel
- 1997: Nienburg
- 1998: Meppen
- 1999: Bückeburg
- 2000: Peine
- 2001: Lüneburg
- 2002: Northeim
- 2003: Leer
- 2004: Holzminden
- 2005: Wolfsburg
- 2006: Melle
- 2007: Cuxhaven
- 2008: Winsen (Luhe)
- 2009: Hamelin
- 2010: Celle
- 2011: Aurich
- 2012: Duderstadt
- 2013: Goslar Vienenburg and in Kloster Wöltingerode
- 2014: Hanover (Day of German Unity also held in Hanover)
- 2015: Hildesheim (1,200th anniversary of the town)
- 2017: Wolfsburg
- 2019: Wilhelmshaven

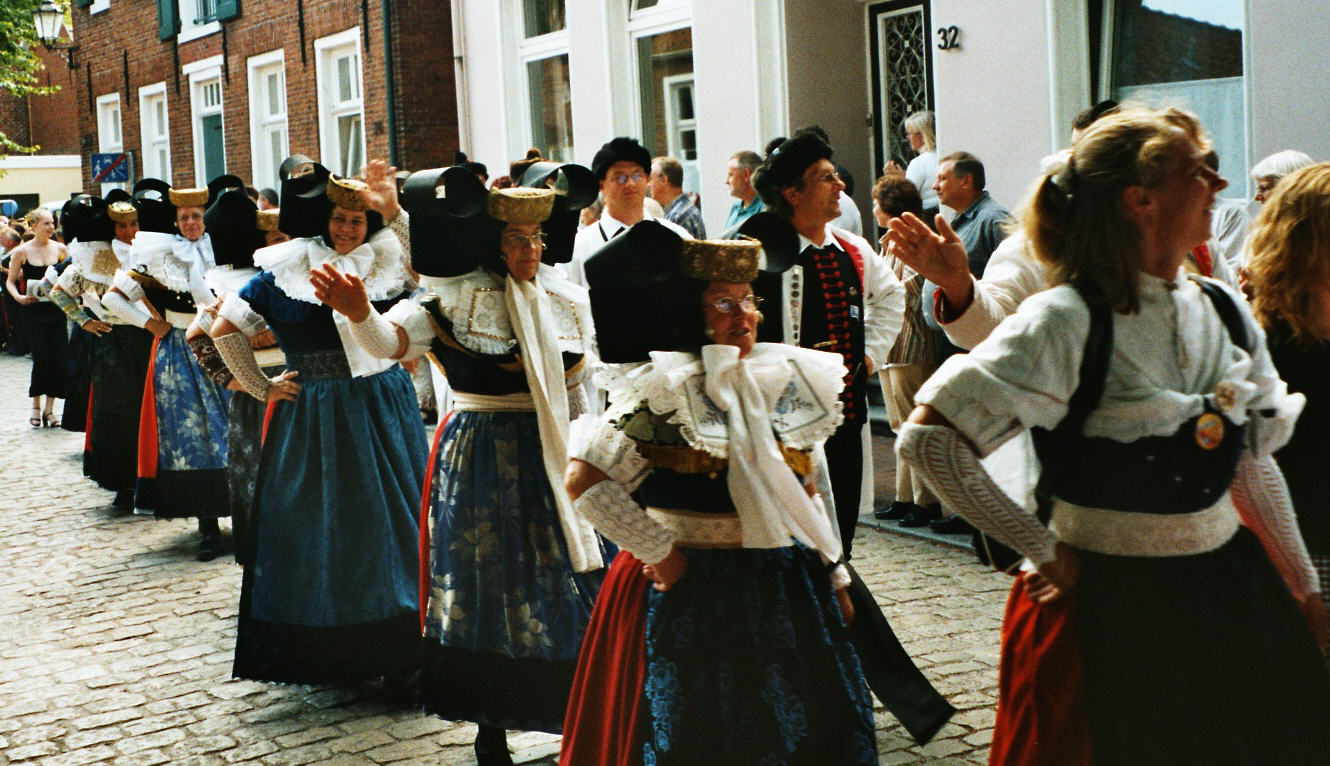
Leer 2003: Parade in traditional costumes

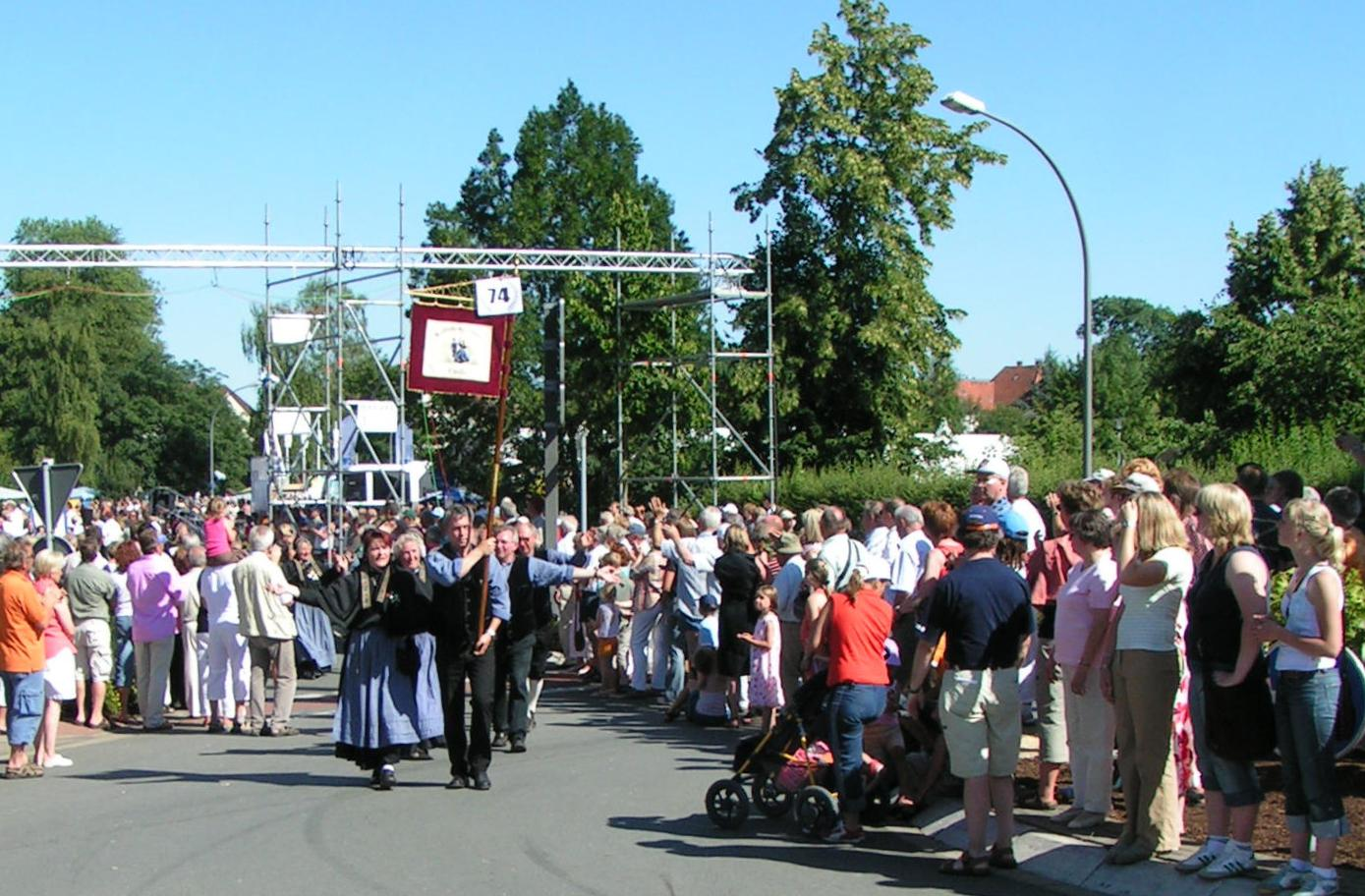
Melle 2006: Parade in traditional costumes

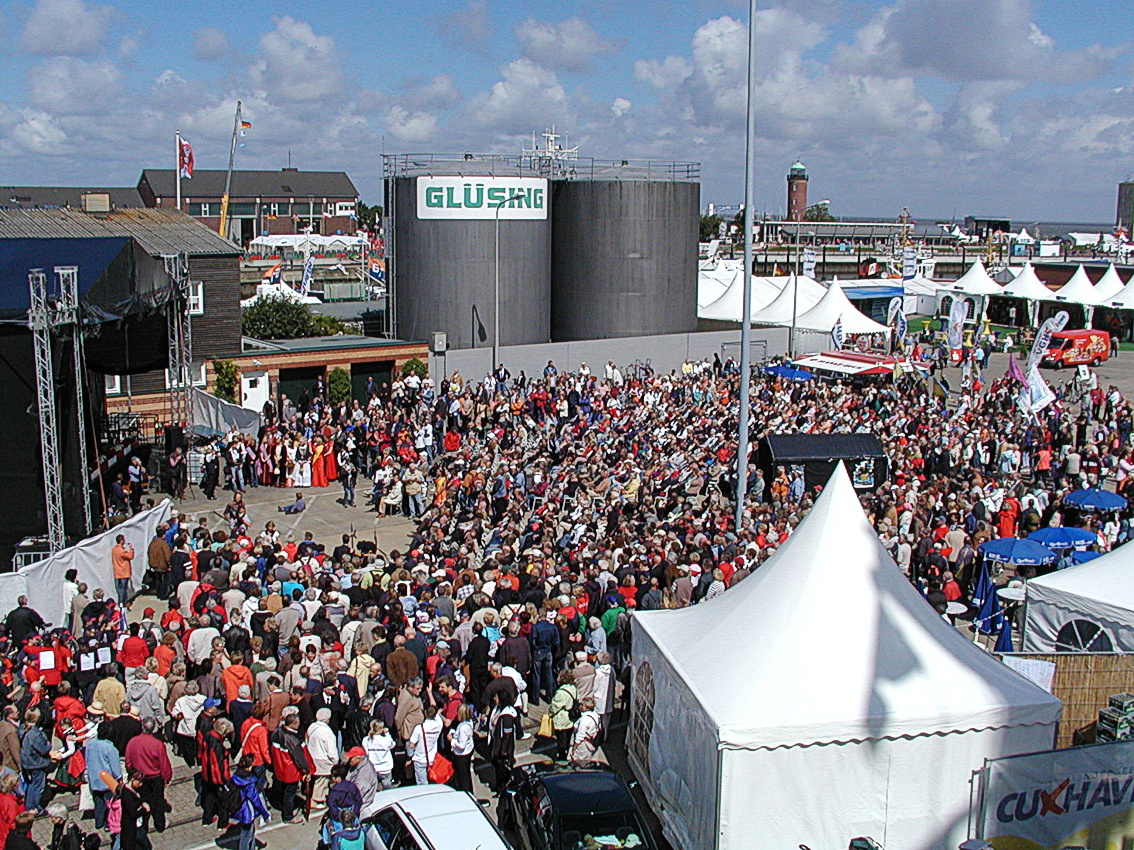
Cuxhaven 2007: People gathering for the opening

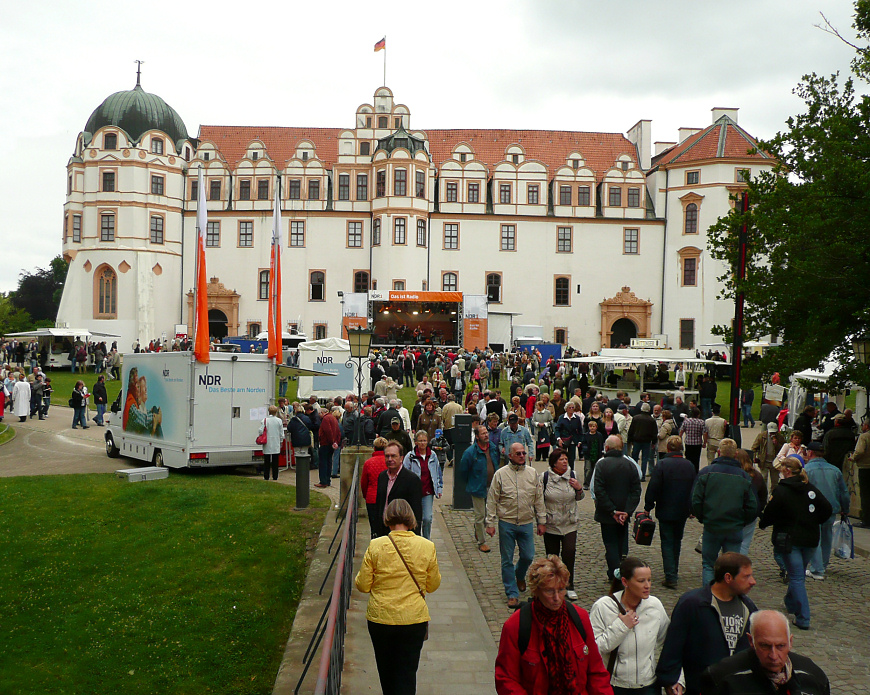
Celle 2010: Visitors in front of Celle Castle
