= Butchers' Guild Hall, Hildesheim =

Timber framed house in Hildesheim, Germany

Coordinates: 52.1528°N 9.95139°E

The Butchers' Guild Hall (German: Knochenhaueramtshaus) is a half-timbered house in Hildesheim in the federal state of Lower Saxony, Germany.

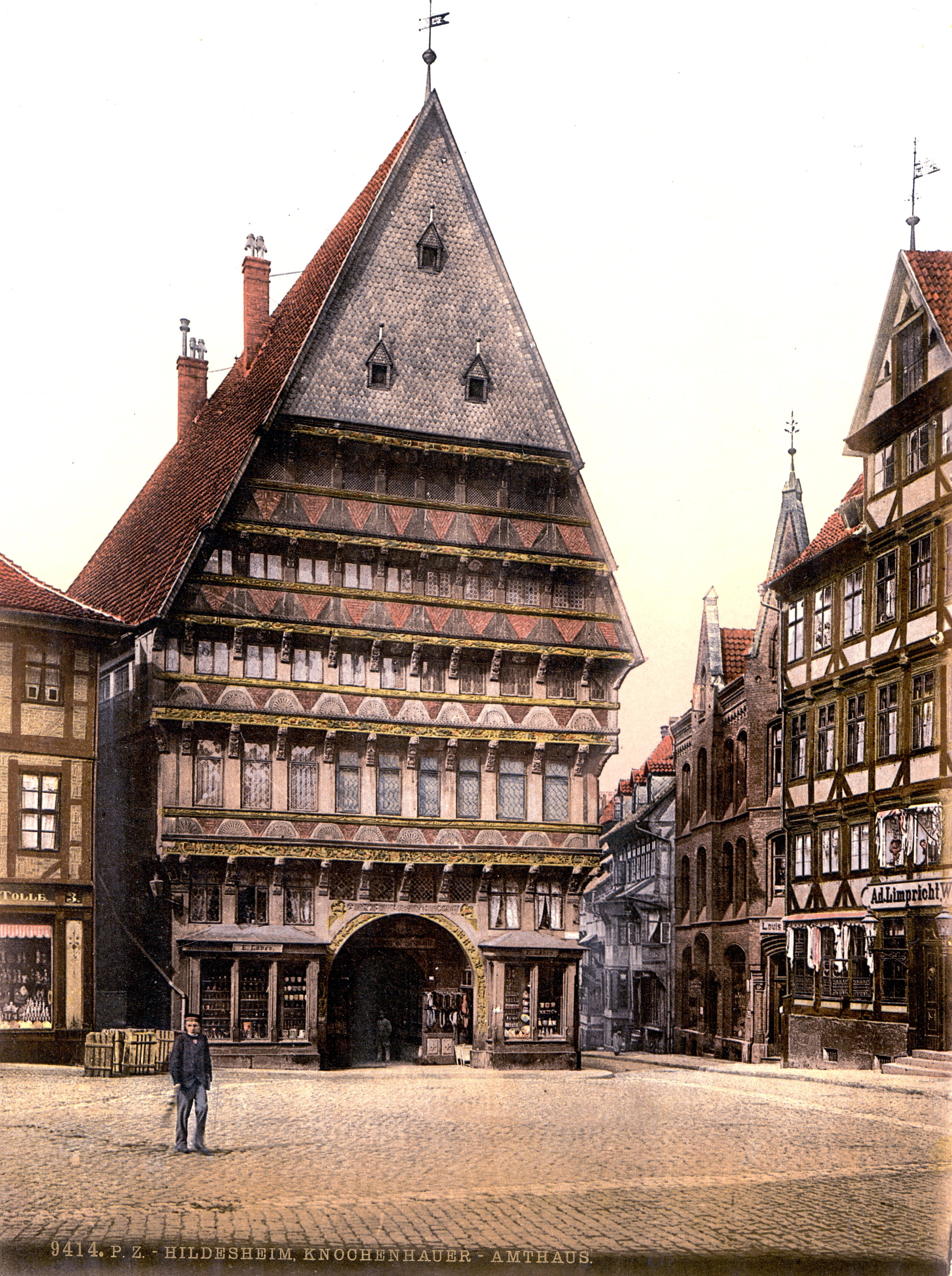
Butchers' Guild Hall before being bombed in World War II.

Today the reconstructed Butchers' Guild Hall houses a restaurant and the City Museum. Every year, a traditional Christmas Market is held in front of the Butchers' Guild Hall. It starts in the last week of November and runs through to Christmas Eve. Traditional products and handicrafts, Christmas merchandise, and local delicacies are offered.

== History and architecture ==
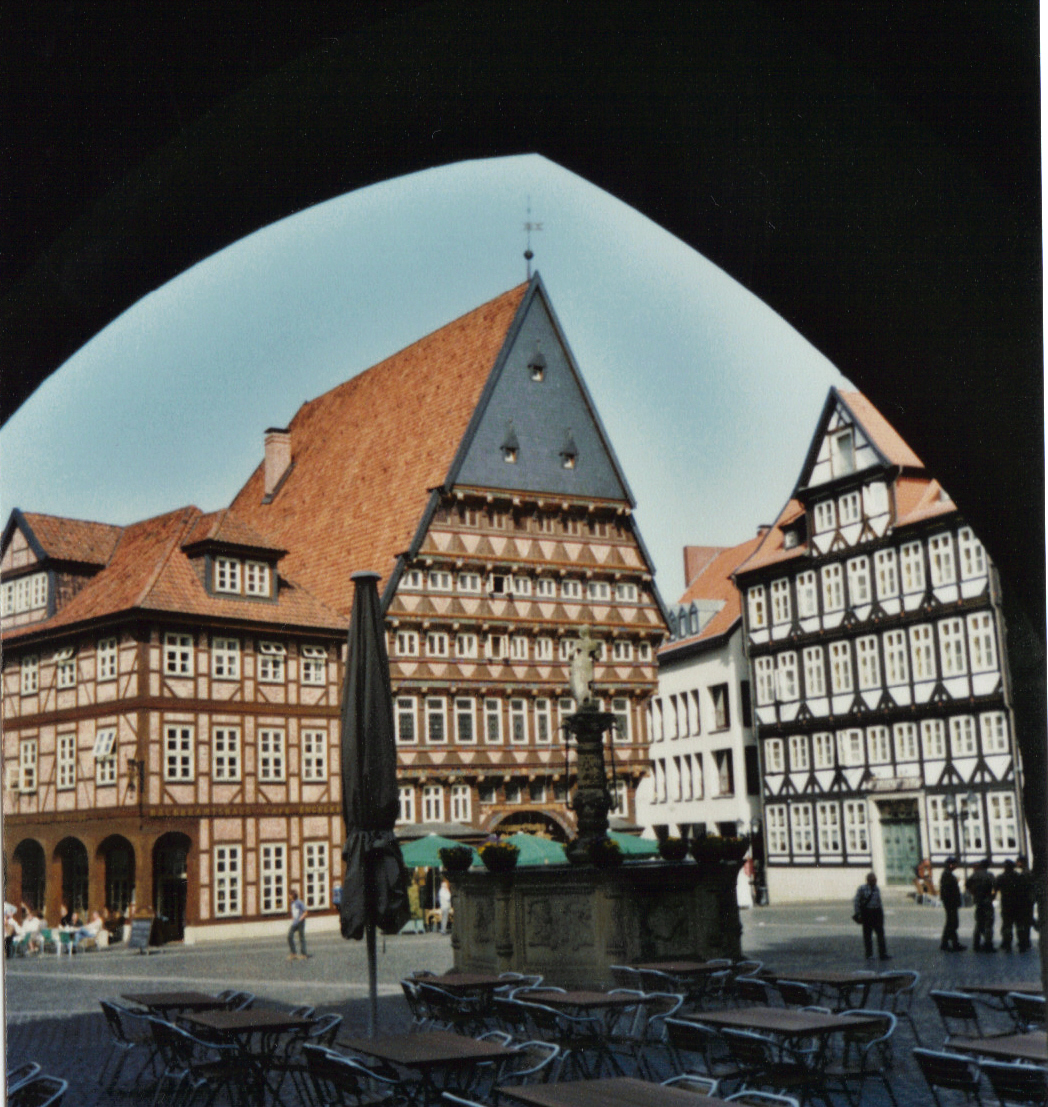
The reconstructed Bakers' Guild Hall (left), Butchers' Guild Hall (middle) and Old City Tavern (right) today, seen from the City Hall.

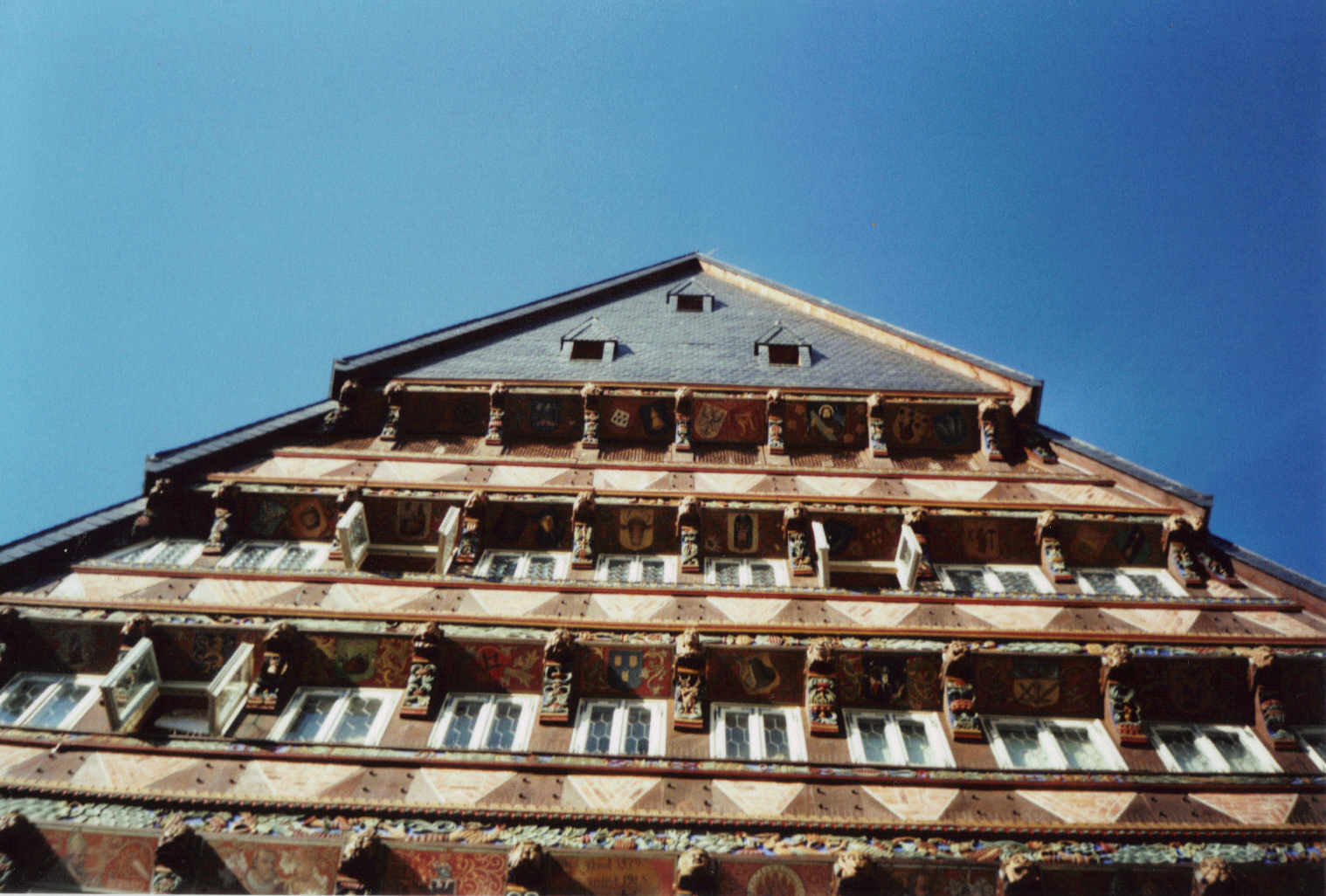
Details of the façade.

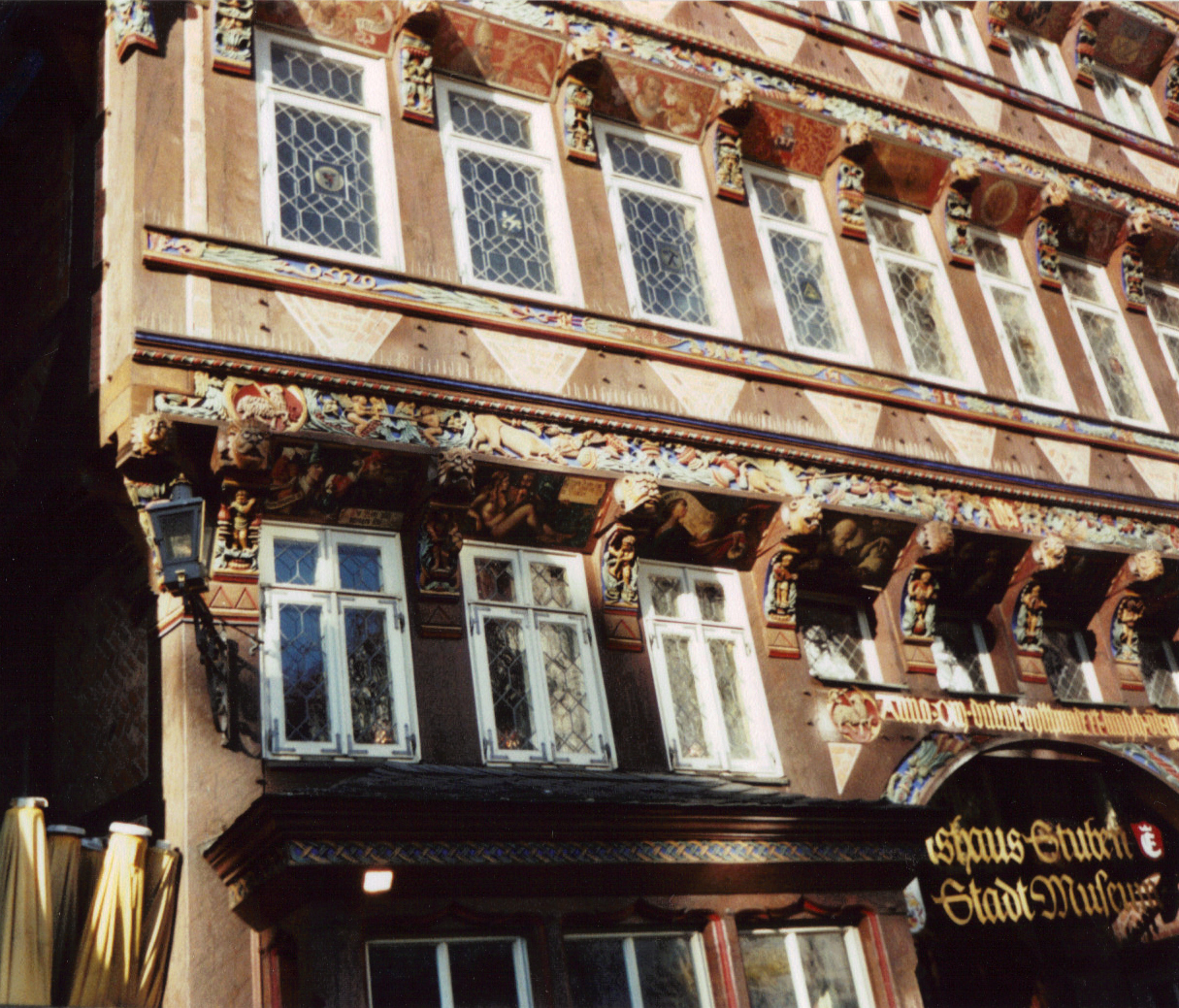
Details of the façade.

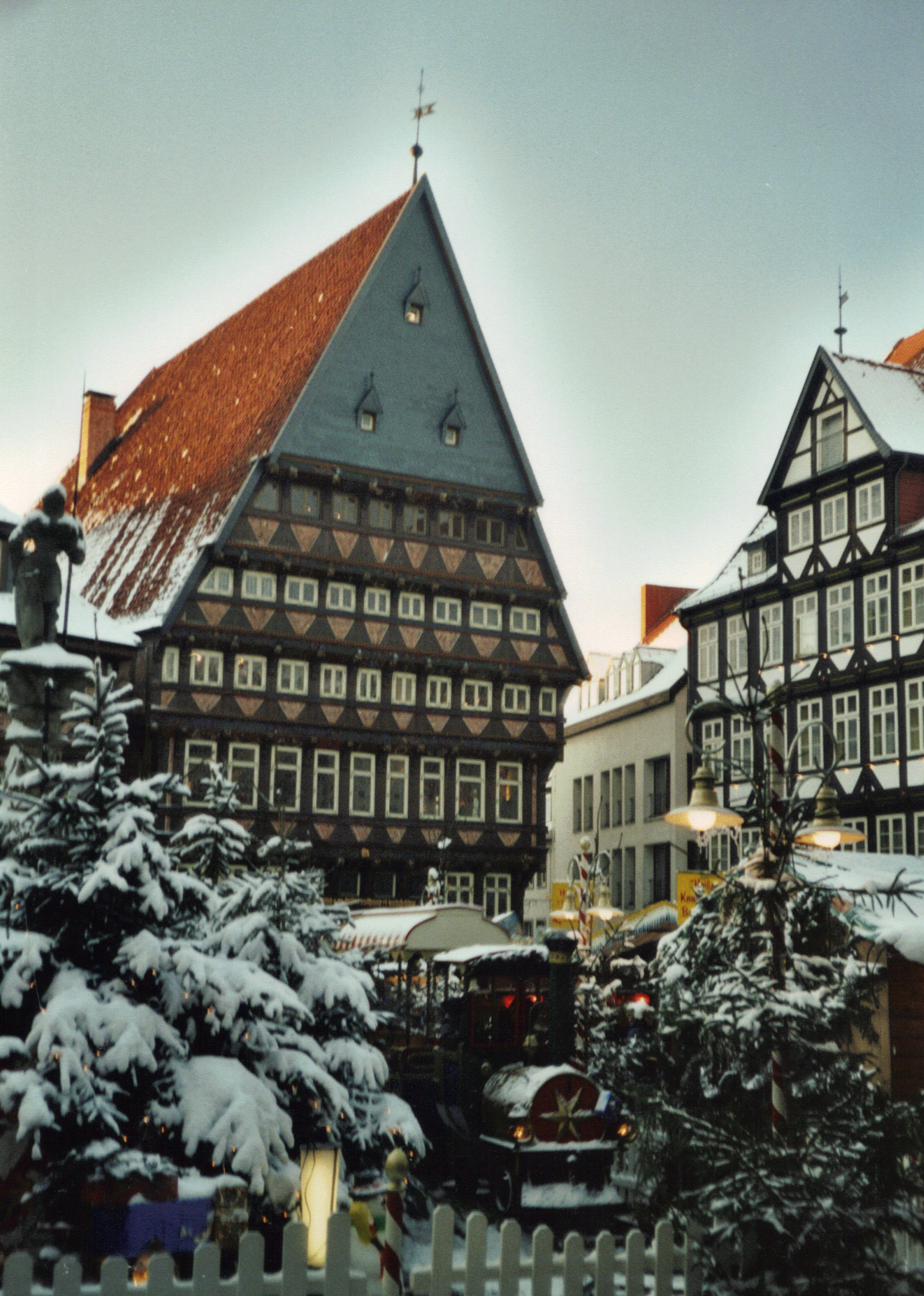
Traditional Christmas Market in front of the Butchers' Guild Hall.

The Butcher's Guild Hall, an example of half-timbered building, is one of the largest structures in the Historic Market Place of Hildesheim. With its 7 floors and a height of 26 metres, it is considered to be one of the tallest half-timbered houses in Germany. The roof has a dimension of 800 square metres. The portal has a width of 2.35 meters. The façade is decorated with colourful wood carvings, paintings, and German proverbs.

=== Origins ===
The Butchers' Guild Hall was originally built in 1529 in a Gothic style. The Architect's name, however, remains unknown. The building was used as a meeting place of the butchers' guild, which was a very wealthy and influential guild in Hildesheim in the Middle Ages. The cellar has walls with a thickness of up to 1.4 metres which keep the temperature very low; it was used for storing meat and sausages. The Old City Tavern (German: Stadtschänke), another tall half-timbered house, was built opposite in 1666. In 1825, the adjoining smaller Bakers' Guild Hall (German: Bäckeramtshaus) was built, replacing an older guildhall. In 1884, the 4th, 5th, 6th, and 7th floors were destroyed by a fire, but rebuilt immediately. On this occasion, detailed construction plans were made.

=== Destruction ===
During World War II, Hildesheim's neighbouring cities Hanover and Braunschweig suffered severe bomb damage as early as in 1943 and 1944 and many historic buildings were destroyed. As a consequence, the City Council of Hildesheim contemplated the dismantlement of the Butcher's Guild Hall, but this proved to be impossible. Gypsoplasts were taken of the most valuable wooden carvings, a precise wooden model was made and many photos were taken of the building. The construction plans were put in safekeeping.

On 22 March 1945 the half-timbered houses of the market place including the Butcher's Guild Hall were destroyed by incendiary bombs. Only the vault construction of the cellar remained. In the 1950s the houses were replaced by concrete buildings with flat roofs. One of these buildings was used by the Municipal Savings Bank. The Butchers' Guild Hall was replaced by a hotel with seven floors which was built from 1962-64.

=== Reconstruction ===
At the beginning of the 1980s, the hotel in the Market Place went bankrupt and the expanding Municipal Savings Bank needed a larger building. On this occasion, the city council decided to tear down the concrete buildings and to reconstruct the historic Market Place of Hildesheim in the original style. Many inhabitants of Hildesheim donated money for the project and provided old photos and drawings. Some of the old construction plans of the Butchers' Guild Hall were preserved. The foundation stone was laid on 27 October 1987. 400 cubic metres of oak wood, 7,500 wooden pegs and 19,000 roof tiles, which were nearly 150 years old, were used. The Roofing Ceremony was held on 15 January 1989, and the reconstruction was completed in December 1989. The total costs of reconstructing the Butcher's and Bakers' Guild Halls amounted to DM 13.6 million, approximately €7 million.

The Upended Sugarloaf, another half-timbered house which had been destroyed in 1945, was rebuilt in the same way in 2009/2010.
