= Upended Sugarloaf =

Coordinates: 52°09′08″N 9°57′00″E

The Upended Sugarloaf
- Der umgestülpte Zuckerhut
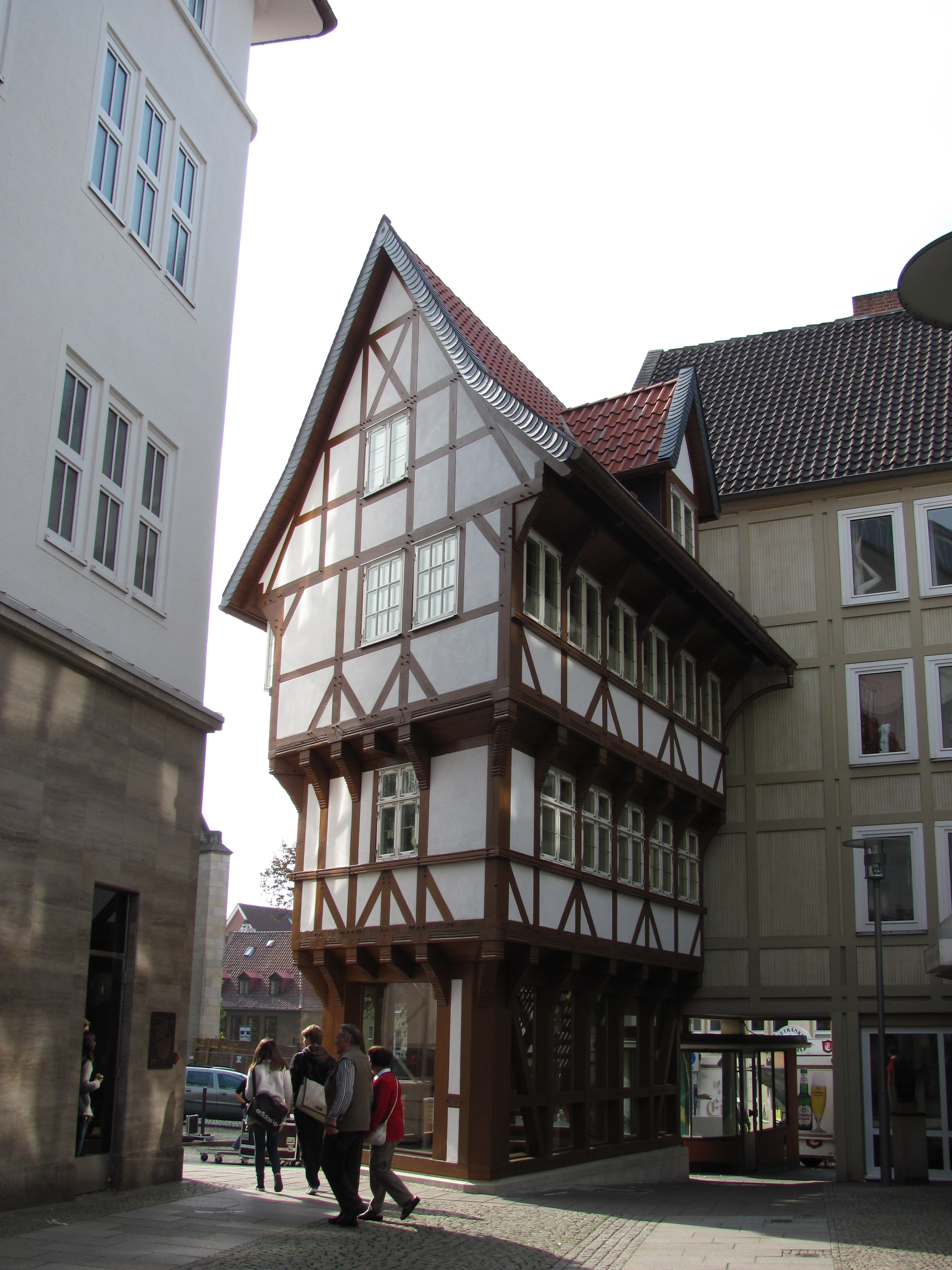
- Replica of the Upended Sugarloaf

- Location within Lower Saxony

General information
- Location: Hildesheim, Germany
- Year built: 1500-1510
- Construction started: 27 October 2009 (replica)
- Completed: 9 November 2009 (replica)
- Inaugurated: 8 October 2010 (replica)
- Destroyed: 22 March 1945

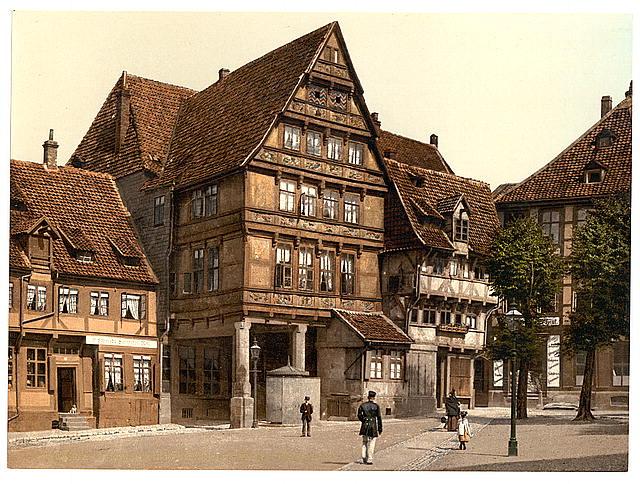
The original Upended Sugarloaf and Pfeilerhaus (photo about 1890-1900), which was destroyed in World War II

The Upended Sugarloaf (in German: Der umgestülpte Zuckerhut) is a half-timbered house in the city of Hildesheim in the federal state of Lower Saxony in Germany.

== History and architecture ==
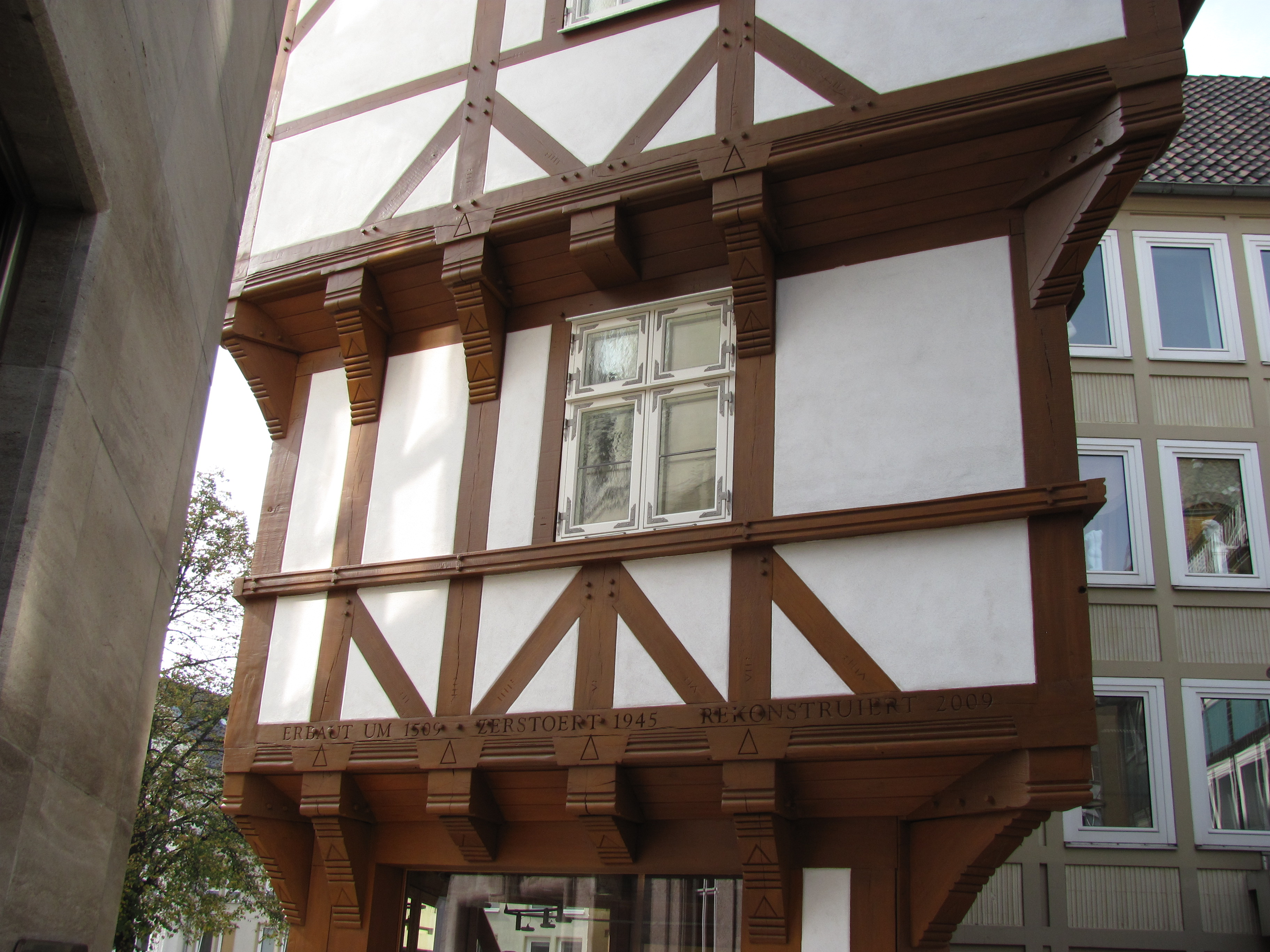
Wood carvings.

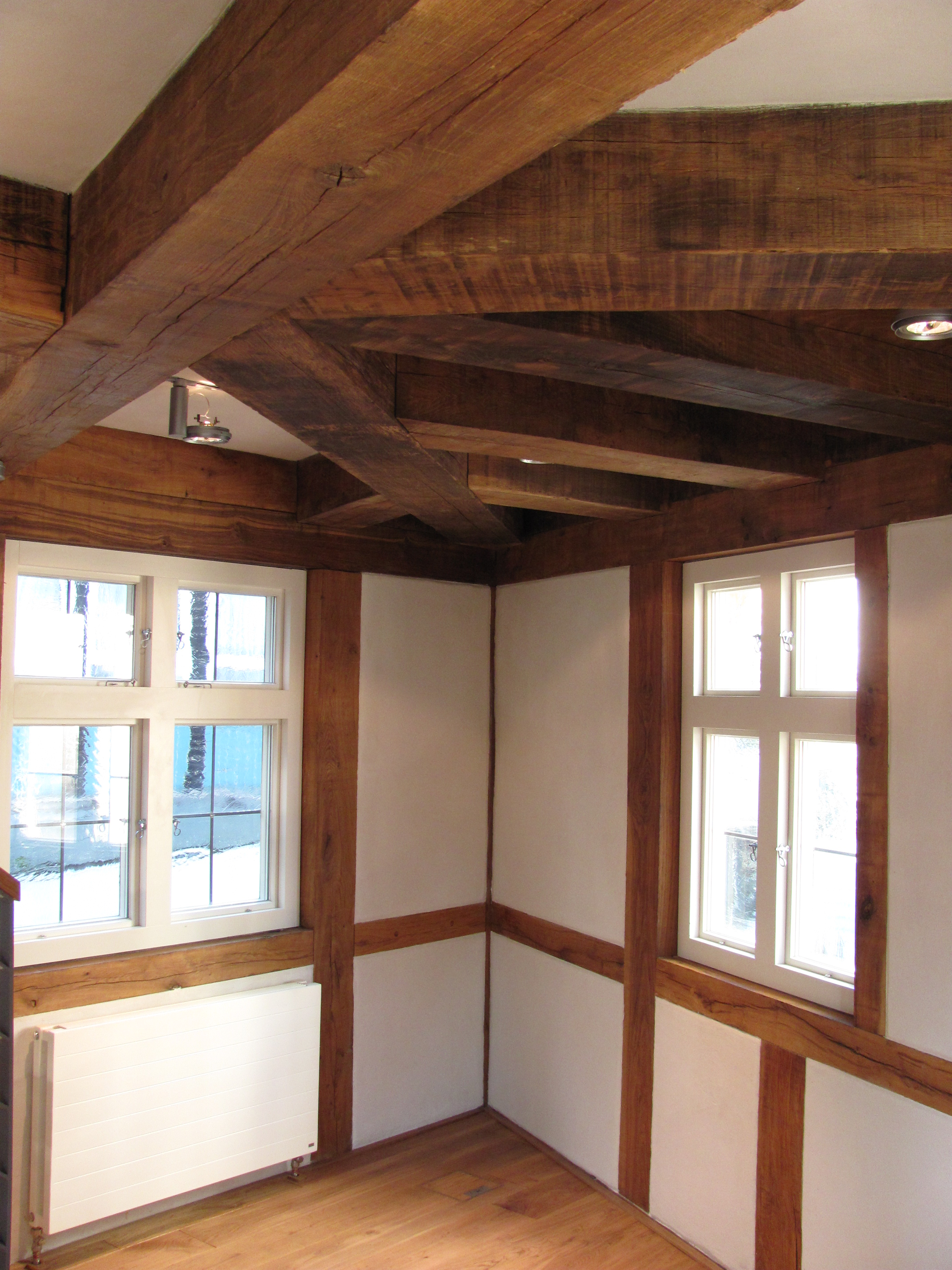
Interior.

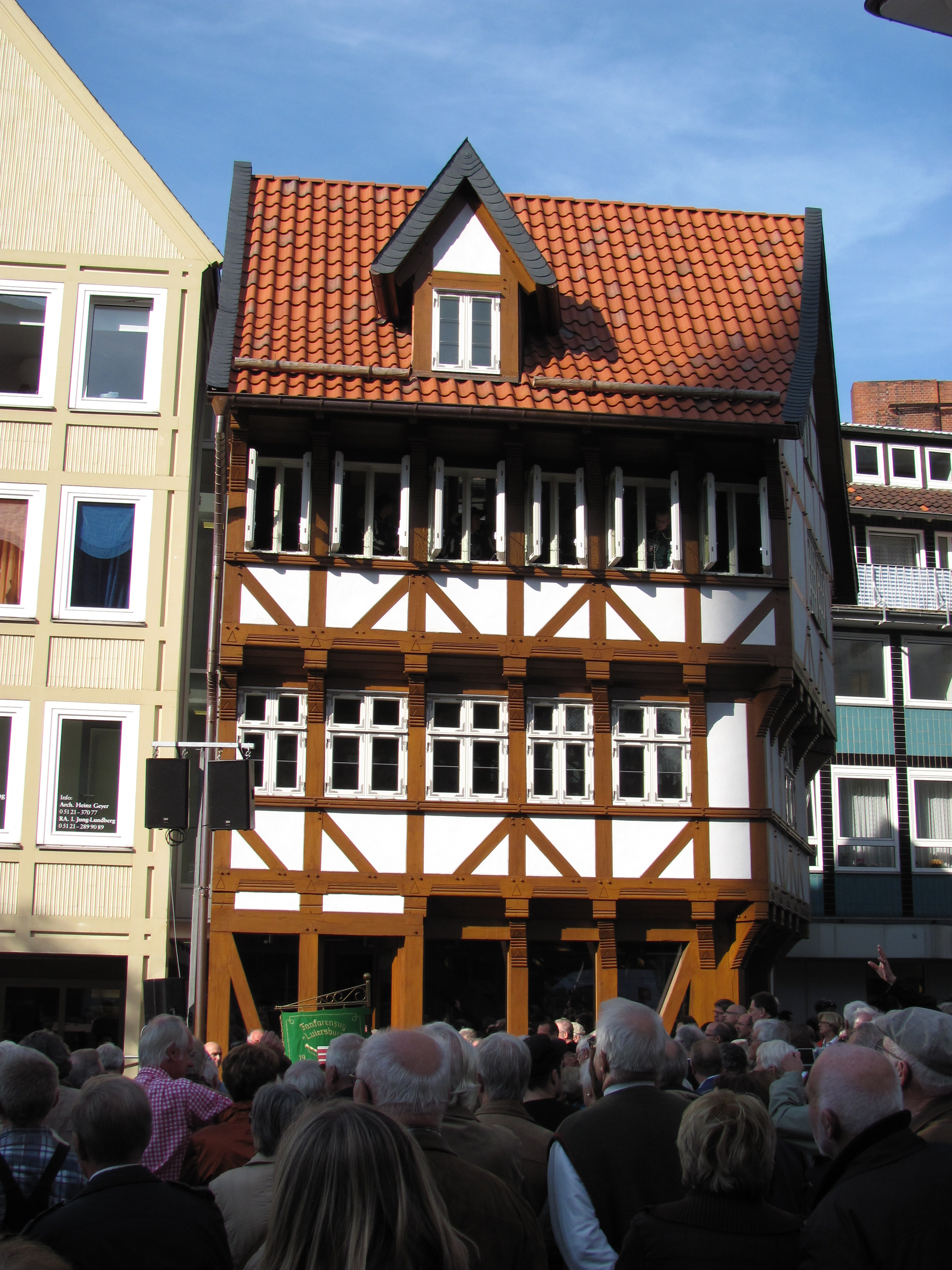
Inauguration on 8 October 2010.

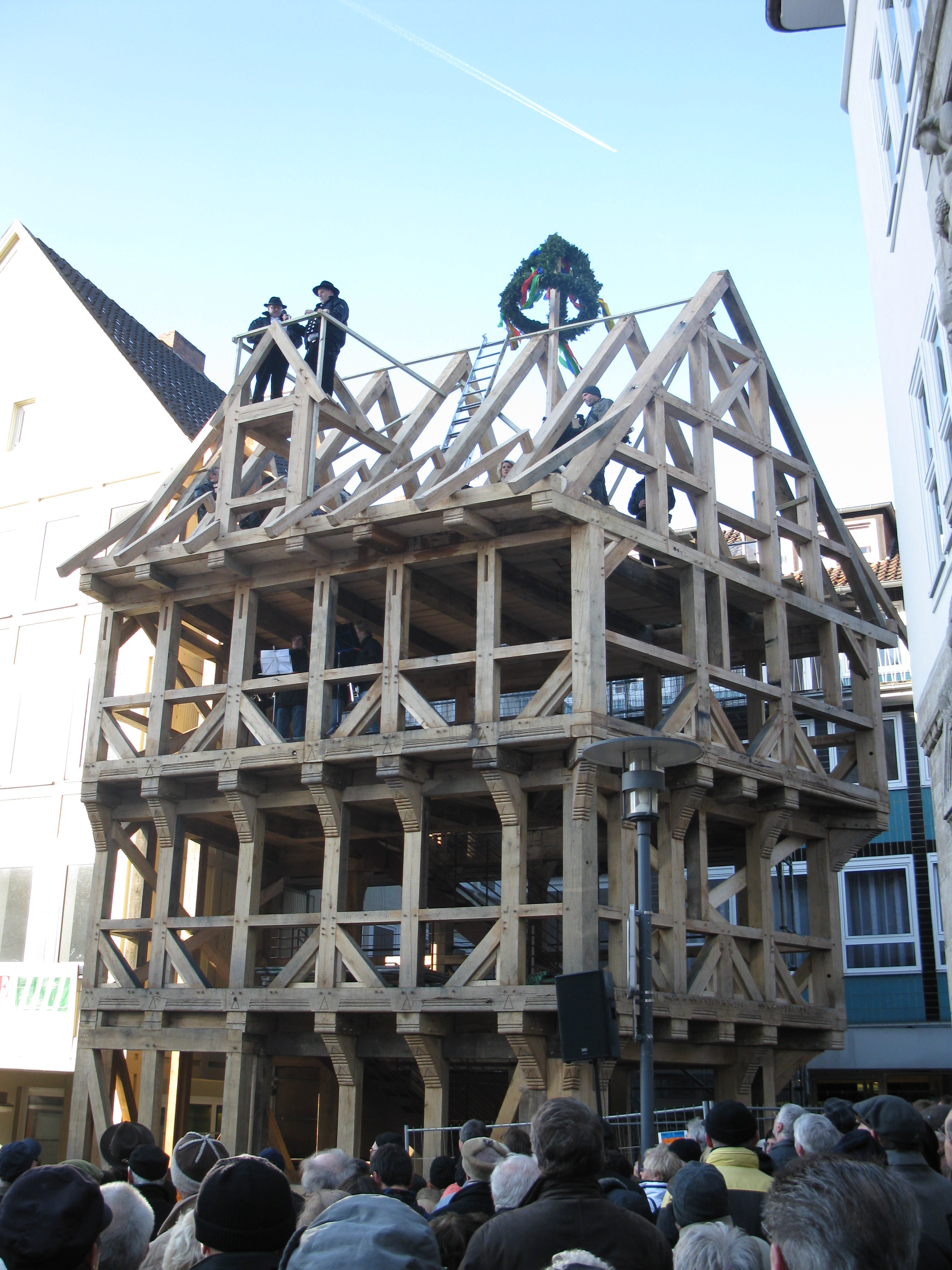
Roofing Ceremony on 3 February 2010.

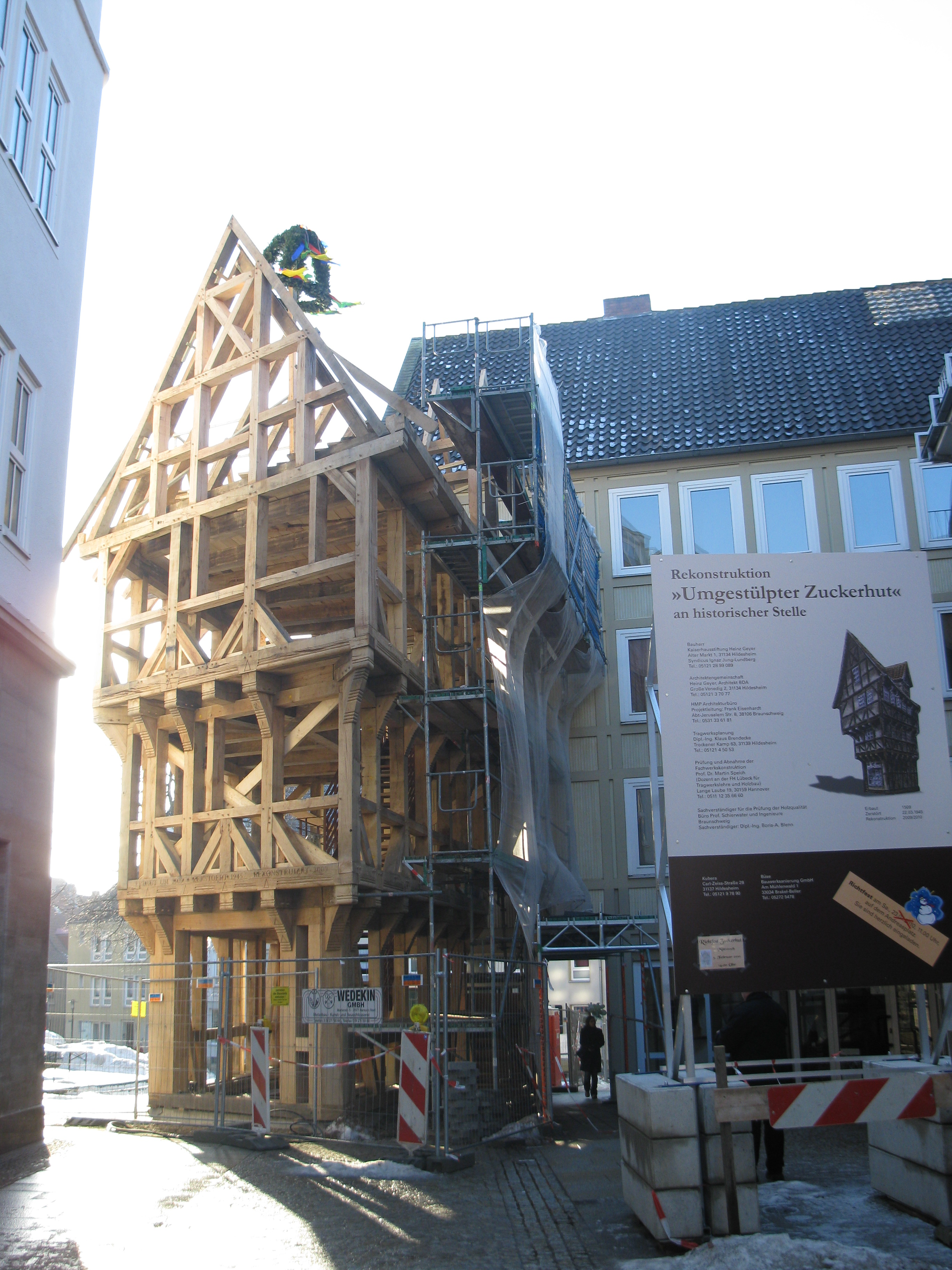
Roofing Ceremony on 3 February 2010.

The Upended Sugarloaf is a historic building in Saint Andrew's Place (Andreasplatz) in the center of Hildesheim, opposite Saint Andrew's Church. Originally, it was built in the Middle Ages between 1500 and 1510, but the exact year and the architect's name remain unknown. The shape of the building is very unusual, looking similar to an upended sugarloaf. The ground floor is 17 m² in space, the first floor is larger and the second floor covers 29 m².

=== Destruction ===
In the Second World War, the Upended Sugarloaf was slightly damaged during an air raid on 22 February 1945. On 22 March 1945, however, the building was completely destroyed by incendiary bombs. After the war, the Upended Sugarloaf was not immediately rebuilt. The space which had been occupied by the building was not used for building purposes again before 2009.

=== Reconstruction ===
In the 1980s, the historic market place of Hildesheim, which had been destroyed in 1945 as well, was reconstructed in the authentic style using old photos and construction plans. From 2000 on, the Altstadtgilde, a private association dedicated to the embellishment of the city, started collecting funds to reconstruct the Upended Sugarloaf and bought the piece of land where the building had stood before the war. Many inhabitants donated money for the project, as the Altstadtgilde intended to give the building to the City of Hildesheim as a present. The City Council, however, hesitated a long time before accepting the present, but finally the building permit was granted on 4 February 2009.

The reconstruction using 60 cubic meters of oak wood and 728 wooden pegs was started on 27 October 2009. Many inhabitants of Hildesheim provided old photos and drawings for the project, as the original construction plans were not preserved. The construction of the foundation was completed on 9 November 2009 and the Roofing Ceremony was held on 3 February 2010. The building was inaugurated on 8 October 2010. The Upended Sugarloaf is now used as a café. The Association Altstadtgilde as building sponsor estimated that the total costs of the reconstruction amounted to €1,500,000.

== Sources ==
- Jens-Uwe Brinkmann: Hildesheim - so wie es war. Droste Verlag GmbH, Düsseldorf 1976. ISBN 3-7700-0428-0.
- Hans Schlotter: Hildesheim in alten Ansichtskarten - Band 1. Verlag Europäische Bibliothek, Zaltbommel/NL 1993. ISBN 978-90-288-1633-6.
