= Historic Market Place, Hildesheim =

Square in Hildesheim, Lower Saxony, Germany

Coordinates: 52.1528°N 9.9517°E

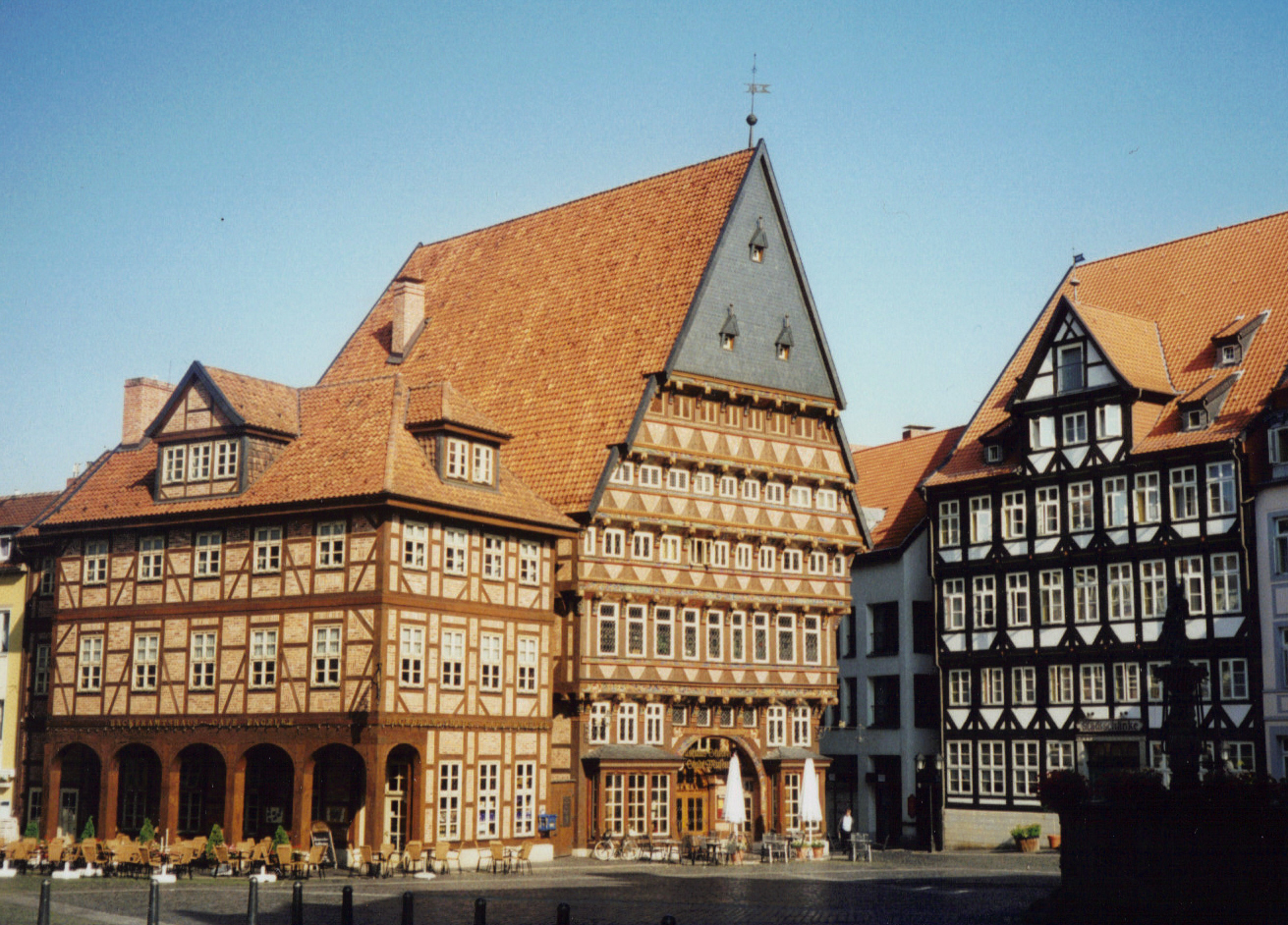
Bakers' Guild Hall (left), Butchers' Guild Hall (middle), Old Tavern (right)

The Historic Market Place is a historical structure in the city of Hildesheim in Lower Saxony, Germany.

== History ==
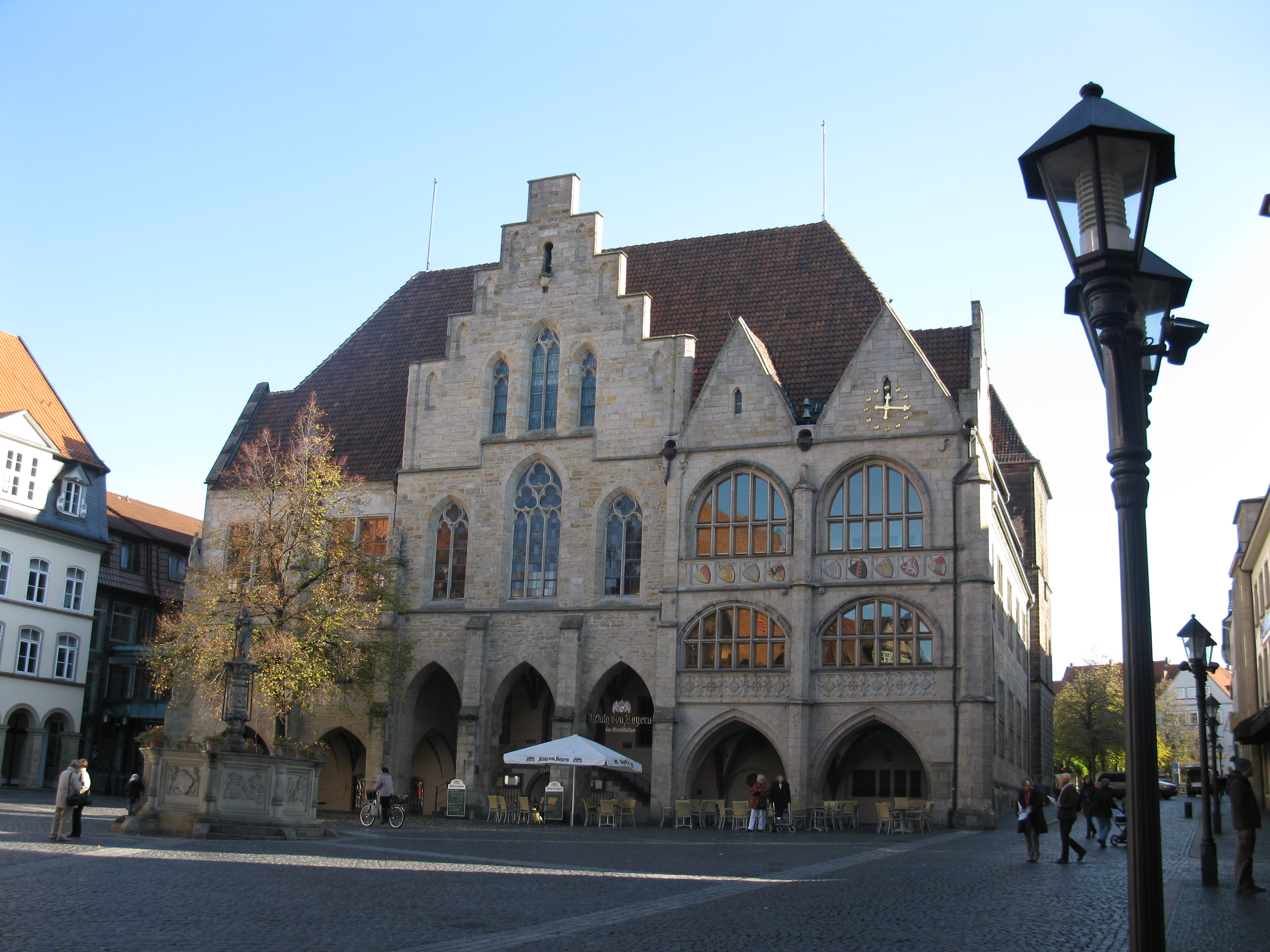
City Hall

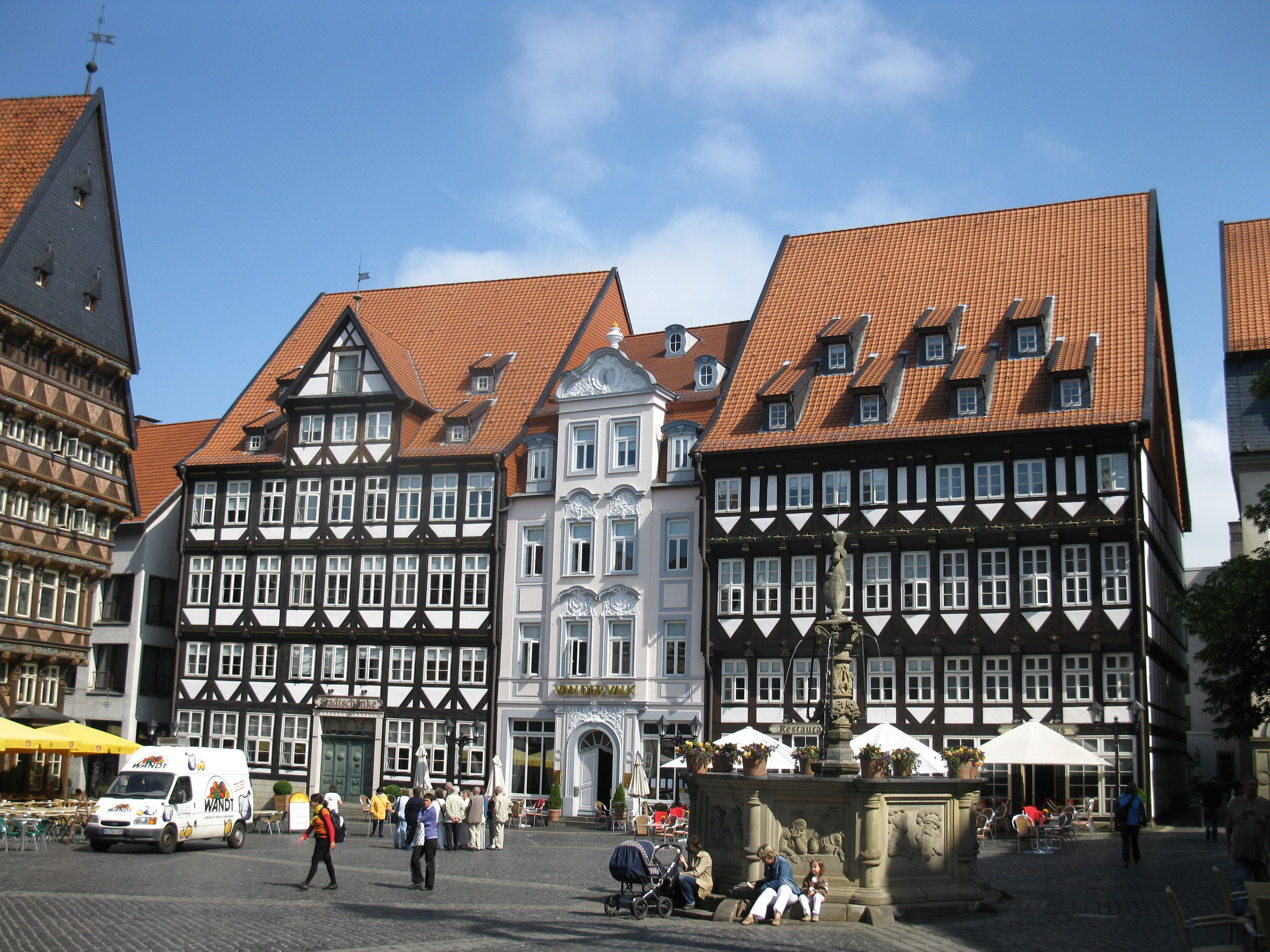
City Tavern (left), Rococo House (middle), Weavers' Guild Hall (right), Market Fountain in the foreground.

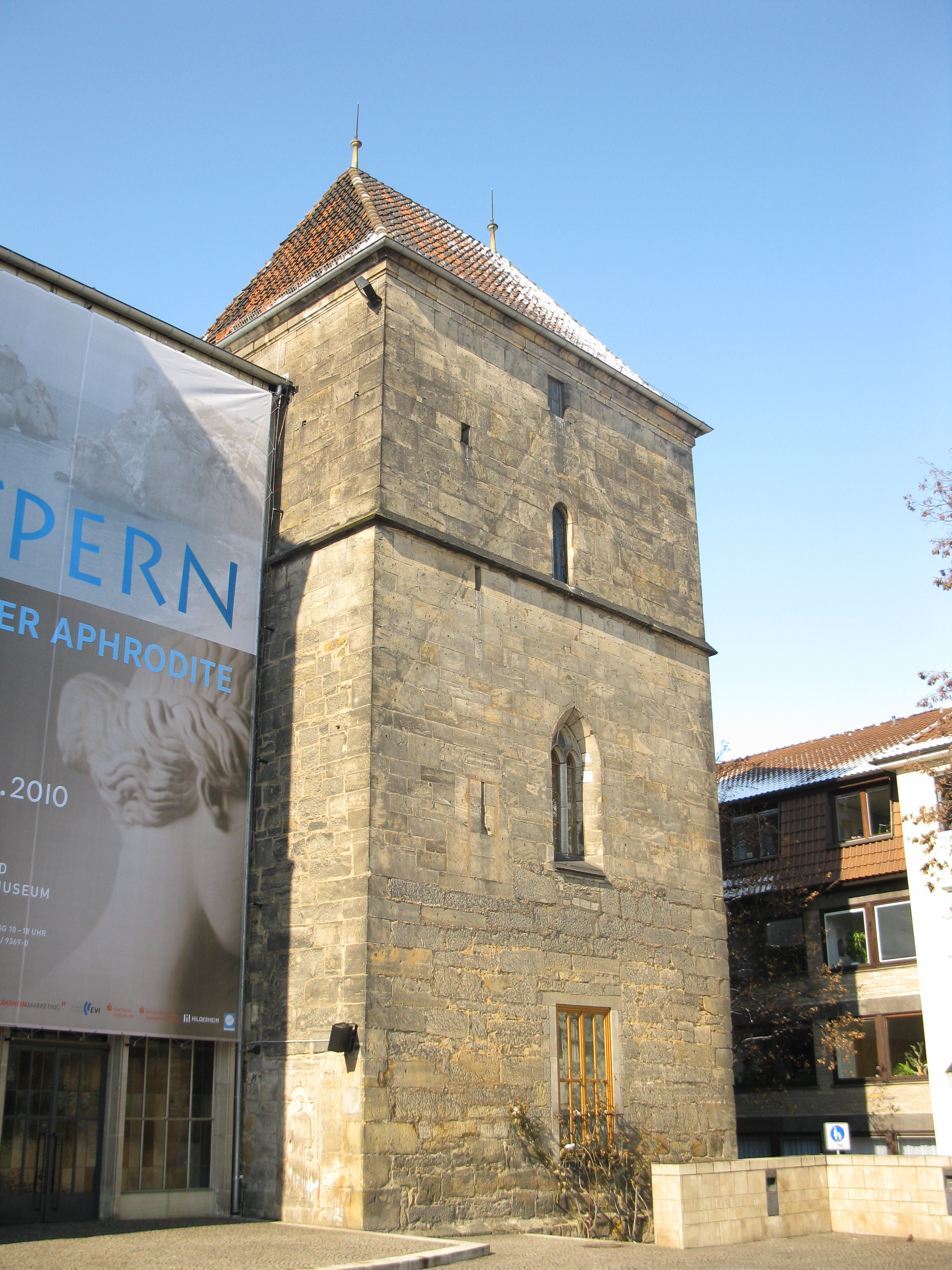
Tower Lilie (Lily) of the City Hall

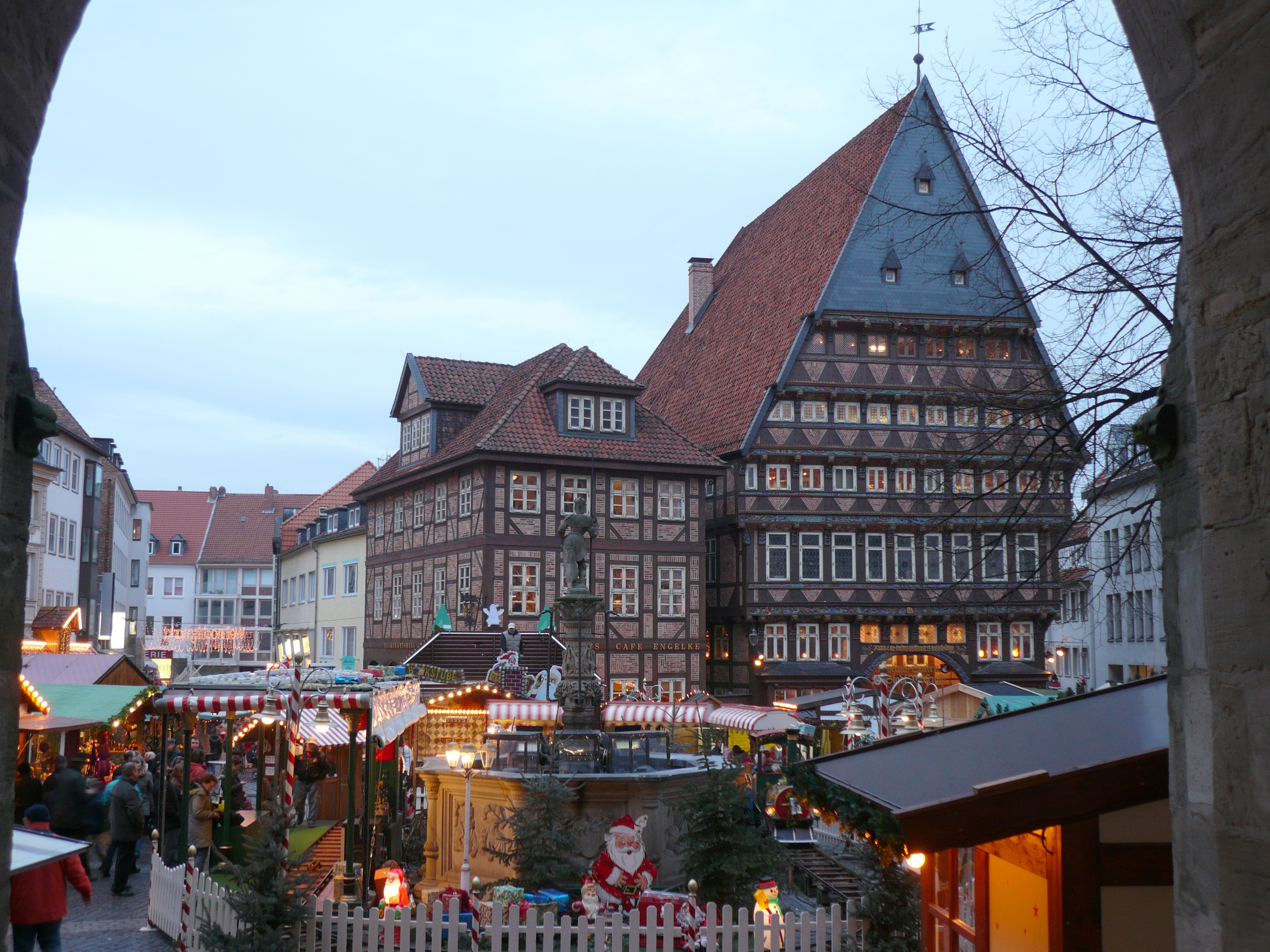
Christmas Market

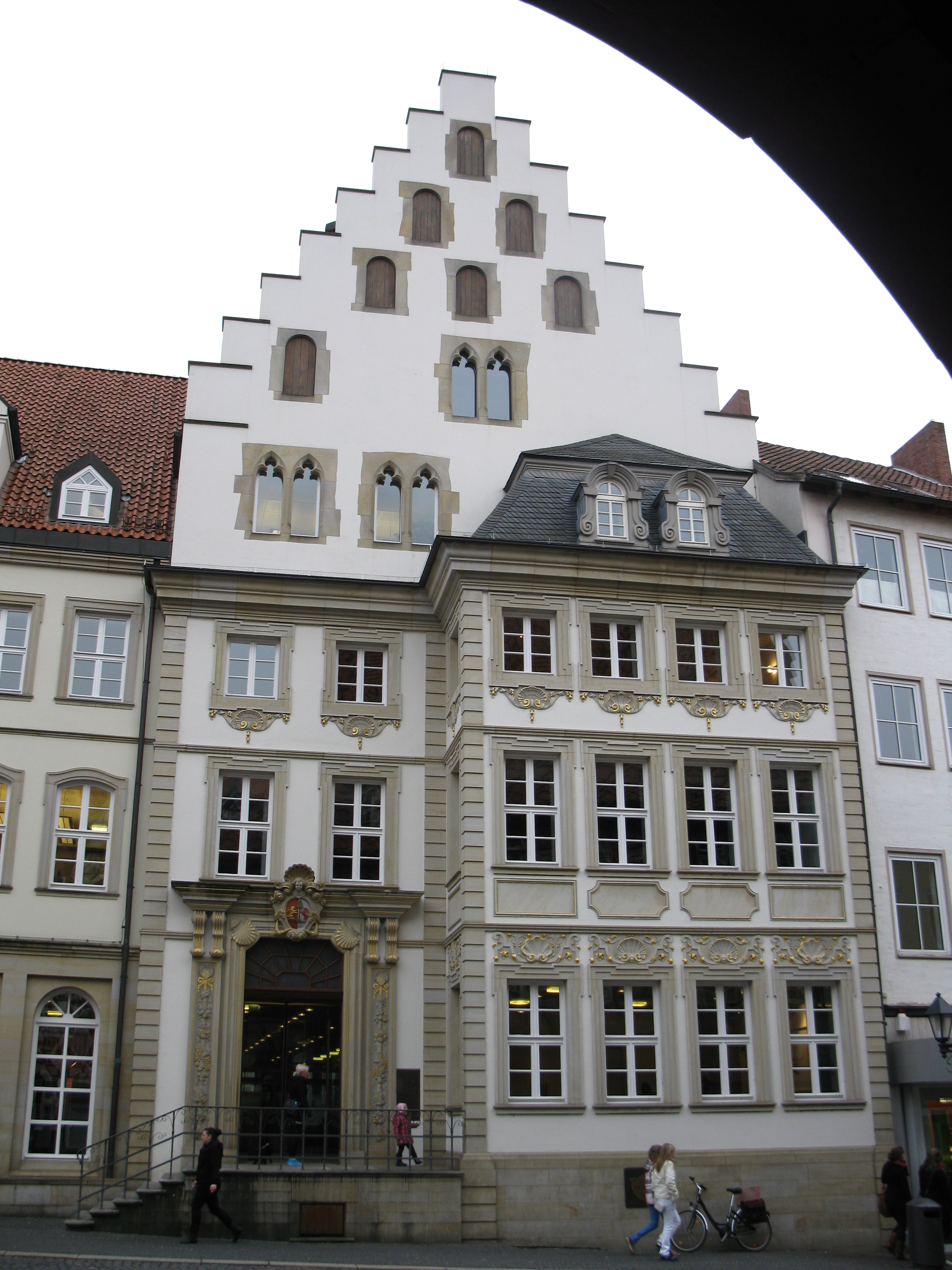
Roland House

Hildesheim, one of the oldest cities in the North of Germany, was founded in 815 as a bishopric close to a ford of the river Innerste. The settlement very quickly developed into a town which was awarded market rights by King Otto III in 983. Originally the market was held in a street called Old Market (Alter Markt) which still exists today. The first market place was laid out around the church St. Andreas. When the city grew further, a bigger market place became necessary. The present market place of Hildesheim was laid out at the beginning of the 13th century when the city had about 5,000 inhabitants. When Hildesheim obtained city rights in 1249, it was one of the biggest cities in Northern Germany. Construction of the present City Hall started in 1268. Several impressive half-timbered houses were built in the Market Place as well. The Butchers' Guild Hall was the tallest and the most famous of them.

During World War II, Hildesheim suffered severe bomb damage. On 22 March 1945 the half-timbered houses of the market place were destroyed by incendiary bombs, and the City Hall and the Temple House, a patrician house dating from the 14th century, which were built of sandstone, were severely damaged.

In the 1950s the houses which had been completely destroyed were replaced by concrete buildings with flat roofs. One of these buildings was used by the Municipal Savings Bank. The Butchers' Guild Hall was replaced by a hotel which was built from 1962 to 1964. Only the City Hall and the Temple House were rebuilt in the original style.

At the beginning of the 1980s, the hotel in the Market Place went bankrupt and the expanding Municipal Savings Bank needed a larger building. On this occasion, the city council decided to tear down the concrete buildings and to reconstruct the historic Market Place of Hildesheim in the original style.

The reconstruction was started in the Western part of the Market Place in 1983. Many inhabitants of Hildesheim donated money for the project and provided old photos and drawings. In some cases, old construction plans were preserved. The first houses, rebuilt in the original style, were inaugurated on 23 March 1986. Afterwards, the Eastern part of the Market place was rebuilt and the Market Fountain dating from 1542 was restored. A large public garage was built under the Market place as well. The Butchers' Guild Hall and the smaller adjoining Bakers' Guild Hall were the last buildings to be reconstructed. They were inaugurated in December 1989.

== Architecture ==
The Historic Market Place of Hildesheim was once considered one of the most beautiful market places in the world. The most noteworthy buildings in the square are:

- The Knochenhauer-Amtshaus ("Butchers' Guild Hall"), known as a beautiful and fine specimen of half-timbered building. Originally built in 1529 in a gothic style and destroyed in 1945, it was reconstructed from 1987 to 1989 according to original plans. 400 cubic meters of oak wood, 7,500 wooden pegs and 19,000 roof tiles, which were nearly 200 years old, were used. The façade is sumptuously decorated with colorful paintings and German proverbs. Today the building houses a restaurant and the City Museum.
- The adjoining Bäckeramtshaus (Bakers' Guild Hall) was originally built in 1825, replacing a much older guildhall. Like the other wooden buildings, it was destroyed on 22 March 1945. For the reconstruction, 70 cubic meters of oak wood were used. The foundation stone was laid on 27 October 1987, and the Roofing Ceremony was held on 31 October 1988. The Bakers' Guild Hall, which houses a café today, was inaugurated in December 1989.
- The City Hall, erected in Gothic style, is one of the oldest city halls in Germany. The construction was started in 1268 and completed in 1290, using sandstone from a local quarry which still can be seen in a forest in Hildesheim called Steinberg (Stone Mountain). Frequently remodelled over the centuries (e.g. in 1375, 1454 and 1883–87) and heavily damaged in 1945, the City Hall was rebuilt after the war and inaugurated in 1954. One of its towers, which remained nearly undamaged during the war, dates from the 13th century and is called "Lilie" (Lily). The origin of the name is uncertain. The tower consists of very thick walls (2 meters) and may have been a tower of the first city wall which was torn down when the city expanded and a new market place was necessary. Some of the windows of the "Lilie" are very small and look like firing slits. In the Eastern wall of the "Lilie", there is a noteworthy medieval relievo consisting of a sentence carved in gothic letters into the stone: Dat is de garenmathe which means "Das ist das Garnmaß" in the German language of today (That is the yarn measure). Around the inscription, the shape of a medieval measure still can be seen. The other tower which was added to the City Hall looks similar to the "Lilie", but it is much younger. It was built at the end of the 19th century. Like the "Lilie", this tower remained almost undamaged in World War II.
- The Tempelhaus (Temple House), a late-Gothic 14th-century patrician house, which today houses the tourist information office. The origin of the name is unknown. It might refer to a synagogue which was mentioned in a document written in 1385, as the house stands at the corner of a small street called "Judenstrasse" (Jews' Street). In 1322, the street name Judenstrasse was mentioned in a document for the first time. In the late Middle Ages, however, the Jews of Hildesheim lived in a quarter called Lappenberg which is another of the sights of Hildesheim, about one kilometer away from the Market Place. The Tempelhaus was remodelled several times, and in the 16th century the two round towers were added. In 1591, a very impressive Renaissance bay window with colourful stone carvings was added to the Temple House. At the beginning of the war, the bay window was dismantled and hidden in a cellar. The house suffered some damage during the Second World War but was restored and inaugurated in 1950 after the bay window had been added again.
- The Wedekindhaus (Wedekind House), a patrician house dating from 1598, is characterized by its high, ornately carved storeys including their ledges with depictions of allegorical figures. The building has been the headquarters of the Municipal Savings Bank since the 1950s. It was the first half-timbered house of the Market Place to be reconstructed. The inauguration was on 23 March 1986.
- The adjoining Lüntzelhaus (Lüntzel House) was originally built in 1755 in a baroque style. The name refers to a family to whom the house belonged in the 18th century. Like the Wedekindhaus, it is used by the Municipal Savings Bank today.
- The Rolandhaus (Roland House) with its stepped gables was originally built at the beginning of the 14th century in a gothic style. In 1750, a large baroque bay window was added and the façade was remodelled in a baroque style with a representative portal. The windows of the upper floors, however, still represent the typical gothic shape. The name of the house refers to a merchant who bought the house in 1757. After the destruction on 22 March 1945, the portal and a part of the bay window remained standing, but were torn down when the concrete buildings were to be erected in the 1950s.
- The Stadtschänke (City Tavern) on the North side of the Market Place was originally built in 1666. It is on the corner of "Kaneelstrasse" (Cinnamon Street), a small lane which in 1418 was mentioned in a document for the first time. Today the Stadtschänke, together with the adjoining smaller Rococo House dating from 1757, houses a hotel. The Rococo house has a façade decorated with stucco ornaments.
- The Wollenwebergildehaus (Weavers' Guild Hall), another large half-timbered house, was originally built approximately in 1600. It is on the corner of "Seilwinderstrasse" (Ropemaker Street), a small lane which in 1432 was mentioned in a document for the first time.
- The Market Fountain dating from 1542 is adorned with a watchman's figure and with sandstone reliefs.

== Christmas Market ==
Every year, a traditional Christmas market is held on the Historic Market Place of Hildesheim in winter. It starts in the last week of November and runs through to Christmas Eve. A large variety of traditional products and handicrafts, local delicacies and Christmas merchandise is offered. The Christmas Market is usually open from 10 am to about 8 or 9 pm.
