= St. Andreas, Hildesheim =

Lutheran church in Hildesheim, Germany

St. Andrew's
- Church of St. Andrew's
- Andreaskirche
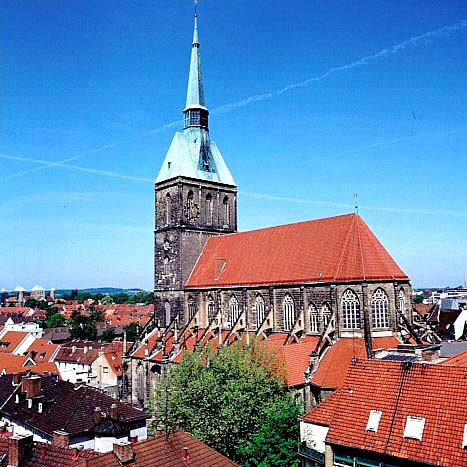
- St. Andrew's, amidst the urban roofscape

- Location within Lower Saxony Location within Germany
- 52°09′06″N 09°57′00″E
- Location: Hildesheim
- Country: Germany
- Denomination: Lutheran
- Previous denomination: Catholic
- Website: www.andreaskirche.com

History
- Status: parish church
- Dedication: Andrew the Apostle

Architecture
- Functional status: active
- Architectural type: basilica
- Style: Gothic; Romanesque (old westwork in the church)
- Groundbreaking: late 14th century
- Completed: 1504; 1883 (tower)

Specifications
- Length: 80 metres (260 ft)
- Width: 35 metres (115 ft)

Administration
- Deanery: Hildesheim-Sarstedt (Kirchenkreis)
- Parish: St.-Andreas-Gemeinde, Hildesheim

The church of St. Andreas is the principal Lutheran church of Hildesheim, Germany, not to be confounded with the Catholic Hildesheim Cathedral. Its tower is 114.5 metres (376 ft) tall, making it the tallest church tower in Lower Saxony; it is accessible (364 steps) and offers a panoramic view of both the city and surrounding countryside.

== History ==
The earliest church building on the Treibeinsel dedicated to the Apostle Andreas (Andrew) was a simple pre-Romanesque chapel, which already existed at the death of Bishop Bernward in 1022. Bishop Godehard was brought here after his death in 1038 so the people could mourn.

During the romanesque period, the center of the market and workshops was relocated from the swampy lowlands between Domburg and Michaeliskirche ("Old Market") to near St. Andreas. The chapel was subsequently replaced with a romanesque church with a strong westwork.

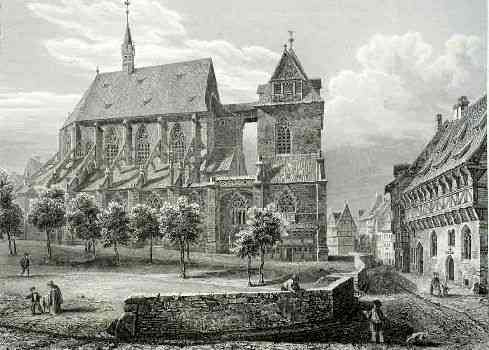
St. Andreas in 1850

The building of the gothic church, in the basilica style and romanesque westwork, was begun at the end of the fourteenth century, the choir in 1389, the northern nave in 1404, and the tower in 1503. By 1504, the nave with its side altars was finished and all that remained to be completed was the tower. This was only done in 1883-1890, when the tower reached its current height. The interior, with the quire and the radiating side chapels to the east, was modeled after the French cathedrals.

Like market churches in many other German dioceses, St. Andreas represented bourgeois self-confidence in the High Middle Ages in comparison to the lordship of the Bishops, manifested in the cathedral. During the Reformation, this old question of authority was combined with the religious question. Consequently, in 1542, St. Andreas became the first church in Hildesheim to support Lutheranism; it was also there where Johannes Bugenhagen initiated the new church order. This is remembered in the 1995 Brunnen Memorial by Ulrich Henn, which is located in the southern forecourt of the church.

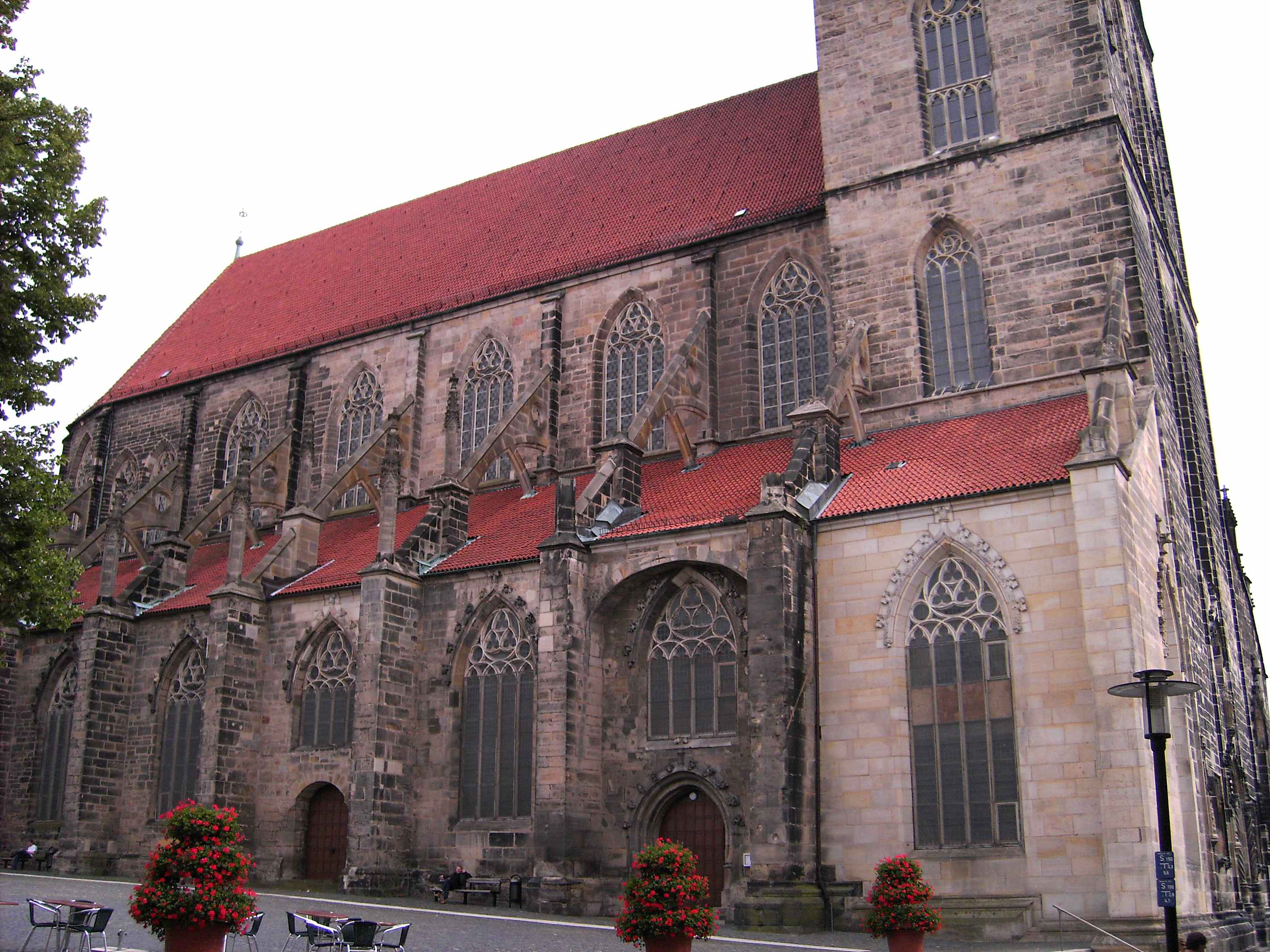
The nave

The church burned down during the Second World War on 22 March 1945, and only the ruined outer wall remained standing. From 1956-1965, St. Andreas was completely rebuilt as an almost exact copy of the original. A new, four manual organ was built by Rudolf von Beckerath and completed in 1966.

Opposite the church, the Upended Sugarloaf, a famous half timbered-house with a very unusual shape, was rebuilt in 2009/2010.

== Bells ==
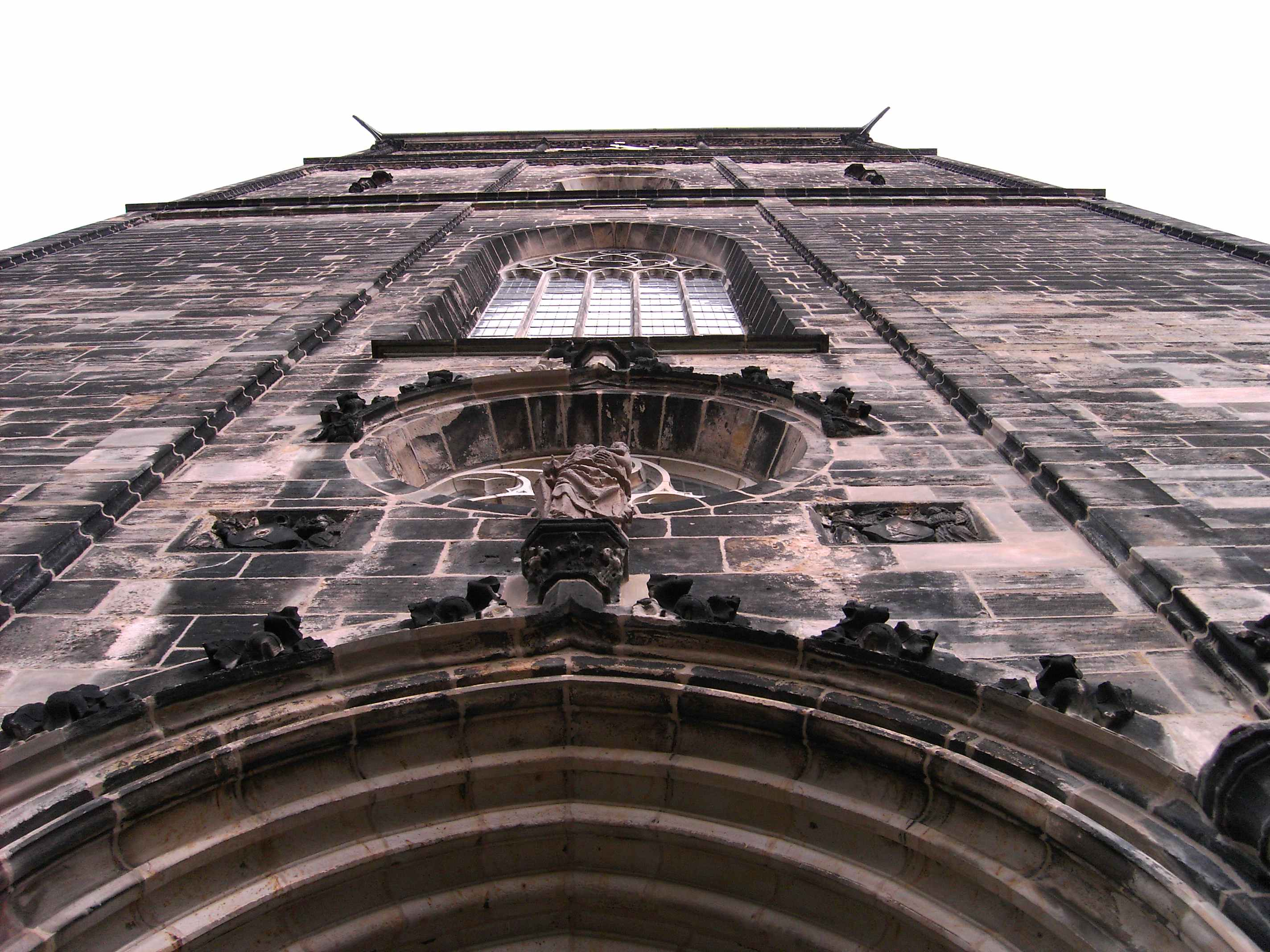
The tower

In the tower hang four bells from 1725, 1738, 1632, and 1963:

No.	name	year cast	foundry, place of cast	diameter (m)	weight (kg)	strike tone	Loan by the presbytery of the formerly Lutheran church of
1	St. Andreas	1963	Rincker Bros., Sinn	2.15 metres (7.1 ft)	6,500 kilograms (14,300 lb)	G♭^{0}	own bell
2	Osanna	1632		1.75 metres (5.7 ft)	3,000 kilograms (6,600 lb)	B♭^{0}	St. Mary's, Danzig
3	Maria	1738		1.36 metres (4.5 ft)	1,500 kilograms (3,300 lb)	D♭^{1}	St. George's, Rastenburg
4	Petrus	1725		1.22 metres (4.0 ft)	1,300 kilograms (2,900 lb)	E♭^{1}	Mühlhausen in West Prussia

== Measurements ==
The church's dimensions attest to the prosperity and self-confidence of the Hildesheim citizens. St. Andreas is with its 114.5 m tower one of the tallest churches of the world.

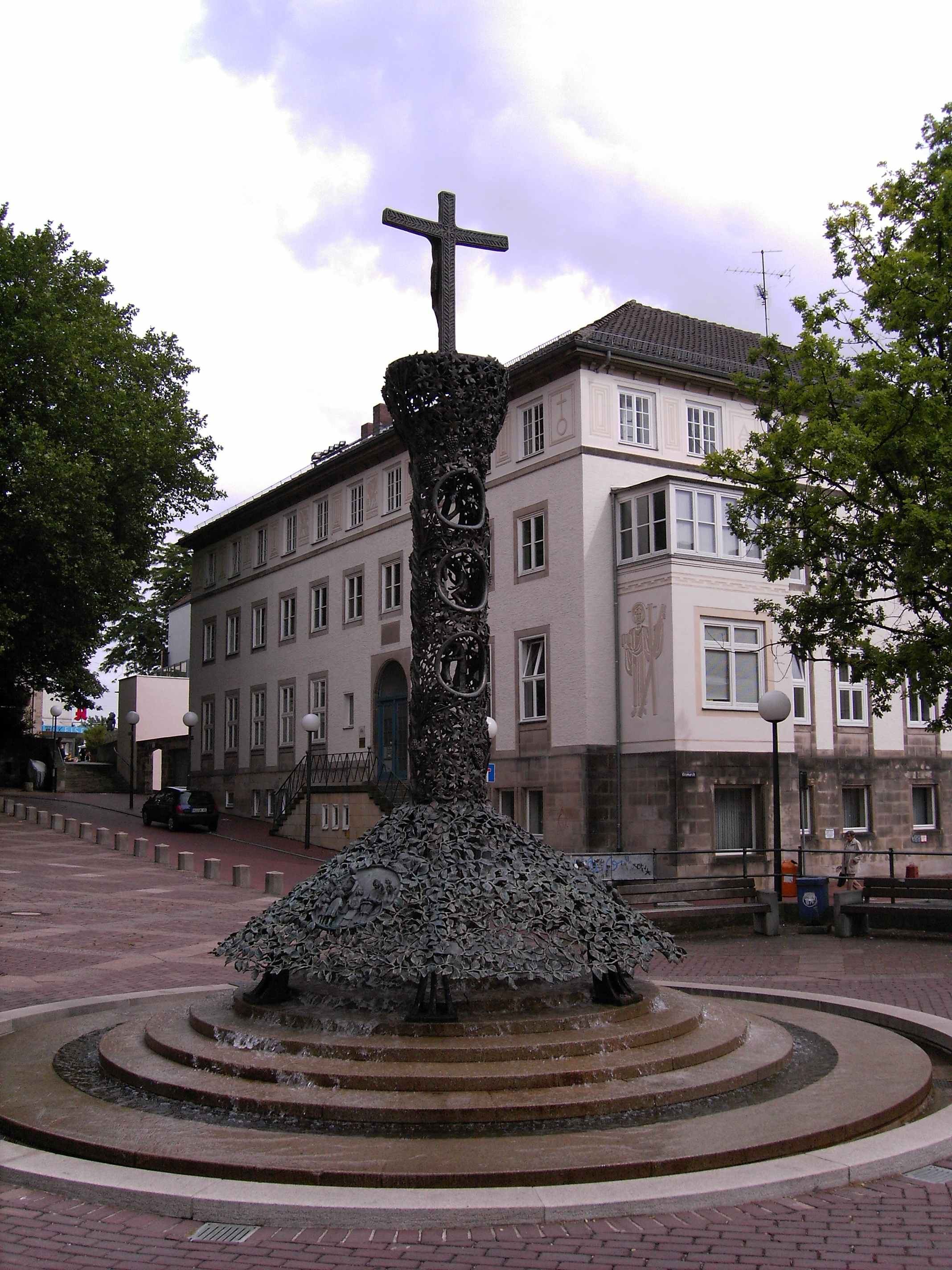
A fountain near St. Andreas

- Length: 80 m
- Width: 35 m
- Height: 27 m
- Tower: 114.5 m

== See also ==
- List of tallest structures built before the 20th century
