= Bombing of Hildesheim in World War II =

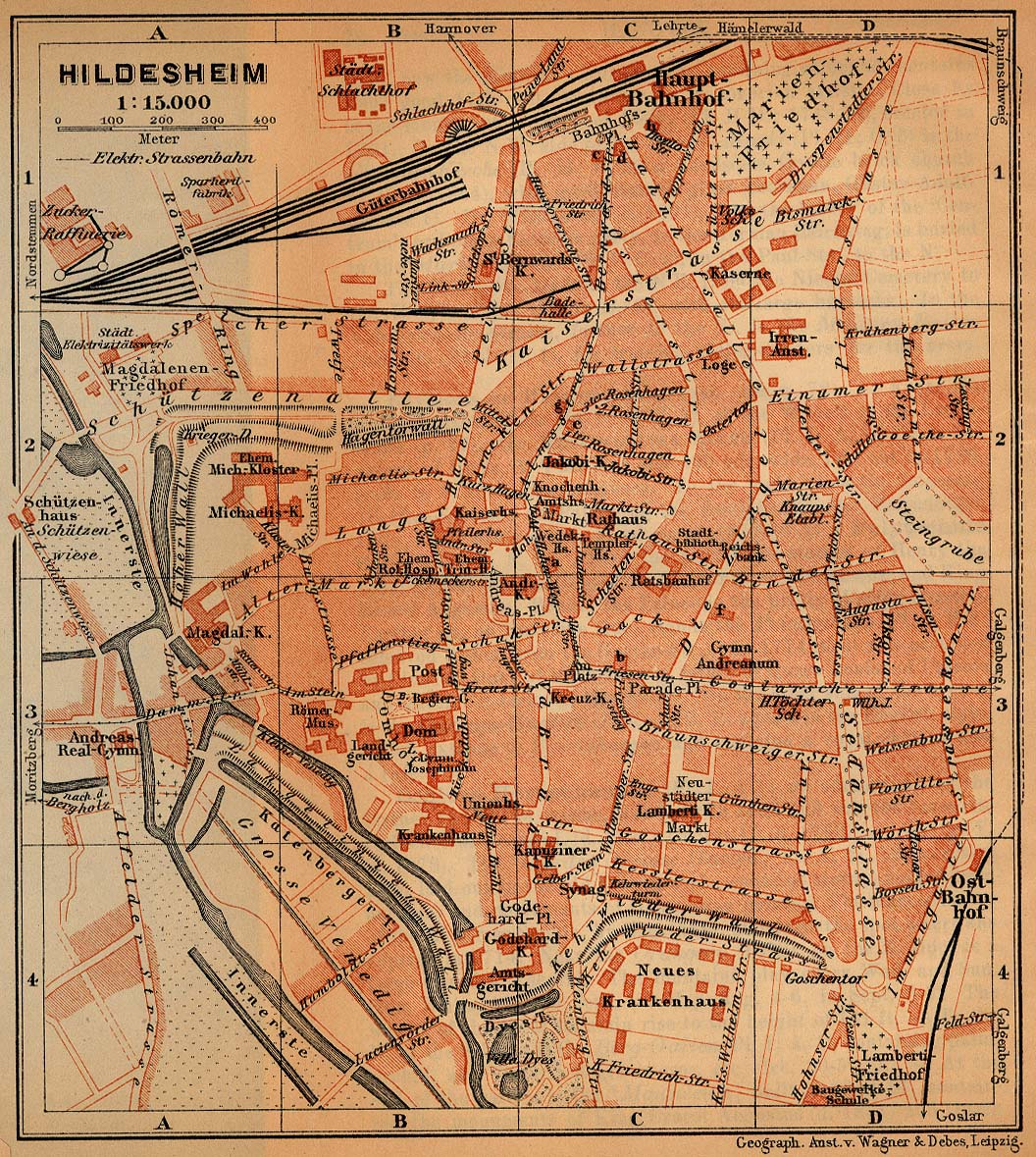
1905 map of Hildesheim's city centre

The German city of Hildesheim, about 30 kilometres (19 mi) south of Hanover, was the target of eight Allied air raids in 1944 and 1945 and suffered considerable bomb damage.

== Hildesheim during World War II ==
In 1939 Hildesheim had about 72,000 inhabitants. For most of the war Hildesheim was regarded as a minor target by British Bomber Command mainly because the military potential of the industry in and around Hildesheim was underestimated and classified as "relatively small importance in the German war effort."

However, a branch of the United German Metalworks (Vereinigte Deutsche Metallwerke, or VDM) named VDM-Halbzeugwerke in the town produced aircraft parts for constant speed propellers, landing gear and aircraft engines, others were producing fuzes and tank parts (Senking-Factory), torpedoes (Ahlborn AG) and rubber products such as lifejackets and inflatable dinghies (Wetzell Gummiwerke). In the Hildesheim forest southwest of the city a subsidiary of Robert Bosch GmbH with the code name "ELFI" (Elektro- und Feinmechanische Industrie, Electrical and Precision Engineering Industry; from 1942 to 1952: Trillke-Factory) manufactured starters, generators and other components for truck and tank engines. There was also a goods station/marshalling (classification) yard in Hildesheim.

== July 29, 1944 ==
During the first air raid on Hildesheim the sugar refinery received heavy damage and the marshalling yard was slightly damaged. 34 people were killed. The city itself remained undamaged.

== August 12, 1944 ==
Twenty explosive and 80 incendiary bombs were dropped on Hildesheim at night. The sugar refinery was damaged again and VDM were slightly damaged. A few bombs hit Südstadt, a residential area in the southern part of the city where one house was destroyed and five heavily damaged. Several bombs hit the camp where POWs were sleeping and 10 of them were killed.

== November 26, 1944 ==
Between 11 am and 1:30 pm a few bombs were dropped on the forests in the west of Hildesheim and on the city itself. Hildesheim was probably an alternate target. Nobody was killed, but a few houses were damaged in the city centre, which was hit for the first time. One house was destroyed in Steinbergviertel, a residential area in the southwestern part of Hildesheim.

== February 13, 1945 ==
An aerial mine was dropped on a tennis court at night. Nobody was killed, but hundreds of roofs were damaged in the city centre and in the southern and southwestern residential areas.

== February 22, 1945 (Operation Clarion) ==
As part of the Allied Operation Clarion (destruction of German traffic centres in smaller cities) the marshalling yard in Hildesheim was targeted in the afternoon of February 22, 1945. Due to good weather and clear sight the marshalling yard was heavily damaged, the city itself received considerable damage: 102 houses were destroyed, and 106 houses and two churches (St. Bernward's Church and St. Lamberti Church) suffered severe damage. 998 houses and four churches, among them the Cathedral and Saint Michael's Church which were declared World Heritage Site in 1985, were slightly damaged. About 250 people were killed.

== March 3, 1945 ==
On March 3, 1945, Hildesheim was an alternate target when the city of Braunschweig was bombed. A total of 583 explosive bombs were dropped on Oststadt, a residential area in the eastern part of the city. 51 houses were destroyed and 58 suffered severe damage. 22 houses were slightly damaged and 52 people were killed.

== March 14, 1945 ==
On March 14, 1945, elements of the 1st Air Division bombed several targets in the area around Hanover. Among these targets were VDM and again the marshalling yard in Hildesheim. While the marshalling yard was hit hard again and disabled for several days, the bombers missed VDM and instead bombed the Senking metal works, destroying the factory. About 150 people were killed, including 60 POWs. In the city itself, 18 houses were destroyed and 20 suffered severe damage. 109 houses were slightly damaged.

== March 22, 1945 ==
On March 22, 1945, Hildesheim was the key target of the Allied Bomber Command. British and Canadian bomber aircraft were ordered "to destroy built up area with associated industries and railway facilities." At 2 am about 250 bomber aircraft started the attack. In the following 15 minutes, they dropped a total of 445.8 tonnes (983,000 lb) of high explosive and 634 tonnes (1,398,000 lb) of incendiary bombs. Almost 74% of the buildings in Hildesheim were destroyed or damaged during the attack, including nearly the entire historical city centre. 26.8% of the houses remained undamaged. The Cathedral, Saint Michael's Church and St. Lamberti were destroyed, among others. The centre, which had retained its medieval character until then, was almost levelled. Although the famous historic centre had little military significance, two months before the end of the war in Europe it was chosen to be destroyed in order to shatter the will to defend as part of the area bombing directive.

Around 1,500 civilians were killed in the March attacks. About 500 of them could not be identified.

== After the war ==
Hildesheim after March 22, 1945

As people were suffering, 34,000 people or 46% of the city's population had remained homeless. Reconstruction started on 12 June 1945 when the first ruins were demolished, and the first houses were rebuilt on 26 June 1945. By February 1947 350 houses had been rebuilt.

As in many cities, preference was given to build housing quickly, and concrete structures took the place of the destroyed buildings. The churches, two of them now UNESCO World Heritage Sites, were all rebuilt in the original style after the war. The reconstruction of the Cathedral took ten years (1950–1960). Saint Michael's Church, another World Heritage Site, was rebuilt from 1946 to 1960. During the war, valuable world heritage had been hidden in the basement of the city wall. In the 1980s a reconstruction of the historic centre began. Some of the unattractive concrete buildings around the historic market place were torn down and replaced by replicas of the Butchers' Guild Hall and the other original buildings. In the fall of 2007, a decision was made to reconstruct the Upended Sugarloaf (Umgestülpter Zuckerhut), an iconic half-timbered house famous for its unusual shape. It was completed in October 2010.
