= St. Nicholas' Chapel, Hildesheim =

Church building in Hildesheim, Germany

Coordinates: 52°08′45″N 9°56′58″E

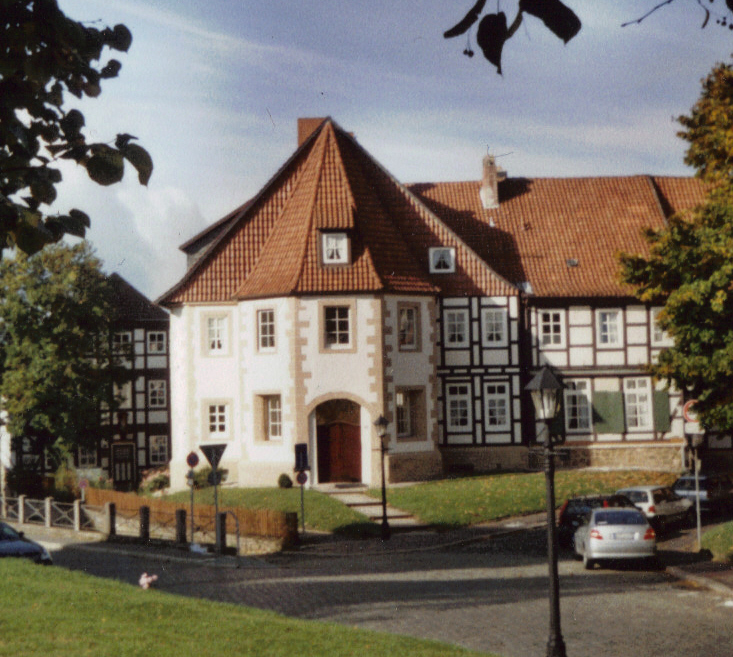
View from the east.

St. Nicholas' Chapel (German: Nikolaikapelle) is a former Roman Catholic parish church in the city of Hildesheim in Lower Saxony, Germany. It is dedicated to Saint Nicholas and is located in the southern part of the old city centre, opposite St. Godehard.

== History ==
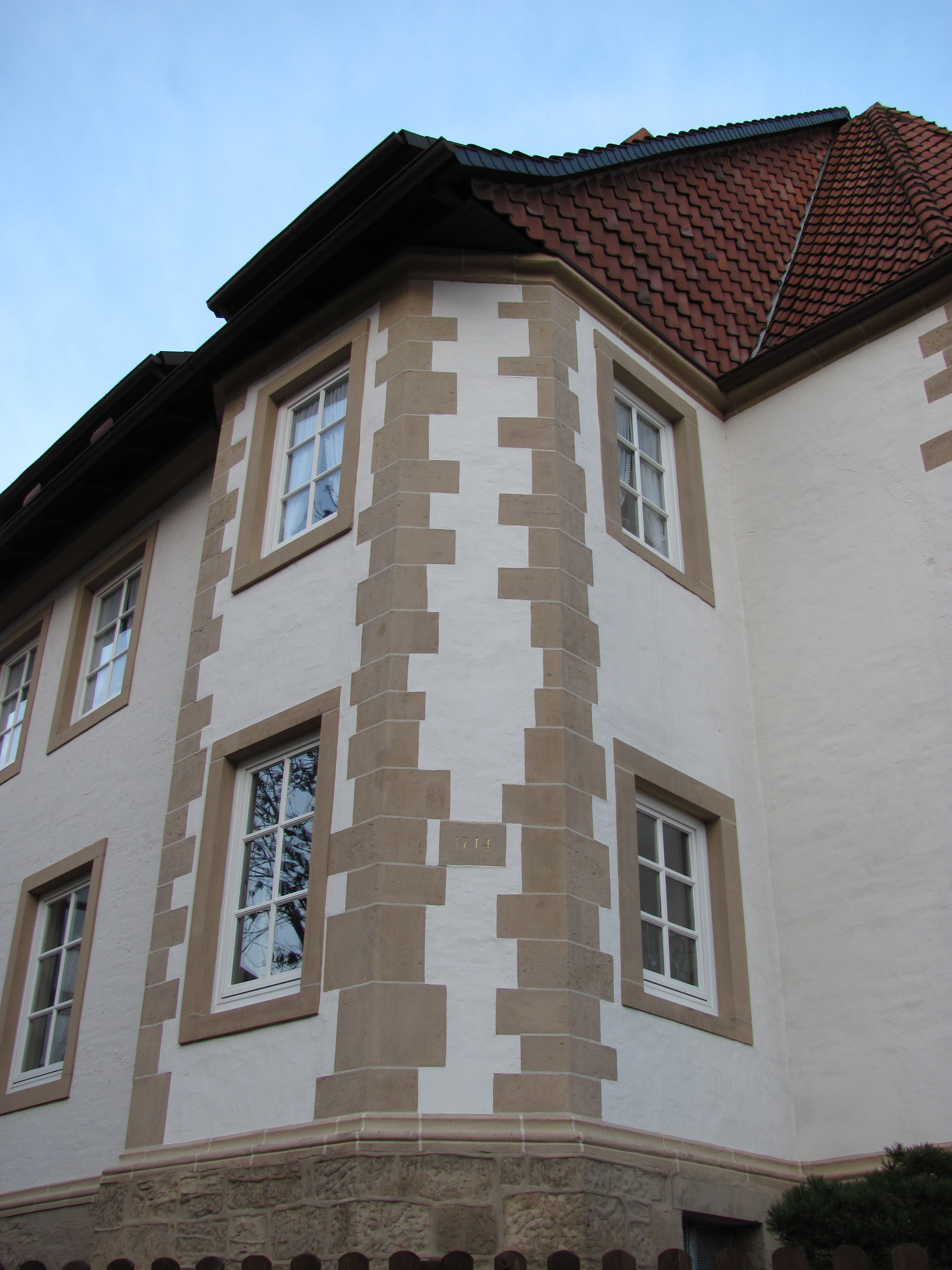
Southern wall with stone inscription.

Saint Nicolas' Chapel was built in a Romanesque style in the 12th century at the same time as the monastery of Saint Godehard was built opposite. It was consecrated by Heinrich von Minden, the bishop of Minden, in 1146. Bernard of Hildesheim (1130–53), the then bishop of Hildesheim was not able to consecrate it himself as he had become blind. Saint Nicolai's Chapel was used as a catholic parish church until 1542 when Protestantism was introduced in Hildesheim. Many inhabitants of the city, however, did not become Protestants. Saint Nicolai's Chapel, one of the smallest churches in Hildesheim, was allocated to the Protestants, who actually did not need it. At first, they used it as a stable. The church was not used as such until 1557, and there were plans to demolish it and to use the stones to repair the medieval city wall. As the monks living opposite the chapel in the monastery of St Godehard opposed the plans, St. Nicolai's Chapel was returned to the Catholic Church in 1557, but it was in very bad condition. It was renovated at various times. According to an engraving by Merian dating from 1653, it was an aisleless church with a hip roof and a flèche.

The chapel was used by the monastery until 1803. In that year, it was sold to a private owner after the monastery had been dissolved during the secularization and it was transformed into a residential building.

During World War II, St. Nicolai's Chapel was slightly damaged by bombs on 22 February 1945. On 22 March 1945, however, the chapel was hit by incendiary bombs and burnt down. Only the walls remained standing, but the neighbouring half-timbered houses remained almost undamaged. St. Nicolai's Chapel was rebuilt in its original style in 1967 and is still used for residential purposes.

== Architecture ==
Saint Nicolas' Chapel, though today a residential building, is still recognizable as a former church which facaded to the west. It was a comparatively small church consisting of one nave with a vault. The apse with its tented roof is in the east of the building. A part of the nave is preserved as well. The year 1714, which possibly refers to a renovation, is carved into the sandstone of the southern wall.

The building is on the corner of Hinterer Brühl and Godehardsplatz, two of the most sightworthy streets of Hildesheim, and it is surrounded by half-timbered houses which were built in the 16th, 17th and 18th centuries. The large half-timbered house behind is a former hospital, Hospital zu den Fünf Wunden (Hospital of the Five Wounds), dating from 1770.
