= Hospital of the Five Wounds, Hildesheim =

Coordinates: 52.14562°N 9.94879°E

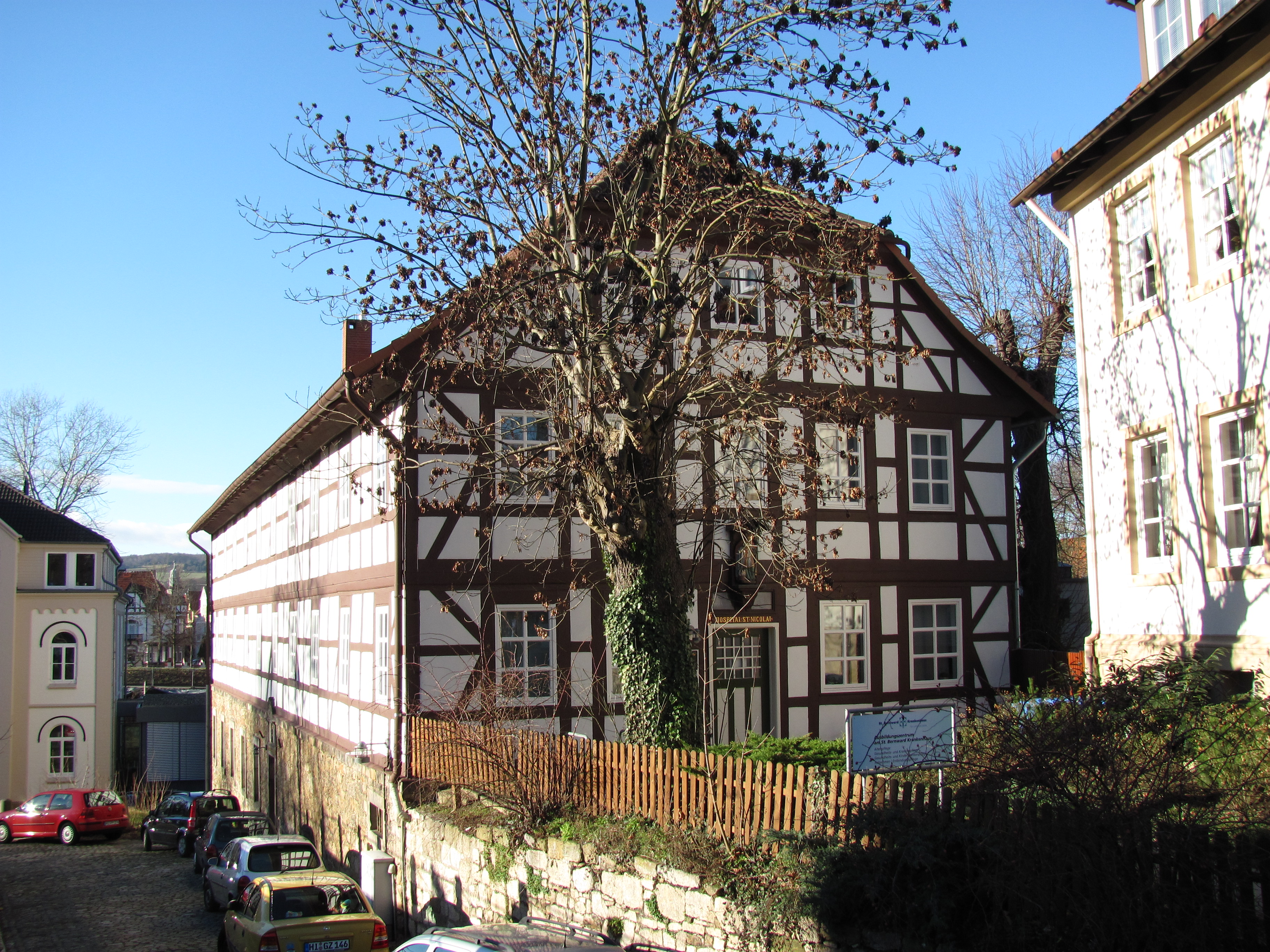
View from the east.

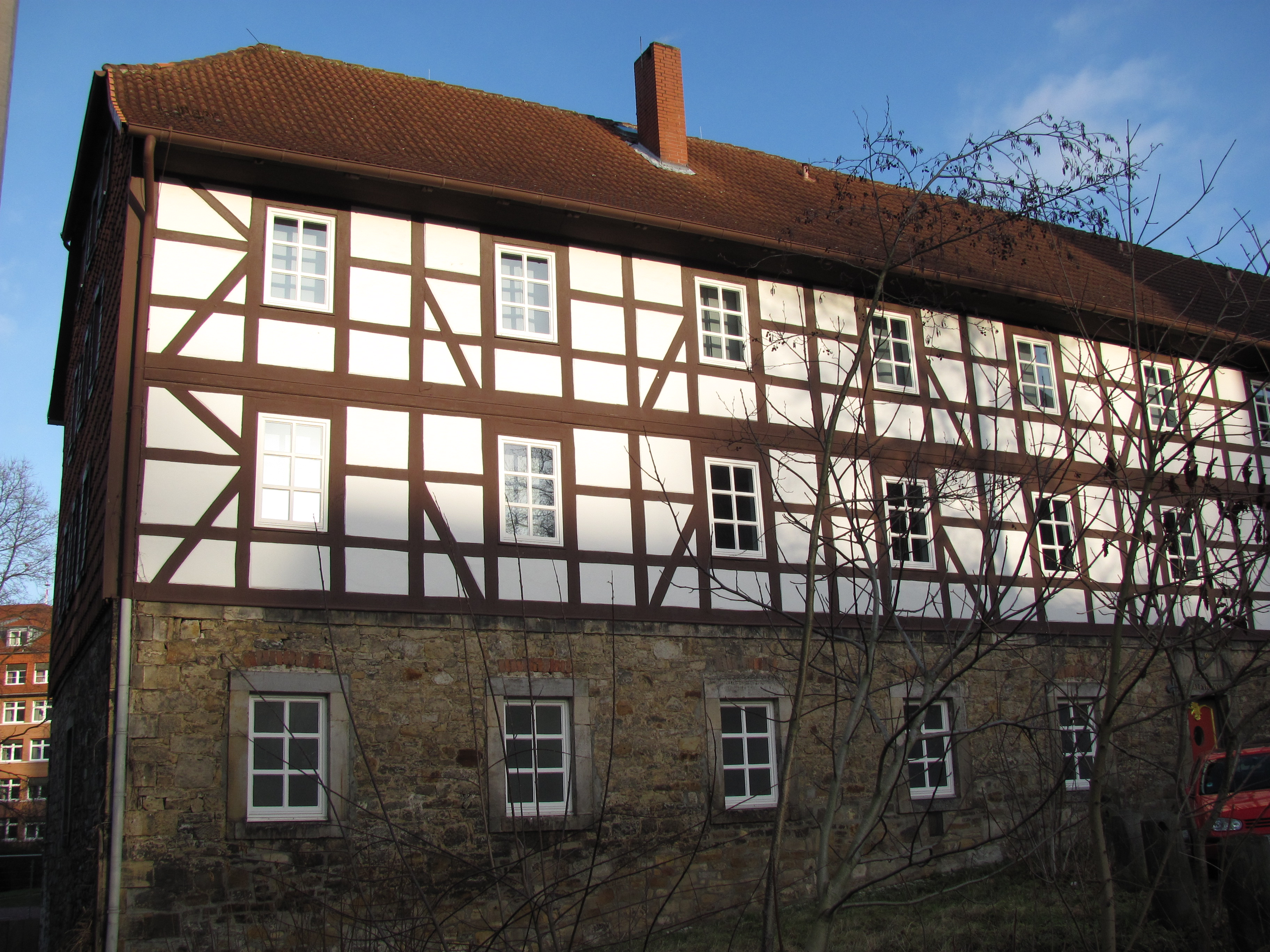
View from the south.

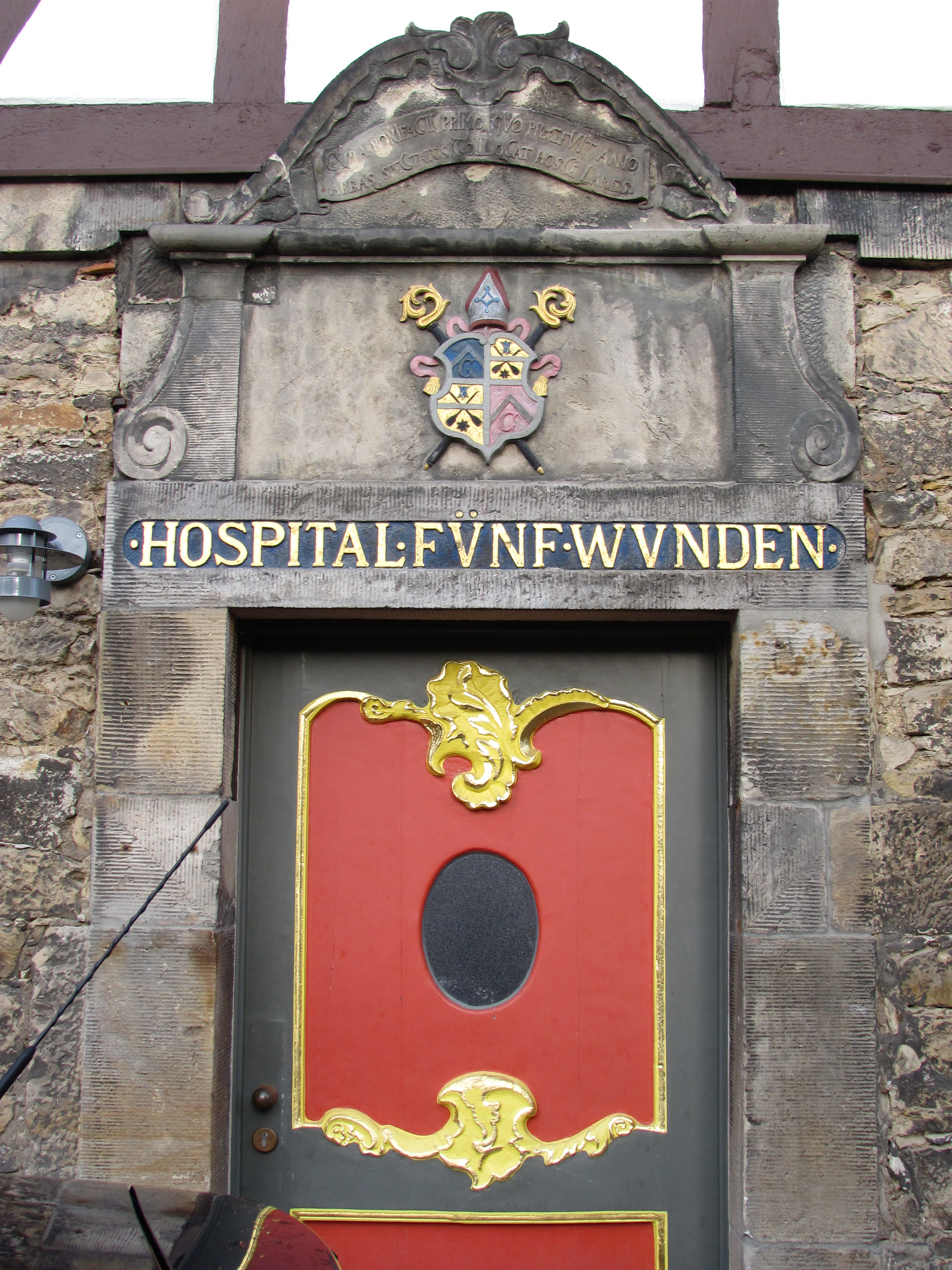
Baroque portal.

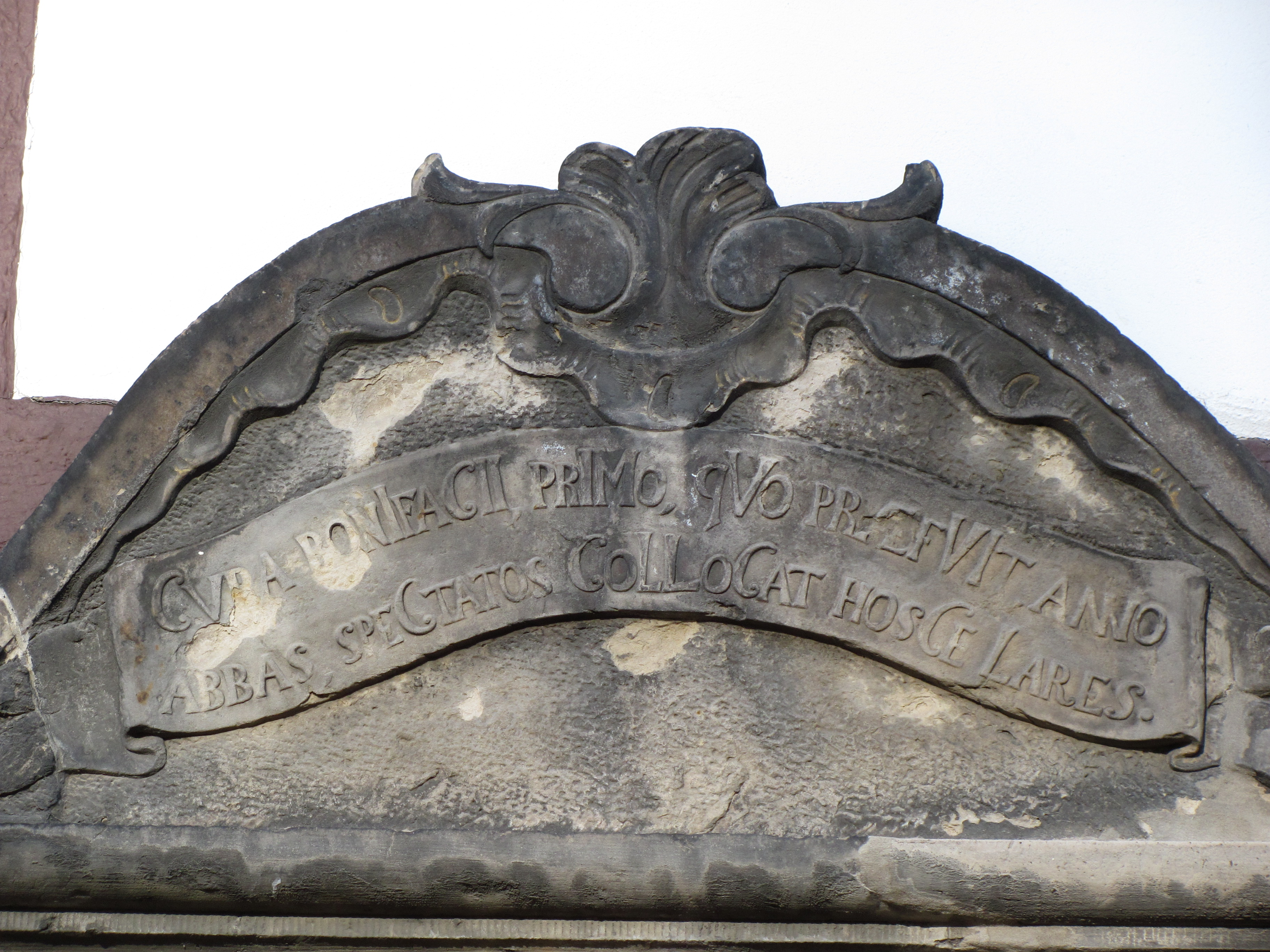
Chronogram above the portal.

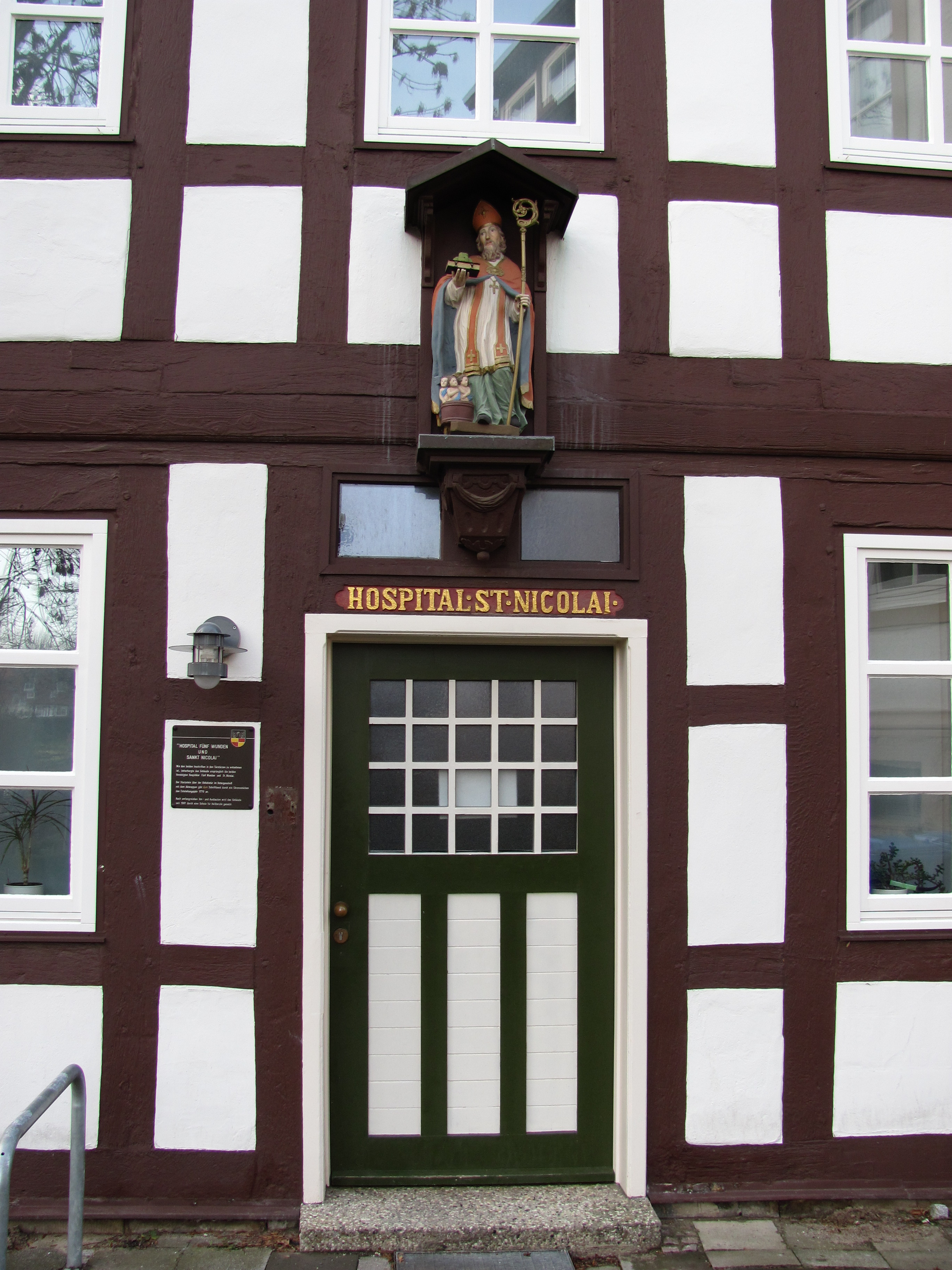
Statue of St. Nicolai.

The Hospital of the Five Wounds is a half-timbered house in the city of Hildesheim in Lower Saxony, Germany. It is in the southern part of the old city center, opposite St. Godehard and behind St. Nicolai's Chapel.

== History ==
In 1770, a large half-timbered house was built in Hildesheim to house two different hospitals which had already been founded several centuries before. The ground floor was given to the Hospital zu den Fünf Wunden (Hospital of the Five Wounds) and the upper floors to the Hospital Sankt Nicolai (Hospital St. Nicolai). Later, both hospitals were united to form the Vereinigte Hospitäler (United Hospitals). The building, however, kept the name Hospital zu den Fünf Wunden. The name derives from devotion to the holy wounds inflicted on Jesus during the crucifixion, a pious practice traditionally associated with works of mercy and social justice (in reformation England the Pilgrimage of Grace was undertaken by Catholics protesting their loss of charitable institutions and religious freedoms, under a similar patronage). From the 19th century on, the building was used by a nearby Catholic hospital which still exists today.

During World War II, the Hospital of the Five Wounds was only slightly damaged by bombs on 22 February 1945 and on 22 March 1945, and the damage could be repaired very soon. The building was renovated in 1981. Today it is used as a training college for nurses.

== Architecture ==
The Hospital of the Five Wounds is one of the largest half-timbered houses in Hildesheim. The address is Godehardsplatz 9–11 which is a large square in front of the Romanesque St. Godehard, but actually it is in a small and rather steep side lane. The building has four floors and a half-hip roof.

The ground floor which was built of rubblestones has a representative baroque portal above which the year of construction (1770) is indicated in Latin in a noteworthy chronogram:

CVra BonIfaCII, prIMo, qVo praefVIt Anno Abbas SpeCtatos CoLLoCat HosCe Lares.

One M = 1000, six C = 6 x 100 = 600, three L = 3 x 50 = 150, three V = 3 x 5 = 15, five I = 5 x 1 = 5, 1770 altogether.

Above the portal, which was the main entrance of the building, the coat of arms of an abbot can be seen as well. The upper floors, which housed the St. Nicolai Hospital, were built in a half-timbered style. This hospital had its own entrance in the east of the building where a statue of the patron saint can be seen.
