= Chronogram =

Inscription whereby specific letters stand for a date

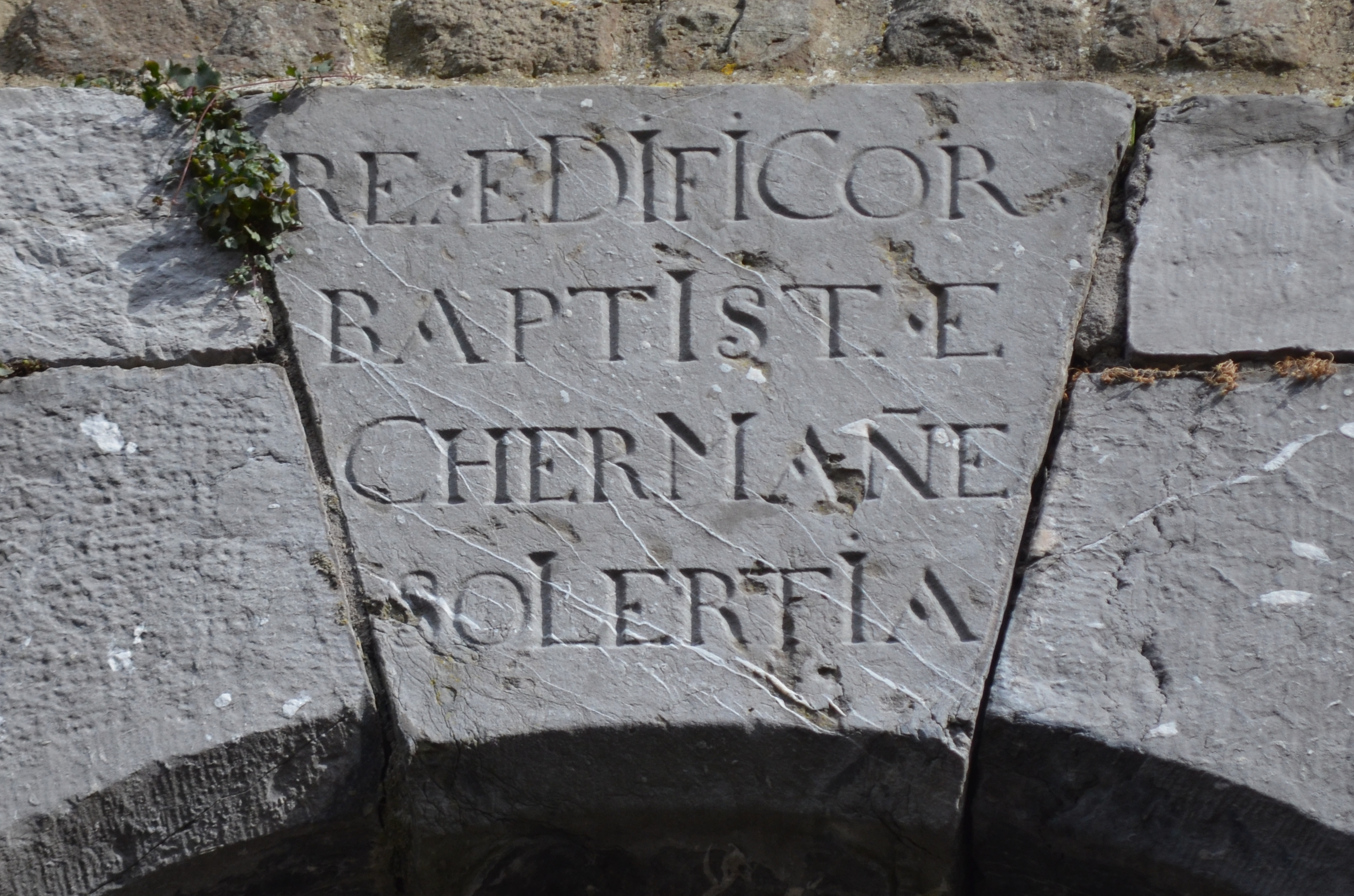
Chronogram on the Belfry of Thuin in Belgium: " reæDIfICor baptIstæ CherMan̄e soLertIa"

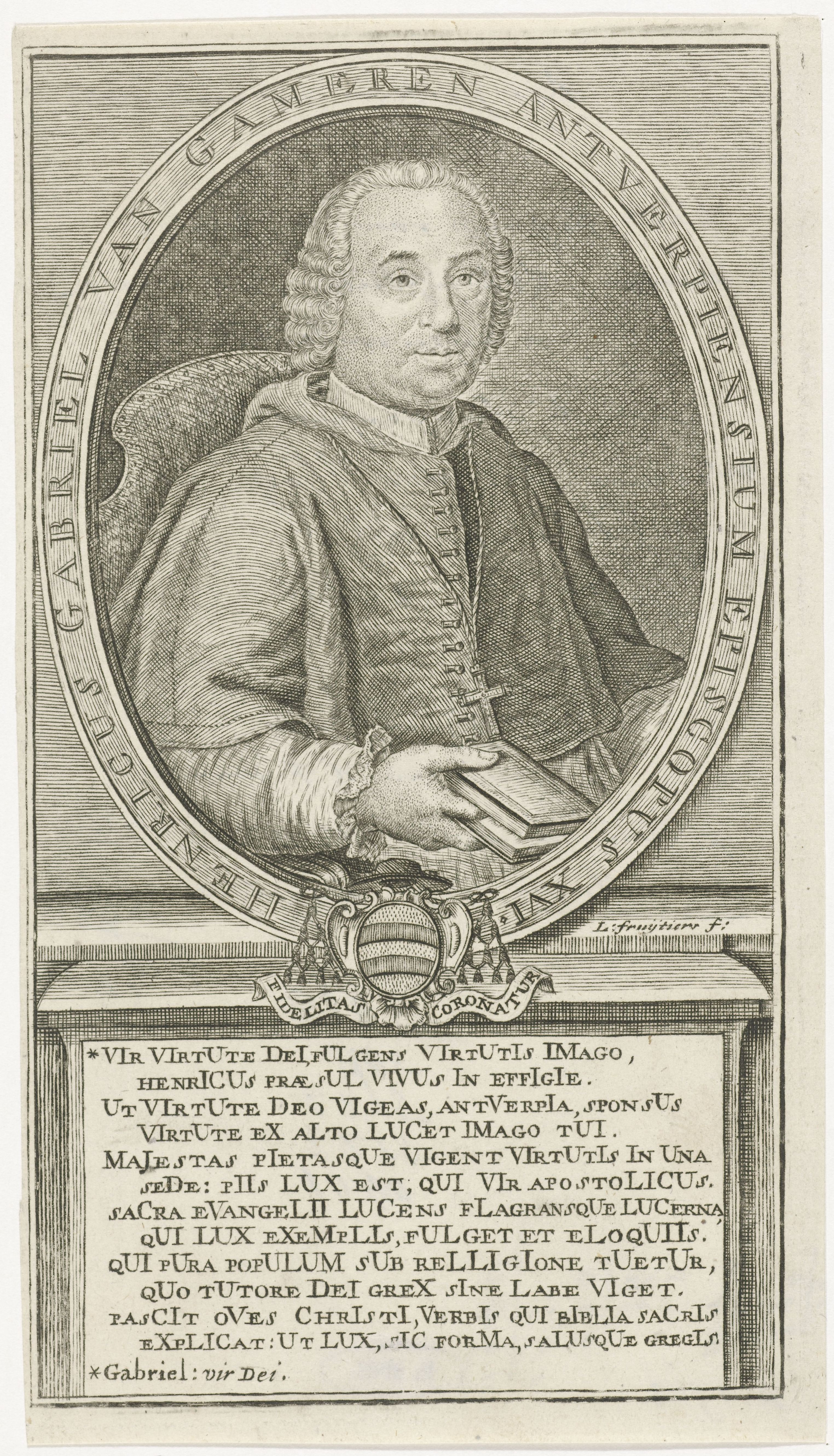
Portrait of Henry van Gameren, with Chronogram

A chronogram is a sentence or inscription in which specific letters, interpreted as numerals (such as Roman numerals), stand for a particular date when rearranged. The word, meaning "time writing", derives from the Greek words chronos (χρόνος "time") and gramma (γράμμα, "letter").

In the pure chronogram, each word contains a numeral; the natural chronogram shows all numerals in the correct numerical order, e.g. AMORE MATVRITAS = MMVI = 2006. Chronograms in versification are referred to as chronosticha if they are written in hexameter and chronodisticha if they are written in distich.

In the ancient Indonesian Hindu-Buddhist tradition, especially in ancient Java, chronograms were called chandrasengkala and usually used in inscriptions to signify a given year in the Saka calendar. Certain words were assigned their specific number, and poetic phrases were formed from these selected words to describe particular events that have their own numerical meanings. For example, the chandrasengkala "sirna ilang kertaning bumi" ("the wealth of earth disappeared and diminished") (sirna = 0, ilang = 0, kerta = 4, bumi = 1) corresponds to the year 1400 in the Saka calendar (1478 CE), the date of the fall of the Majapahit Empire.

== Roman numerals ==
Chronograms from the Roman Empire are reported but not confirmed. The earliest confirmed chronograms using Roman numerals were devised in the mid 14th century but retrospective chronograms which express earlier dates are known. Chronograms were particularly popular during the Renaissance, when chronograms were often used on tombstones and foundation stones to mark the date of the event being commemorated. They were popular during the Baroque as well. In 1711, Joseph Addison compared chronograms to "anagrams and acrostics". Examples include:

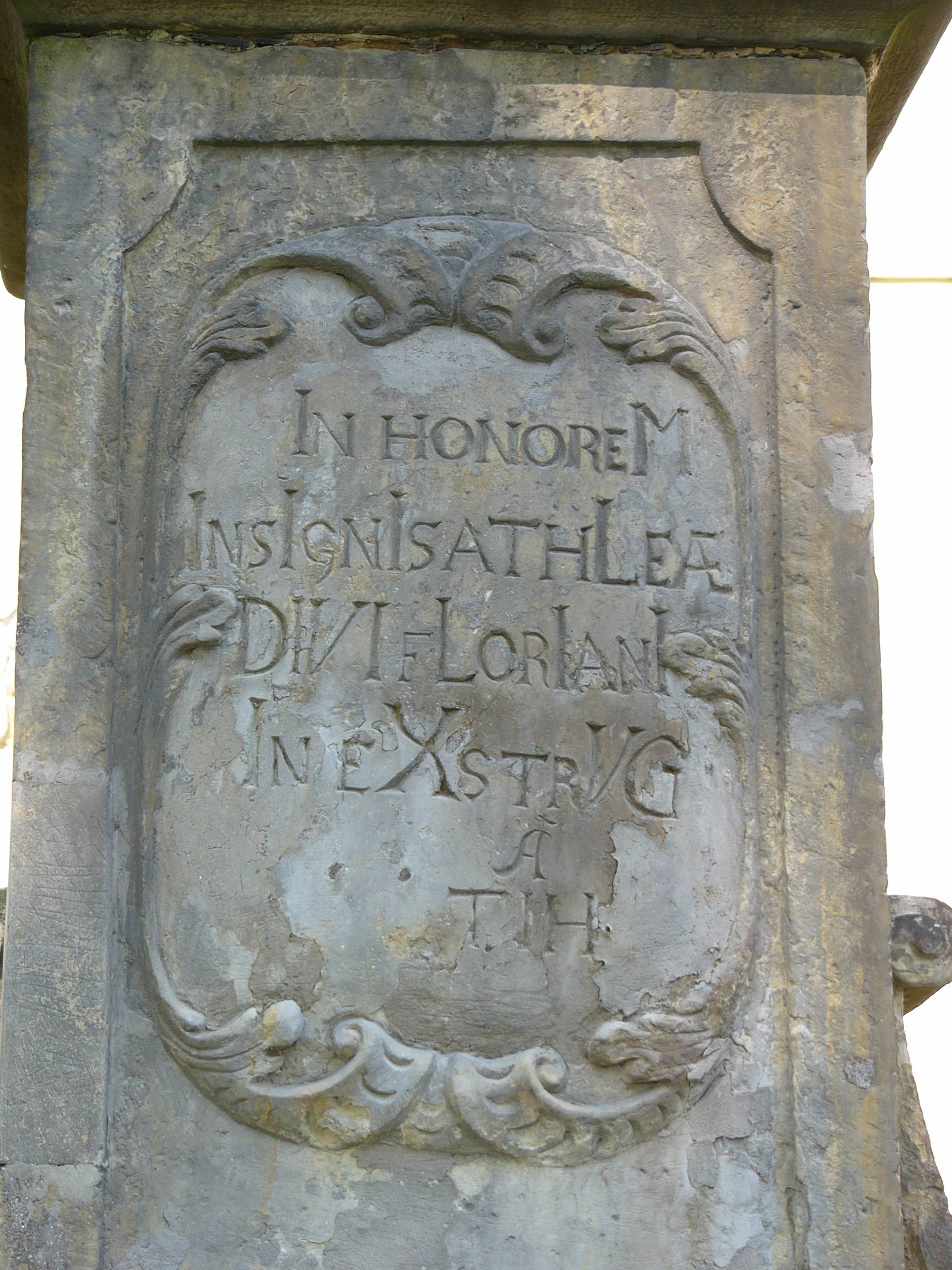
Chronogram at a statue in Dolany, Czech Republic. In honoreM InsIgnIs athLetae DIVI fLorIanI IneXstrVCta 1729

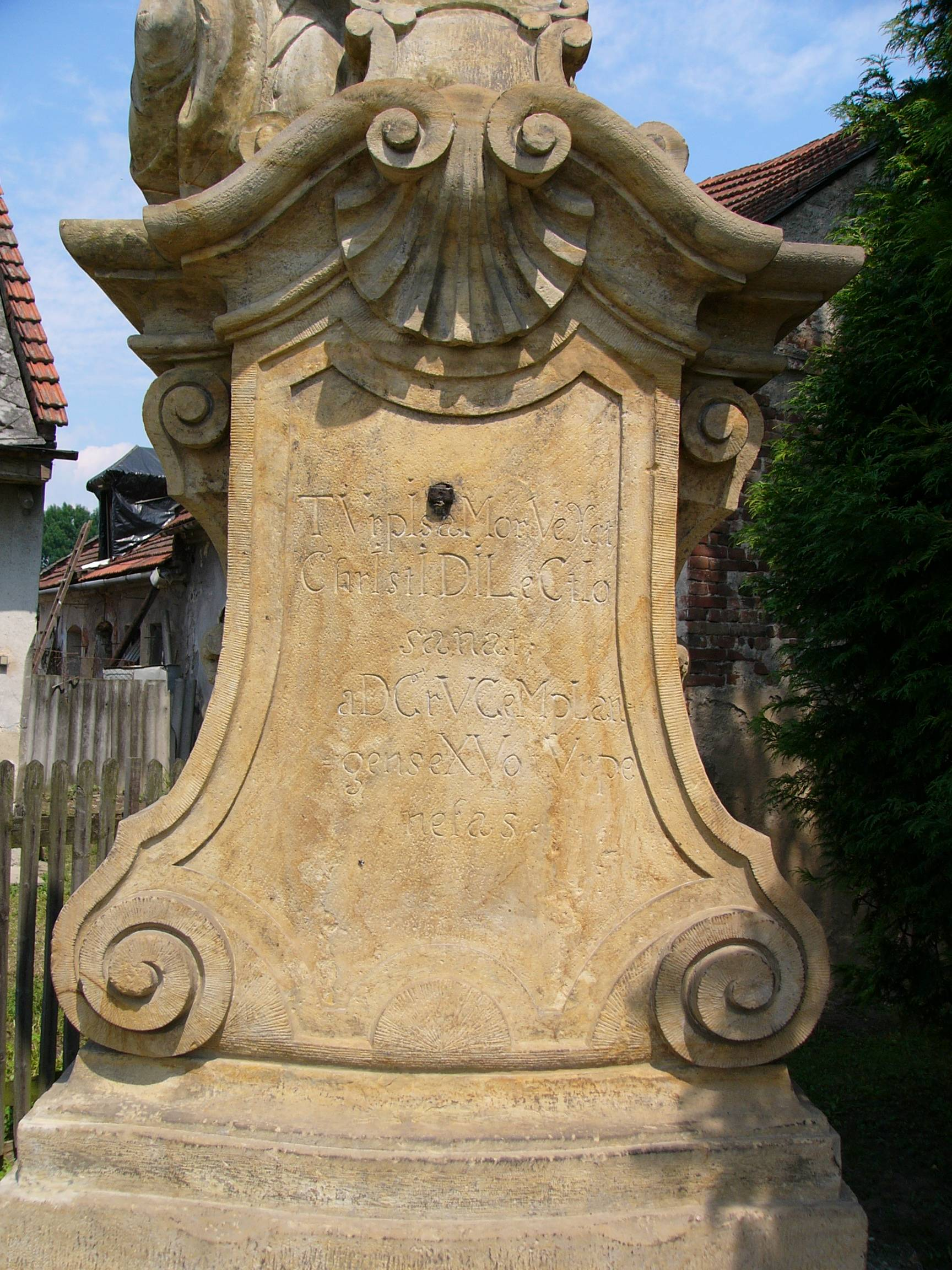
Chronogram at cross in Uničov, Czech Republic. TVrpIs aMor VeXat ChrIstI DILeCtIo sanat aD CrVCeM pLan- gens eXVo tVrpe nefas 1775

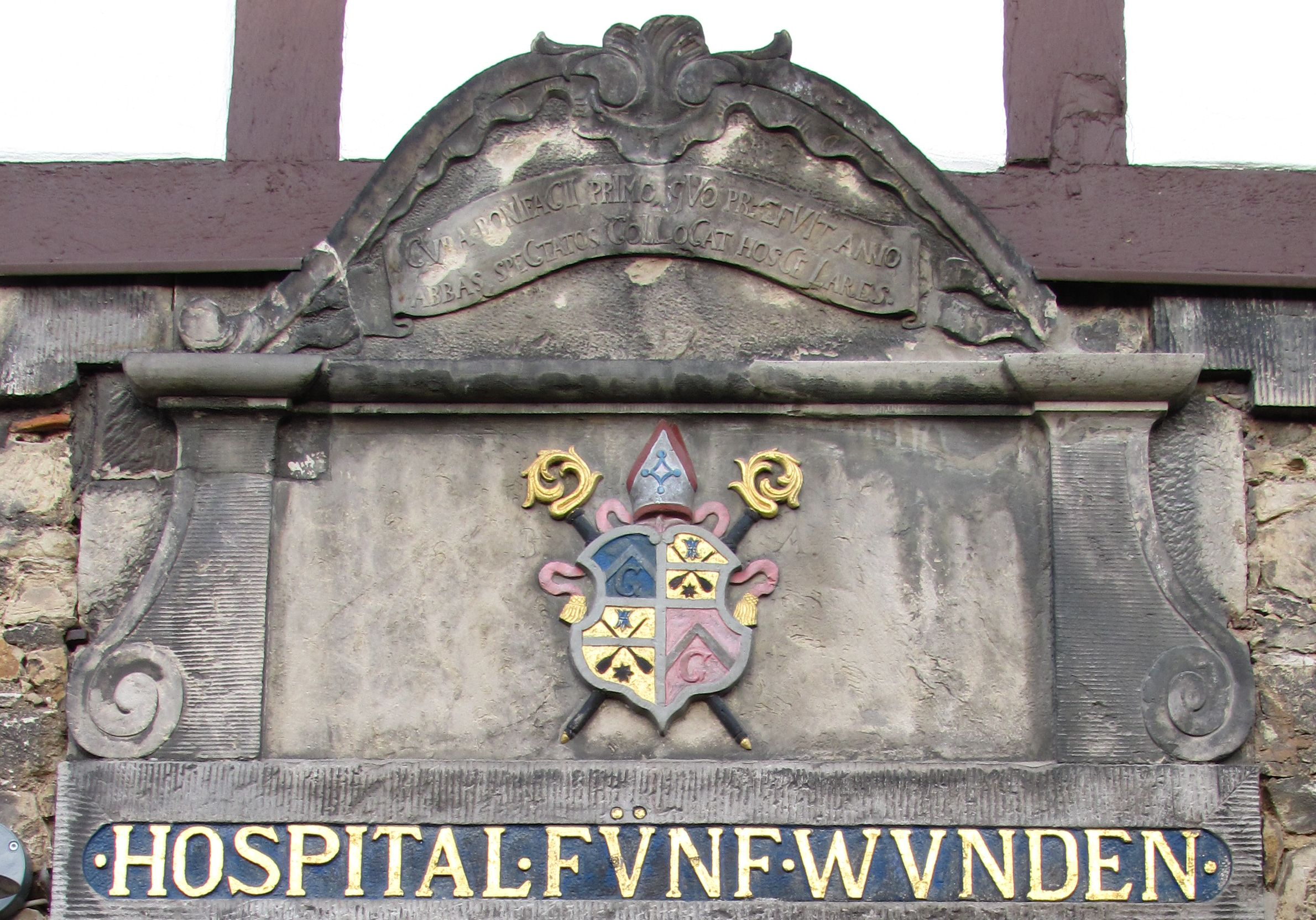
Chronogram above the entrance of the Hospital of the Five Wounds in Hildesheim, Germany. CVra BonIfaCII, PrIMo, QVo PraefVIt Anno Abbas SpeCtatos CoLLoCat HosCe Lares. 1770.

- My Day Closed Is In Immortality is a chronogram commemorating the death of Queen Elizabeth I of England. The initial letters of the words read MDCIII, which corresponds to 1603, the year of Elizabeth's death.
- ChrIstVs DuX ergo trIVMphVs ("Christ the Leader so a triumph"), on a coin struck by Gustavus Adolphus in 1627, gives MDCXVVVII or 1627. Although chronograms are relatively scarce on coins, many inscriptions on medals incorporate chronograms.
- In a work entitled Hugo Grotius his Sophompaneas, published in 1652, the date is indicated by the author's name: FranCIs GoLDsMIth. This gives MDCLII or 1652.
- An example of a short chronogram is on the monument commemorating the 1764 Massacre at Madéfalva in Transsylvania. The script Siculicidium (in Latin, meaning "murder of Székelys") written SICVLICIDIVM, gives exactly 1764. (Note: 1 (I) + 100 (C) + 5 (V) + 50 (L) + 1 (I) + 100 (C) + 1 (I) + 500 (D) + 1 (I) + 5 (V) + 1000 (M) = 1764) Only the beginning letter "S" is not used from the one-word chronogram.

Many lengthy examples of chronograms can be found in Germany and the countries that had been part of the Holy Roman Empire, such as Austria, the Czech Republic, Hungary and Slovakia. These often commemorate the building of houses in the form of prayers or quotations from the Bible. For instance, SVRGE O IEHOVA ATQVE DISPERGE INIMICOS TVOS ("Rise, oh Jehovah, and destroy your enemies", a slightly altered version of Psalm 68:2) gives 1625 as the year of building. One double chronogram, in Latin and English, on the year 1642, reads, "'TV DeVs IaM propItIVs sIs regI regnoqVe hVIC VnIVerso." – "O goD noVV sheVV faVoVr to the kIng anD thIs VVhoLe LanD." The English sentence demonstrates that the origin of the letter w as a double v or u was recognised historically. In Hildesheim in the North of Germany, the inscription "CVra BonIfaCII, PrIMo, QVo PraefVIt Anno Abbas SpeCtatos CoLLoCat Hos CeLares " showing the year 1770 can be read above the entrance of the Hospital of Five Wounds which was built in the year indicated.

Modern (1993) stealth chronogram under the balcony of the Grand Ducal Palace, Luxembourg

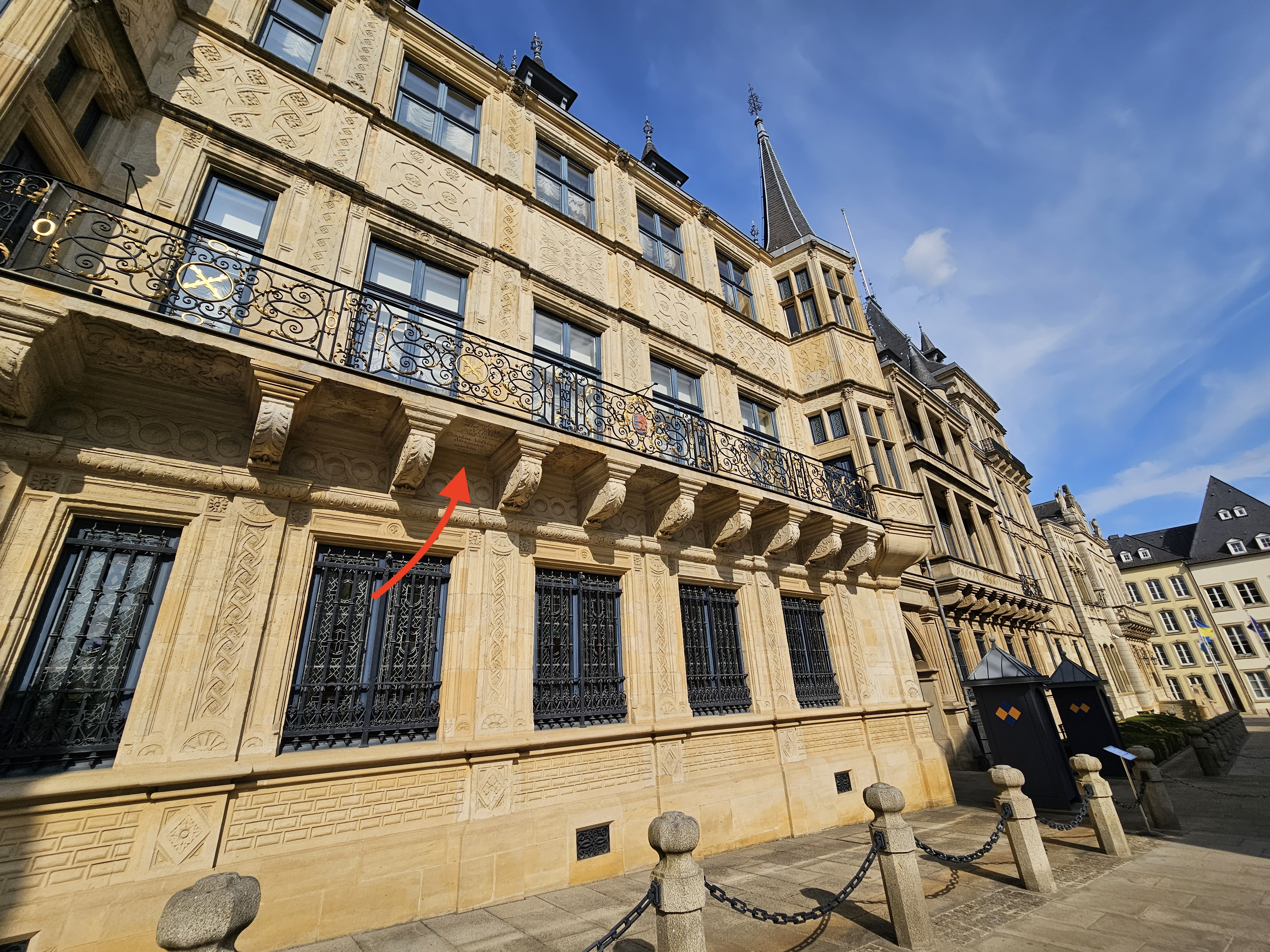
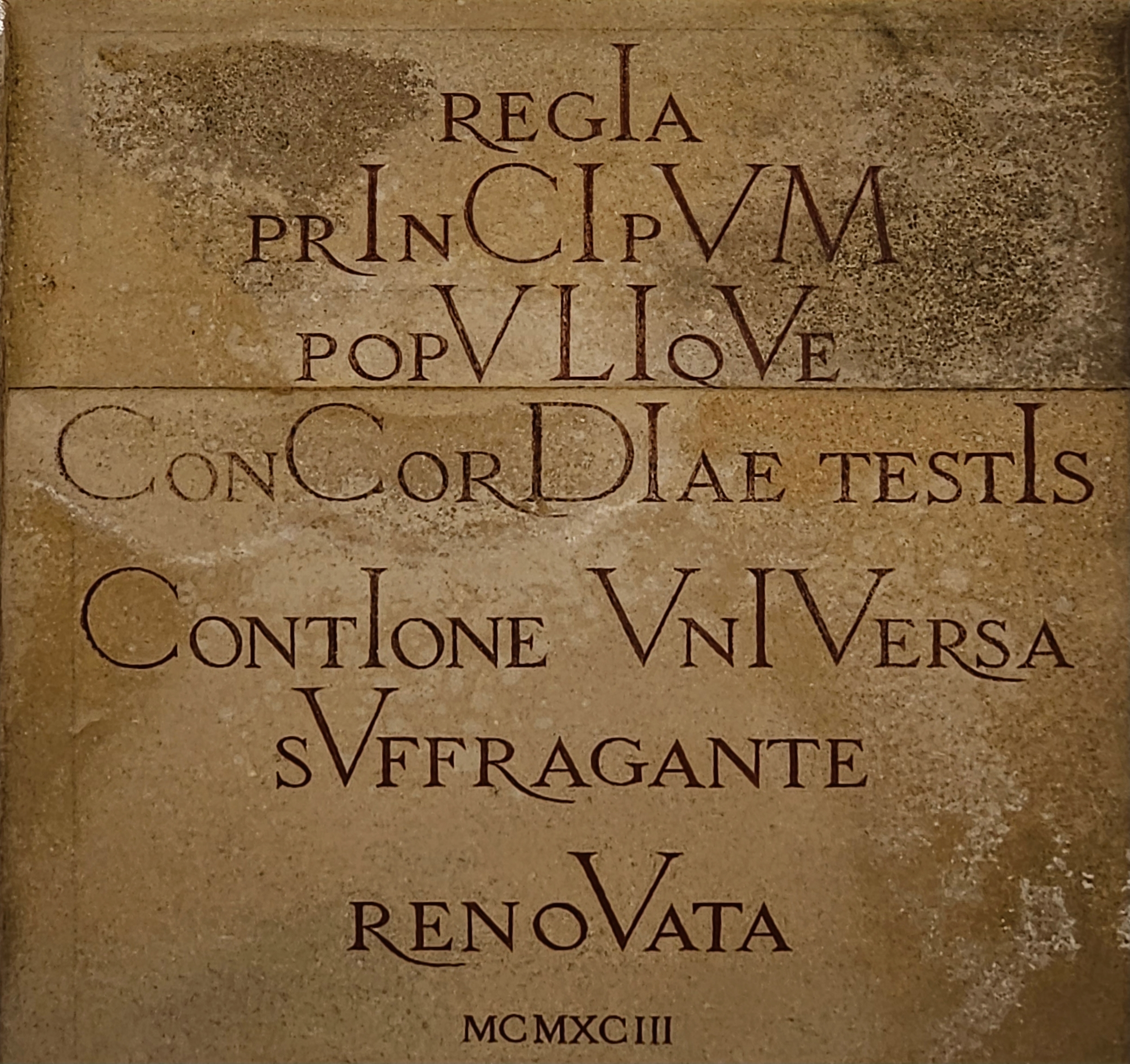

== Hebrew numerals ==
The great popularity of chronograms in Jewish tradition, and the extent to which they have been cultivated, may be explained by the fact that they are a variety of the Jewish mystical practice of Gematria.

The earliest chronogram in Jewish literature is one found in a Hebrew poem of the year 1205 by Al-Harizi, while the earliest Latin chronogram is dated five years later. According to Abraham Firkovich, Hebrew chronograms date back to 582; but the inscriptions cited by him are probably forgeries. In the thirteenth century chronograms are found in the epitaphs of German Jews (Lewysohn, "Nafshot Zaddikim", No. 14, of the year 1261; No. 16, of the year 1275).

=== In epitaphs ===
It is evident, therefore, that for a period of five hundred years chronograms occurred in the epitaphs of European Jews. Thus the dates of the epitaphs of the family of Asher ben Jehiel in the first half of the fourteenth century are indicated by chronograms (Almanzi, "Abne Zikkaron", pp. 4, 6, 9); and among sixty-eight Frankfurt epitaphs of that century four chronograms have been preserved (Horowitz, "Inschriften... zu Frankfurt-am-Main", Nos. 8, 29, 36, 68). The German Jews seem to have possessed little skill in the composition of chronograms, there being only about twenty-five (and these very simple) in a total of some 6,000 inscriptions. In Bohemia and Poland, chronograms in epitaphs occur more frequently, and are often very clever; for example, the epitaph of the physician Menahem b. Asher Mazzerato, who died at Prague in 1680, reads as follows: איש צדיק ישר חכם וענו האלוף מהר״ר מנחם רופא מומחה (Lieben, "Gal 'Ed," p. 36); and the numerical value of the marked initial letters therein amounts to 440; i.e., 5440, the Jewish year in which Menahem died. The year of death of the associate rabbi of Prague, Zalman, who perished in the great fire of 1689 (=5449 Jewish era), is indicated by the words 'באש יצא מאת ד (bolded letters equal 449) (ib. No. 59).

=== In books ===
While the epitaphs, in addition to the chronograms, in many cases directly mention the dates, many manuscripts, and an even greater number of printed books, are dated simply by means of chronograms; authors, copyists, and typographers rivaling one another in hiding the dates in intricate chronograms, most difficult to decipher. Hence, many data of Jewish bibliography still remain to be determined, or at least rectified. Down to recent times the custom of indicating dates by means of chronograms was so prevalent in Jewish literature that all but few books are dated by numerals only. In the earliest printed books the chronograms consist of one or two words only: the Soncino edition of the Talmud, for instance, has for its date the earliest printed chronogram, גמרא ("Gemara") = 244 (1484 C.E.). Words like רננו ("rejoice ye!"), שמחה ("joy"), ברנה ("with rejoicing") were especially used for this purpose, as they express happiness. Later on, entire verses of the Bible, or sentences from other books, having some reference to the contents or title of the book, or to the name of the author, publisher, printer, etc., were used. In longer sentences, in which some of the letters were not utilized in the chronogram, those that counted were marked by dots, lines, or different type, or were distinguished in other ways. Innumerable errors have been made by bibliographers because the distinguishing marks were missing or blotted, or had been omitted. To this source of confusion must be added the varying methods of indicating the "thousand" of the Jewish era. The Italian, Oriental, and earlier Amsterdam editions frequently designate the thousand as לפ״ג ( = לפרט גדול, "the major era"). The German and Polish editions omit the thousand, considering only לפ״ק ( = לפרט קטן, "the minor era"); but as neither the former nor the latter is employed throughout the respective editions, many errors arise. The following chronogram, which Rabbi Samuel Schotten adds to his work "Kos ha-Yeshu'ot" (Frankfurt, 1711), shows how artificial and verbose chronograms may be: "Let him who wishes to know the year of the Creation pour the contents out of the cup [i.e., count the word "kos," כוס with defective spelling = 80] and seek aid [ישועה = 391; together 471] in the sixth millennium." The days of the month and week are indicated in the same way.

Many important years in Jewish history are indicated by their respective chronograms; e.g., the year 1492 by מזרה ("scatterer" = 252, after Jer. xxi. 10, which says that God scattered Israel). This was the year when the Jews were expelled from Spain (Abravanel's Introduction to his Commentary on Kings).

=== In poetry ===
Neo-Hebraic poetry, which laid especial stress on the formal side of verse, also cultivated chronograms. A number of Hebrew poems were produced in the first half of the 19th century, in which the letters of each verse have the same numerical value, being generally the year in which it was written. A New-year's poem in this style, written in the year 579 (=1819), is found in Shalom Cohen's "Ketab Yosher" (ed. Warsaw, p. 146). Two years later Jacob Eichenbaum wrote a poem in honor of a friend, each line of which had the numerical value of 581 ("Kol Zimrah", ed. Leipsic, pp. 50–53). While this poem is really a work of art, in spite of the artifice employed, Eichenbaum's imitators have in their translations merely produced rhymes with certain numerical values. Gottlober (in "Ha-Kokabim", i. 31) wrote an excellent satire on these rimesters, each line of his poem having the numerical value of 618 (=1858). The first two verses of the poem are as follows:

עם הלפקים כה אריבה
ולאלה כגמול ידם להם אשיבה

But even poets like I. L. Gordon and A. B. Lewensohn have a great weakness for the לפקים ("minor eras"), though employing them only in the super-scriptions to their poems.

== Arabic numerals ==
The letters of the Arabic language also each have a numerical value, which can be used for chronograms in languages which use the Arabic alphabet.

=== In epitaphs ===
The tomb of the Persian poet Hafez in Shiraz has engraved on it the Persian words ḵāk-e moṣallā 'dust of Musalla' (Musalla was a park or pleasure ground in Shiraz made famous in Hafez's poem Shirazi Turk and other works); the letters of this phrase add up to the Islamic date 791 (equivalent to AD 1389/1390).

=== In books ===
The art of chronograms—where words or phrases are crafted so their letters, when interpreted using numerical values (such as the abjad system), reveal a specific year—has long been used in Islamic literature for recording dates of composition, events or dedications. Imam Ahmad Raza Khan was highly proficient in the science of chronograms. Not only his works, but the treatises within his works have titles in this manner; see his work Fatawa Razawiyyah. The following is just one example of his work النمیقۃ الانقی فی فرق الملاقی والملقی ("a refined treatise on the distinction between received water and poured water"), whose numerical value of the individual letters (in accordance with the abjad system, which assigns each letter of the Arabic alphabet a number) yielded the date of the work 1327 AH when added together.

The work النمیقۃ الانقی فی فرق الملاقی والملقی ("a refined treatise on the distinction between received water and poured water") yield the date of the work 1327 AH
Component	Arabic letters	Abjad values	Subtotal
النمیقۃ	ا، ل، ن، م، ی، ق، ة	1 + 30 + 50 + 40 + 10 + 100 + 5	236
الأنقی	ا، ل، ا، ن، ق، ی	1 + 30 + 1 + 50 + 100 + 10	192
فی	ف، ی	80 + 10	90
فرق	ف، ر، ق	80 + 200 + 100	380
الملاقی	ا، ل، م، ل، ا، ق، ی	1 + 30 + 40 + 30 + 1 + 100 + 10	212
والملقی	و، ا، ل، م، ل، ق، ی	6 + 1 + 30 + 40 + 30 + 100 + 10	217
Total abjad value			1327

=== In names ===
The use of chronograms in Islamic scholarship extended beyond books and epigraphs; in some cases, scholars applied this numerical symbolism to names as a way to commemorate significant dates, such as birth or death years. Just as chronograms were used in the titles of his works, they were also applied to names. In the same manner as explained above, Imam Ahmad Raza Khan chose the historical name المختار (al-Mukhtar), whose letters—when calculated using the abjad system—yield the year 1272 Hijri, corresponding to the year of his birth.

== See also ==
- Abjad numerals (Arabic chronograms)
- Isopsephy
- Sator Square (a type of acrostic)
- Ancient Hindu methods of chronograms
- Memento mori
- Vicarius Filii Dei
