= Bernard of Hildesheim =

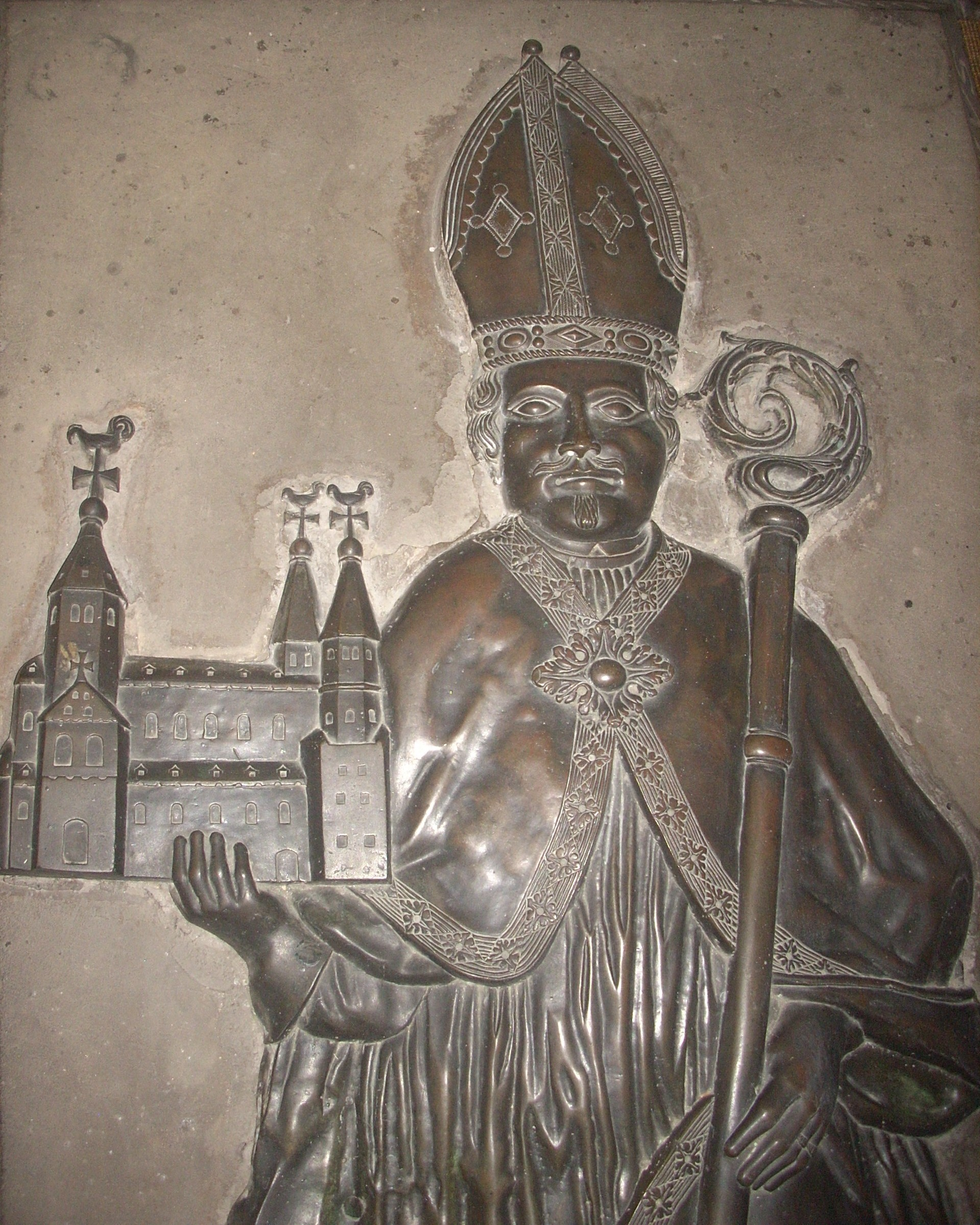
Tomb of Bishop Bernhard at the basilica St. Godehard, Hildesheim

Bernhard or Bernard(us) of Hildesheim (died 20 July 1154) was Bishop of Hildesheim from 1130 until 1153 (resigned). He achieved the canonization of Gotthard of Hildesheim by Pope Innocent II and founded the basilica St. Godehard in honour of the new Saint at Hildesheim, where he was buried. He served as Bishop for 23 years, despite being blind. He is venerated as Blessed in the Roman Catholic Church, and his feast day is 20 July.

He was a mentor of Saint Bernold, another bishop.
