= Gotthard of Hildesheim =

German bishop and Roman Catholic saint

Saint Gotthard
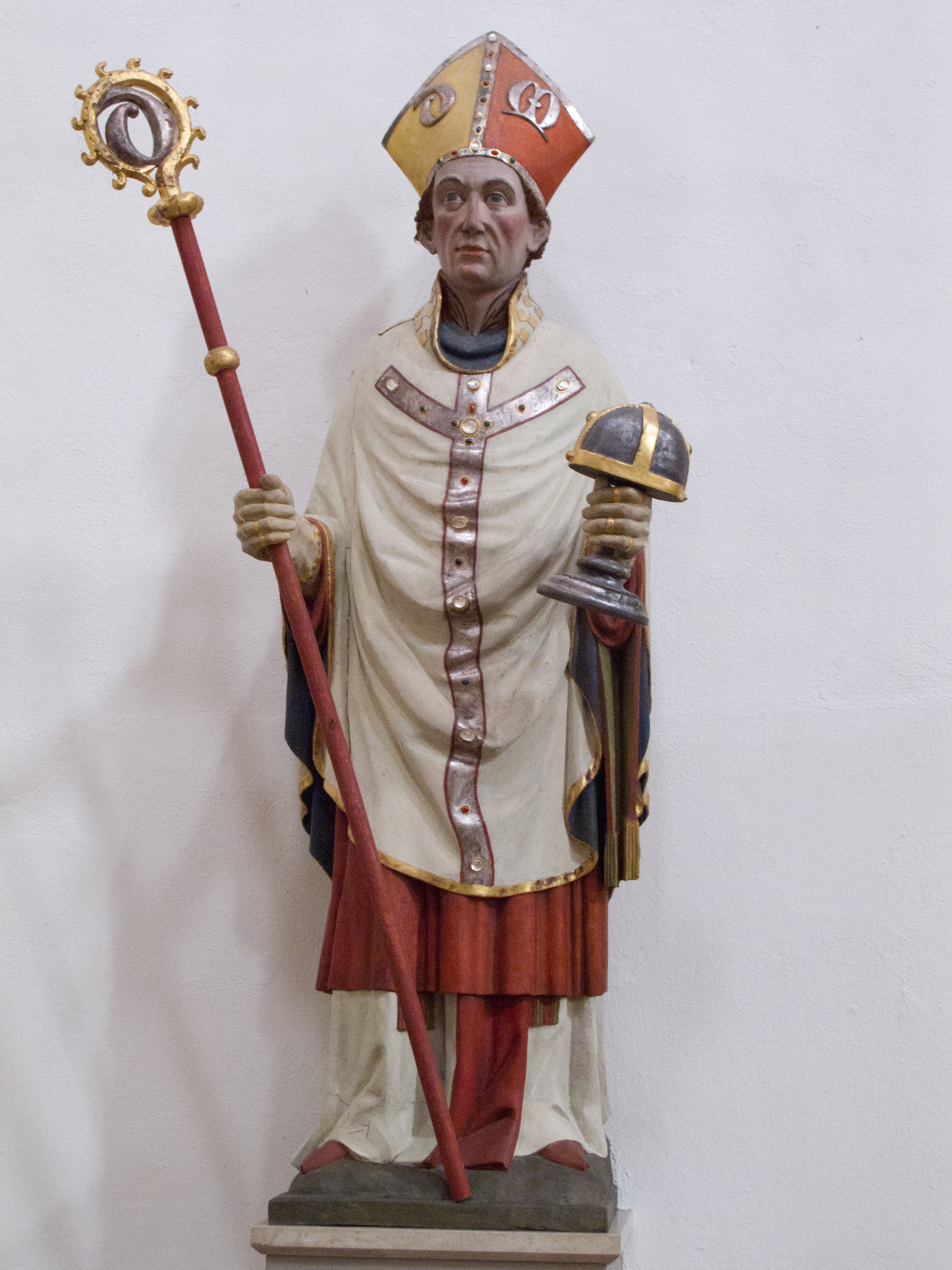
- St. Gotthard as bishop, with the Hildesheim St. Mary relic receptacle; Basilica St. Godehard, Hildesheim
- Born: 960; Reichersdorf, Bavaria
- Died: 5 May 1038
- Venerated in: Catholic Church; Eastern Orthodox Church
- Canonized: 1131, Rheims by Pope Innocent II
- Feast: 5 May
- Attributes: dragon; model of a church
- Patronage: travelling merchants; invoked against fever, dropsy, childhood sicknesses, hailstones, the pain of childbirth, and gout; invoked by those in peril of the sea

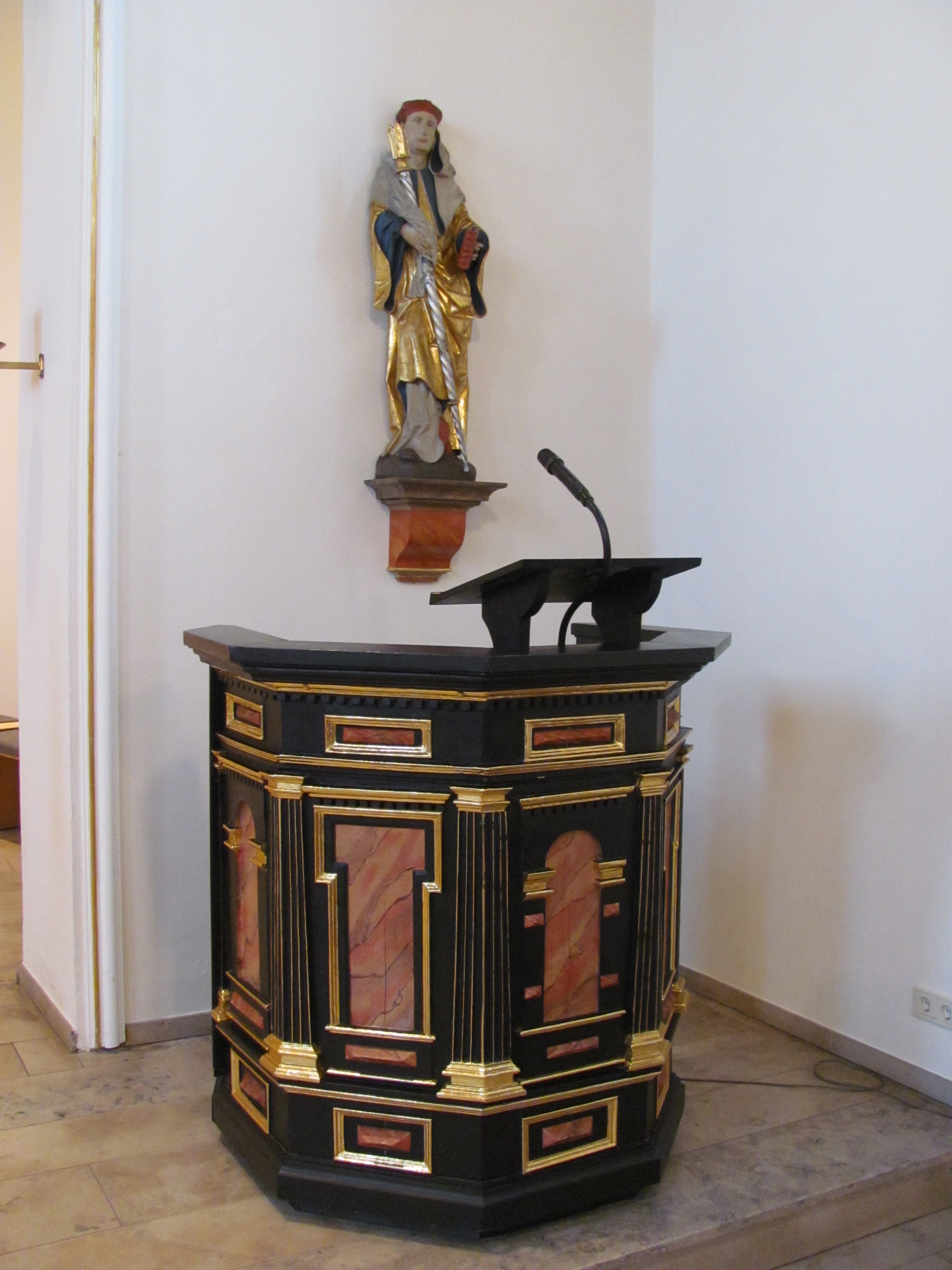
Wooden statue of St. Gotthard, carved about 1505, Cath. Church in Schellerten-Farmsen, Lower Saxony, Germany.

Gotthard (or Godehard) (960 – 5 May 1038 AD; Latin: Gotthardus, Godehardus), also known as Gothard or Godehard the Bishop, was a German bishop venerated as a saint.

== Life ==
Gotthard was born in 960 near Niederaltaich in the diocese of Passau. Gotthard studied the humanities and theology at Niederaltaich Abbey, where his father Ratmund was a vassal of the canons. While at the abbey, Gotthard became a canon under Abbot Erkanbert. Gotthard then continued his studies at the archiepiscopal court of Salzburg, where he served as an ecclesiastical administrator. After traveling through various countries, including Italy, Gotthard completed his advanced studies under the guidance of Liutfrid in the cathedral school at Passau. He then joined the canons at Niederaltaich and was appointed provost.

When Henry II of Bavaria decided to transform the chapter house of Niederaltaich into a Benedictine monastery Gotthard remained there as a novice, subsequently becoming a monk there in 990 under the abbot Ercanbertn. In 993, Gotthard was ordained a priest, and later became prior and rector of the monastic school. Duke Henry was present at Gotthard's installation as abbot in 996.

Gotthard was a dedicated reformer and introduced the Cluniac reforms at Niederaltaich. He helped revive the Rule of St. Benedict, and then trained abbots for the abbeys of Tegernsee, Hersfeld and Kremsmünster to restore Benedictine observance, under the patronage of Henry II, Holy Roman Emperor.

He succeeded Bernward as bishop of Hildesheim on 2 December 1022, being consecrated by Aribo, Archbishop of Mainz. During the 15 years of his episcopal government, while earning the respect of the clergy. He was particularly interested in the education of the young clergy, and he started several schools. The cathedral school in Hildesheim became under him a center for learning. Gotthard ordered the construction of some 30 churches. He founded a monastery beside the chapel on the Zierenberg about 1025 and had a church built there which was dedicated to Saint Maurice and consecrated in 1028.

Despite his advanced age, he defended the rights of his diocese vigorously. After a brief sickness, he died on 5 May 1038 at the "Mauritiusstift", the hospice for travelers which he had founded.

== Veneration ==
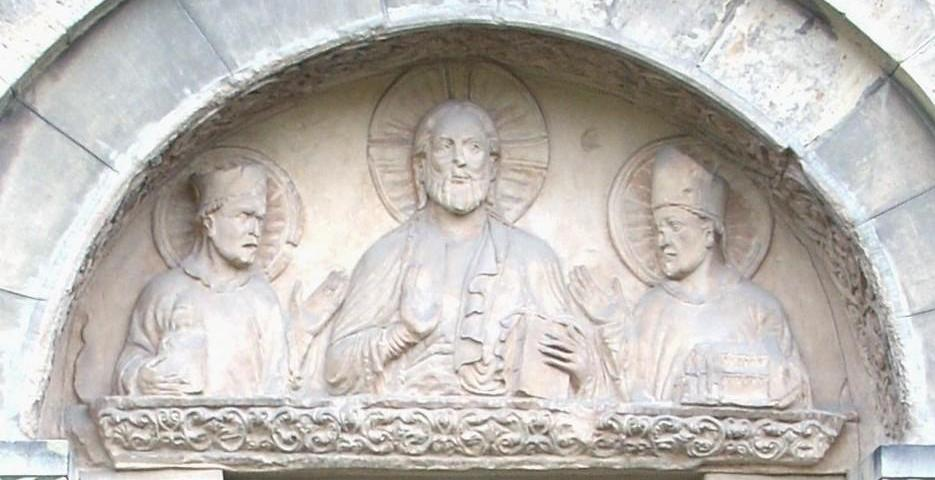
Tympanum depicting Christ, Gotthard and Epiphanius. Hildesheim, St. Godehard Basilica.

Gotthard's successors in the episcopate of Hildesheim, Bertold (1119–30) and Bernhard I (1130–53), pushed for his canonization. This was accomplished during the episcopate of Bernard, in 1131, and it took place at a synod in Rheims. There, Pope Innocent II, in the presence of Bernard and Norbert of Xanten, officially made Gotthard a saint.

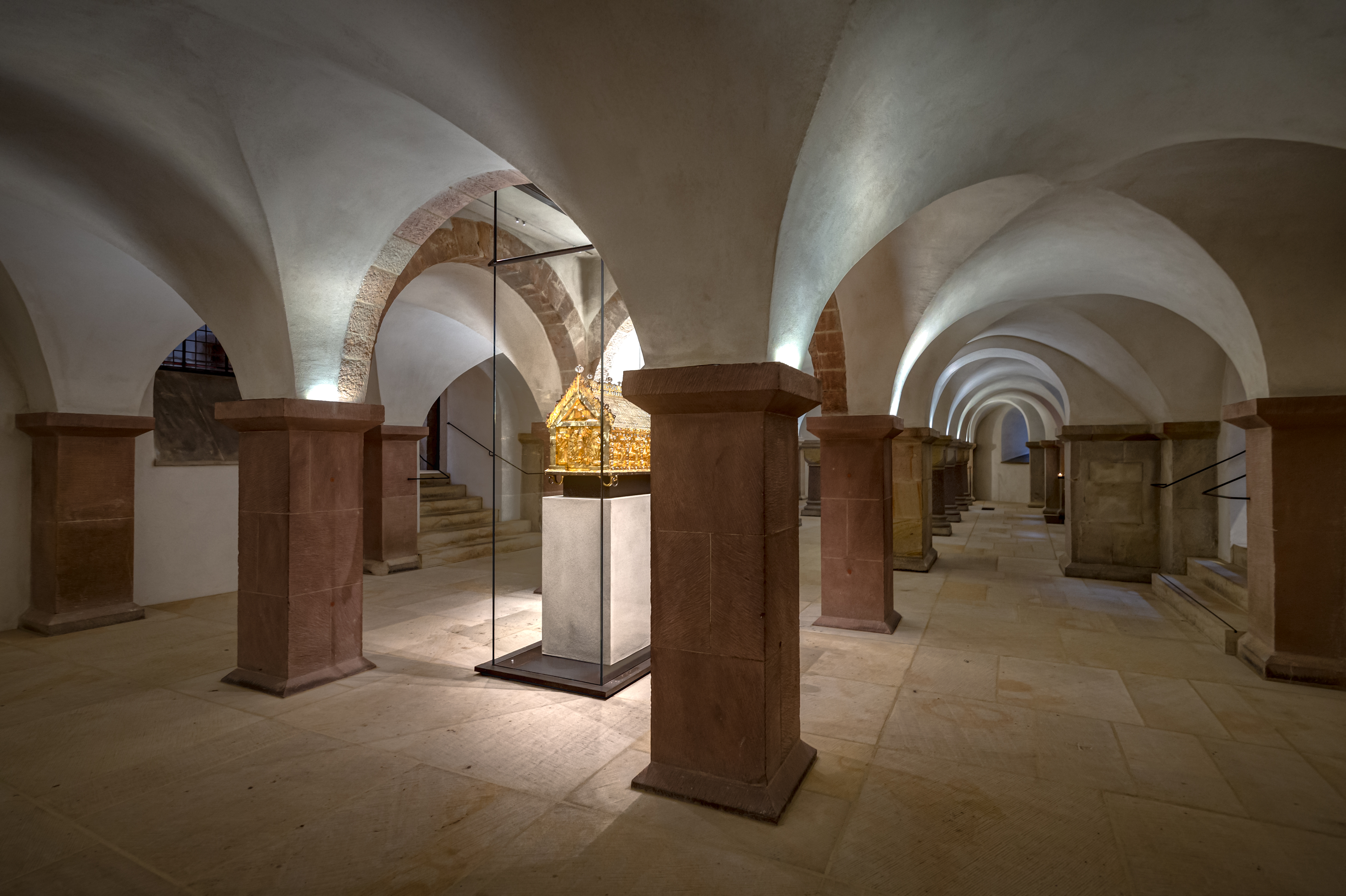
Shrine of Godehard in the crypt of Hildesheim Cathedral

On 4 May 1132, Bernard translated Gotthard's relics from the abbatial church to the cathedral at Hildesheim. On 5 May the first liturgical festivity in honor of Gotthard was celebrated. Miracles were attributed to the relics. The Gotthard shrine is one of the oldest remaining relic shrines of the Middle Ages, dating from about 1140.

Veneration of Gotthard spread to Scandinavia, Switzerland, and Eastern Europe. Gotthard was invoked against fever, dropsy, childhood sicknesses, hailstones, the pain of childbirth, and gout.

Niederaltaich Abbey made its famous abbot the patron saint of the abbey's well-known grammar school, the St.-Gotthard-Gymnasium.

Gotthard also became the patron saint of traveling merchants, and thus many churches and chapels were dedicated to him in the Alps.

According to an ancient Ticinese tradition, the little church in St. Gotthard Pass (San Gottardo) in the Swiss Alps was founded by Galdino, Archbishop of Milan (r. 1166-76). Goffredo da Bussero, however, attributes the founding of the church to Enrico da Settala, Bishop of Milan from 1213 to 1230. The hospice was entrusted to the care of the Capuchin Order in 1685 by Federico Visconti, and later passed under the control of a confraternity of Ticino.

== See also ==
- List of Catholic saints

== Named after ==
Several places and events are named in honour of the Saint:

- Gothard is a popular surname.
- St Gotthard Pass historically links the canton of Ticino with the German speaking part of Switzerland
- Szentgotthárd Abbey in Hungary
- Szentgotthárd, a Town in Hungary
- Battle of Saint Gotthard (1664) - part of the Austro-Turkish war
- Battle of Saint Gotthard (1705) - part of Rákóczi's anti-Habsburg rebellion

Godehard of Hildesheim Born: 960 Died: 5 May 1038
Catholic Church titles
Regnal titles
Preceded by Bernward	Bishop of Hildesheim; 1022–1038	Succeeded by Thiethmar
