= St. Godehard, Hildesheim =

St. Godehard
- Basilika St. Godehard
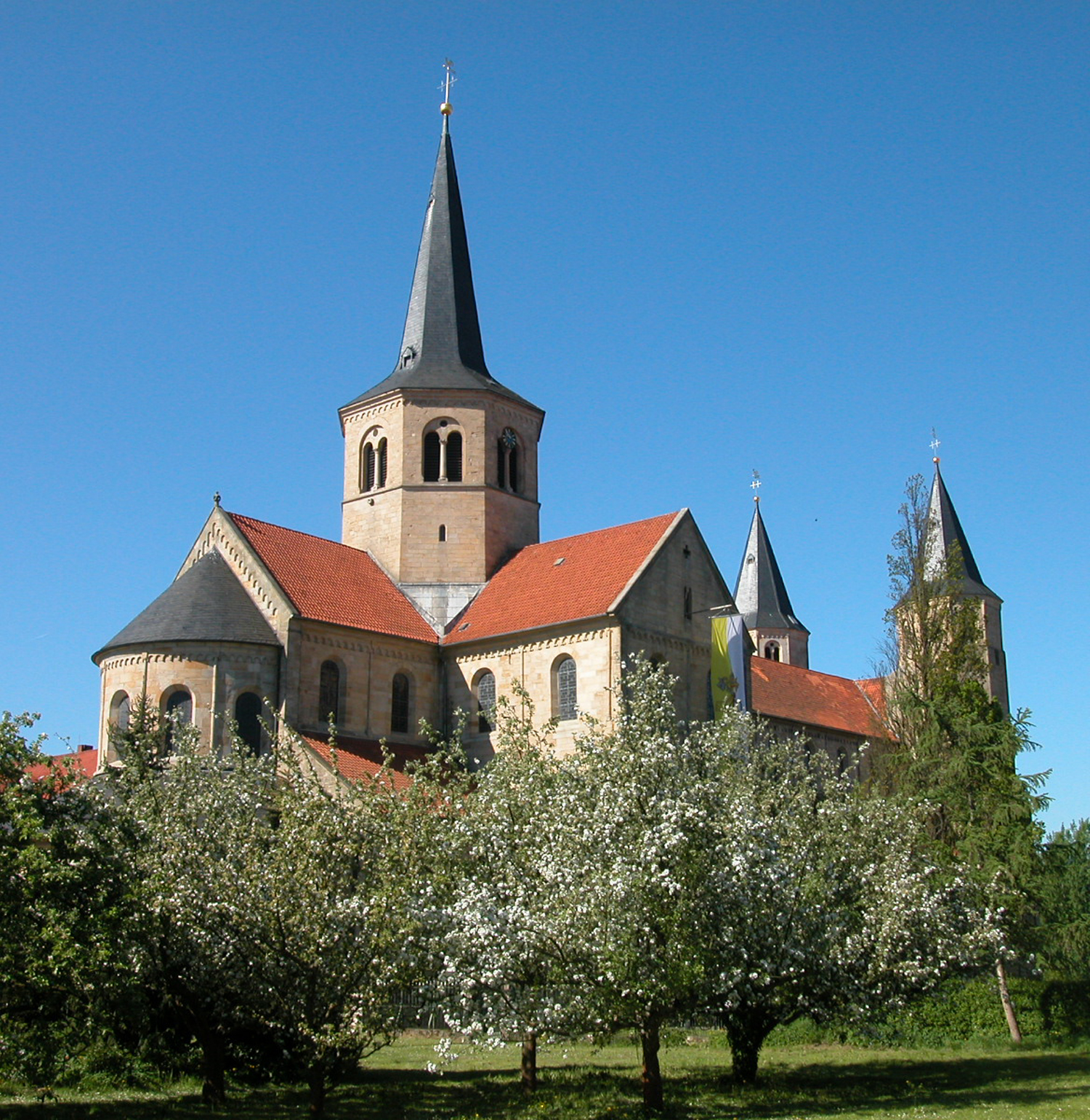
- St. Godehard
- 52°8′43″N 9°57′1″E
- Denomination: Catholic
- Website: www.st-godehard-hildesheim.de

History
- Dedication: St. Godehard
- Consecrated: 1172

Architecture
- Functional status: Minor Basilica
- Architectural type: basilica with 2 apses
- Style: Romanesque

Administration
- Diocese: Diocese of Hildesheim

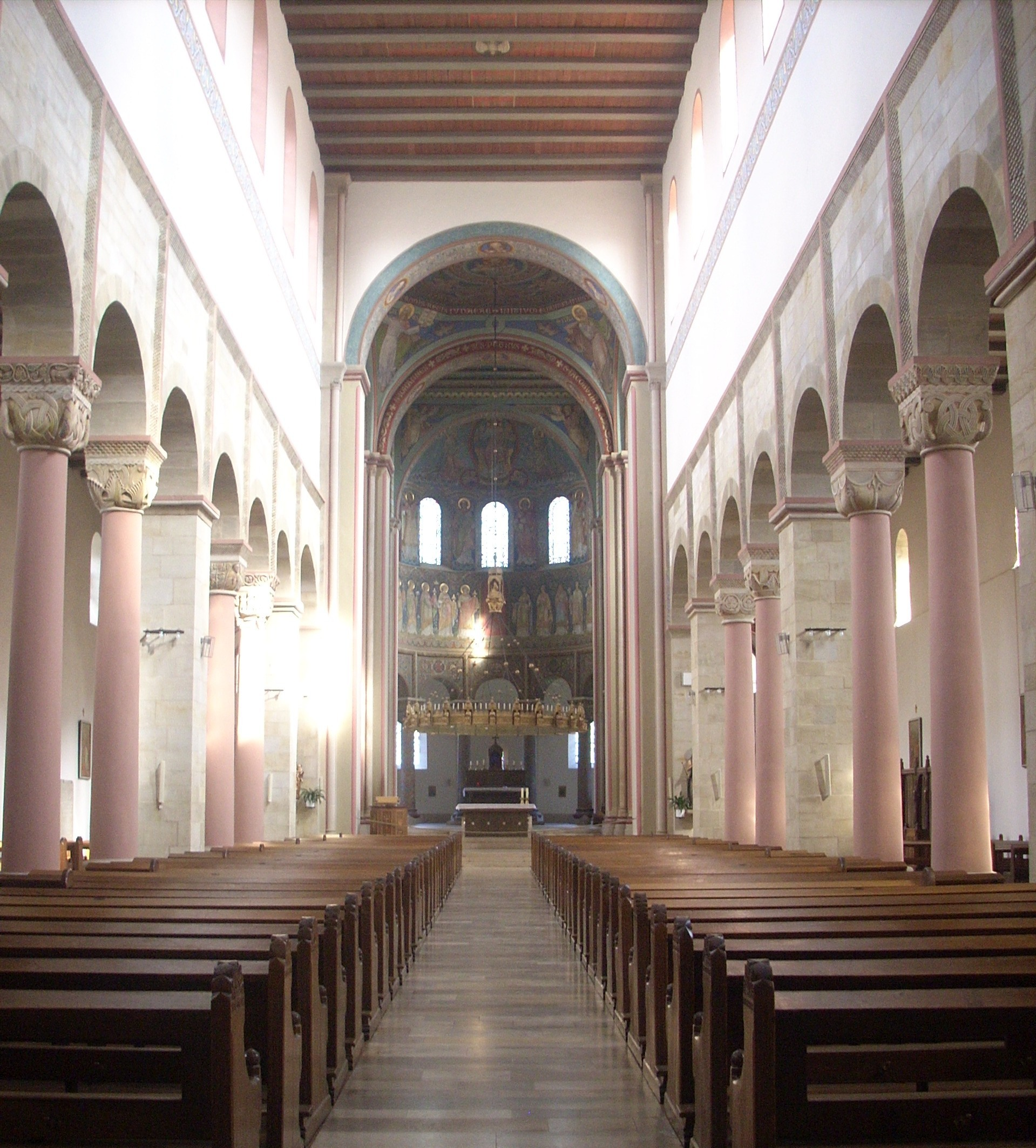
Interior

St. Godehard is a church in Hildesheim, Germany, formerly the church of a Benedictine abbey. It remained almost unaltered through the centuries and was not damaged much in World War II. It is one of the most important examples of Romanesque architecture in Germany.

It is a church of the Catholic parish Heilig Kreuz. The basilica has served as the "cathedral" of the bishop of Hildesheim from 1945 to 1960, when the Hildesheim Cathedral was destroyed and rebuilt, and from 2010, when restoration of the cathedral began. The Hezilo chandelier was installed in St. Godehard during the restoration time.

== History ==
Godehard of Hildesheim, a Benedictine and an influential bishop of Hildesheim from 1022 to 1038, was canonized in 1133. The same year, Bishop Bernard of Hildesheim founded the monastery and church in his honour. The church was completed in 1172 and consecrated by Bischof Adelog to St. Mary and St. Godehard.

In 1963, it was awarded the title of a Basilica minor by Pope Paul VI.

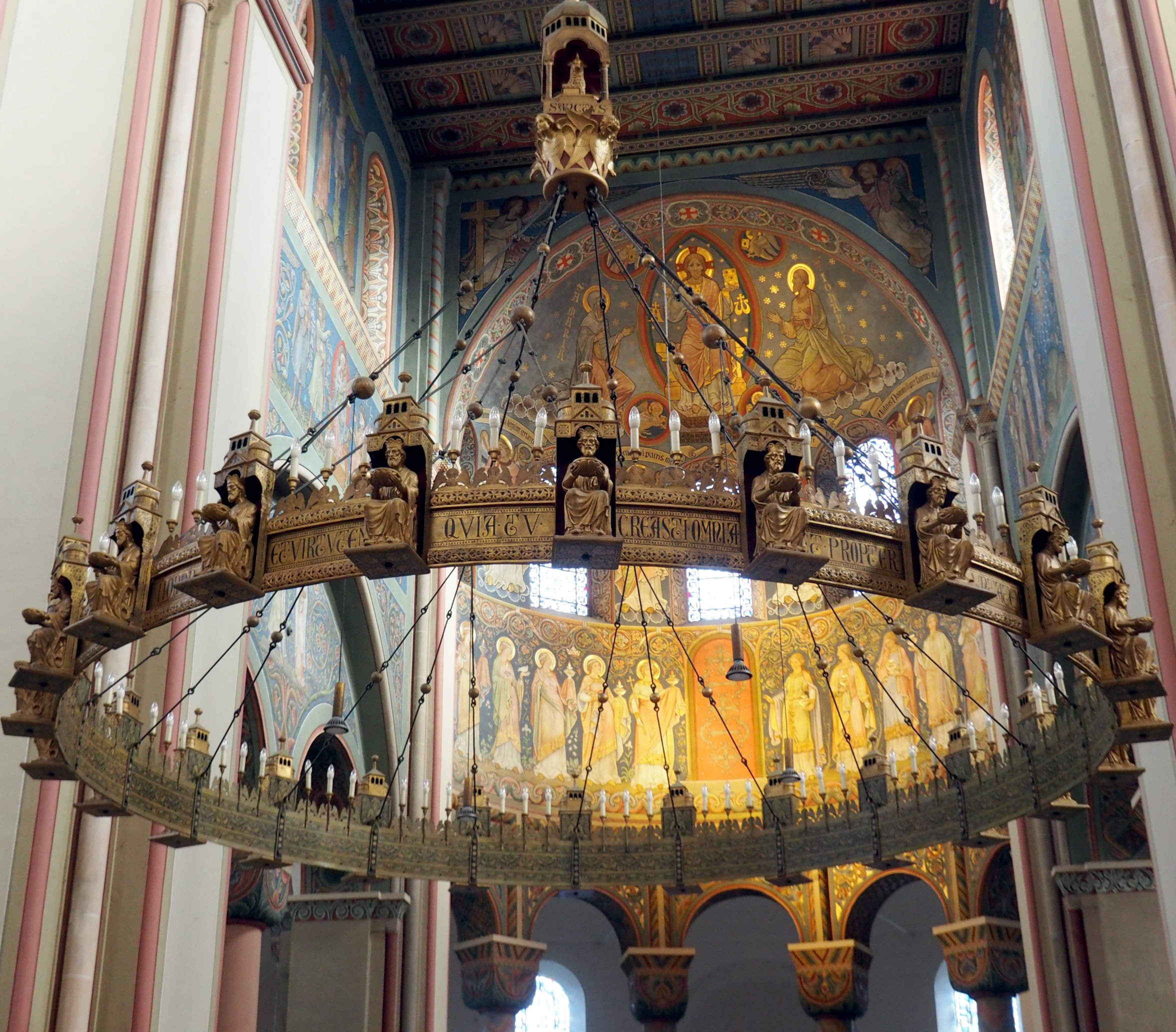
The church's own chandelier, donated in 1864 by Queen Marie

The former convent buildings are used for the Fachhochschule für Verwaltung und Rechtspflege (University of Applied Sciences for administration and law).
