= Tiki torch =

Pole-mounted torch

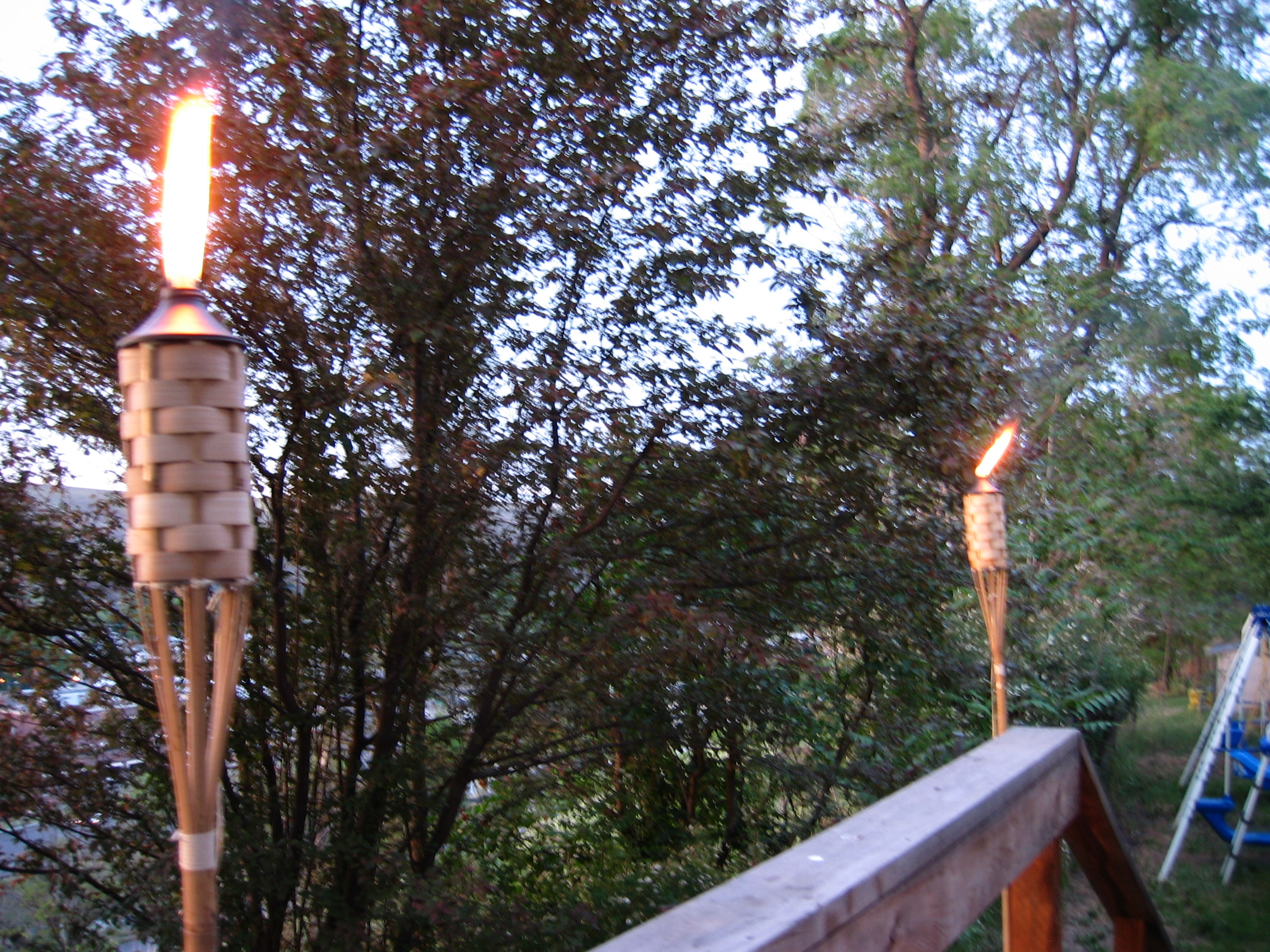
Lit tiki torches

A tiki torch is a pole-mounted torch, typically made of bamboo, that originated in the tiki culture of mid-20th-century United States, which has increased in popularity and spread elsewhere as a popular party decoration with a tropical island aesthetic. Though early mass-produced torches were made of aluminum or other metal, the most familiar style of tiki torch consists of a bamboo stick with a container of flammable fluid at the top from which the lit wick draws.

== History ==
Native Hawaiians traditionally created torches called lamalama out of bamboo, leaves of the Ti plant, and Kukui nuts as a fuel source. When lit, the nuts release Kukui nut oil that drips down and ignites them individually, creating a slow burning flame. Lamalama were used through the Hawaiian Islands for fishing along shallow reefs, as nighttime illumination, and as a tool to induce disorientation in fish. While this practice had been in decline when documented in the early 1900s, American use of tiki torches may have been inspired by the use of lamalama, and Native Hawaiian cultural practitioners continue to display them.

Tiki culture originated in the 1930s in California at Polynesian-themed bars and restaurants like Don's Beachcomber in Los Angeles, which featured flaming torches fueled by propane gas in its decor. Torches, both gas and electric, became a hallmark of the "tiki bars" that opened across the country in the following decades, and the tiki culture that grew out of them.

In the 1950s, a company in Wisconsin began producing aluminum torches for consumer use, obtaining a trademark for the "Tiki Torch" name. Tiki Brand, owned by W. C. Bradley Co. subsidiary Lamplight Farms, continues to produce its namesake torches, though other companies produce similar products also colloquially referred to as "tiki torches."

Popular materials used in manufacturing modern tiki torches include bamboo and metal. While tiki torches are usually intended as temporary fixtures, some are designed for permanent installation and may be connected to gas pipes for fuel. Citronella oil is used in some tiki torches to serve both as fuel for the flame and as insect repellent.

== Horticultural use ==
The name "tiki torch" has been borrowed as a nickname for Canna compacta.

== See also ==
- Outdoor lighting
- Polynesian culture
- Outdoor candle
