= Outdoor candle =

Large candle commonly found in Scandinavia

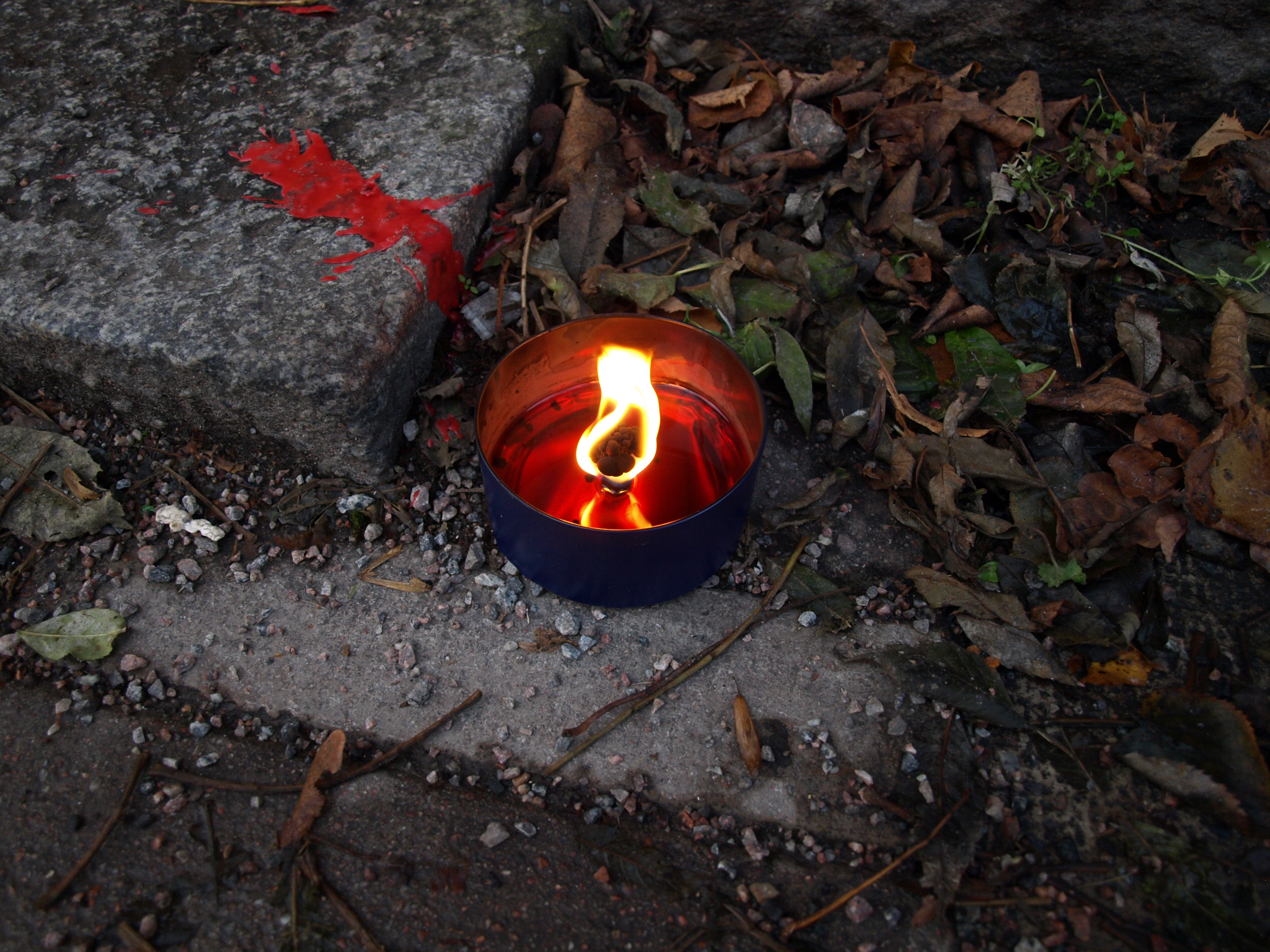
A lit outdoor candle

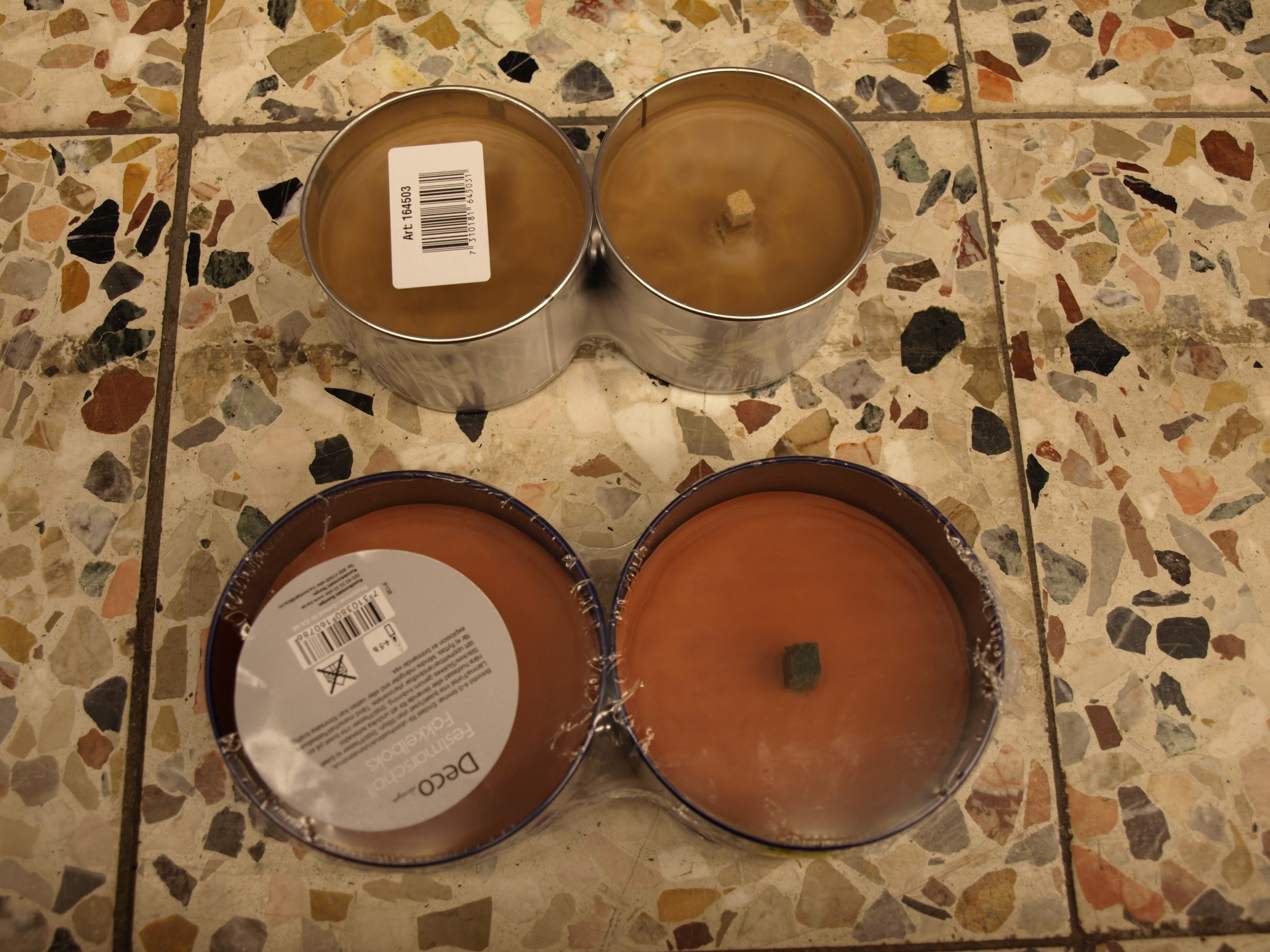
Two types of unopened packaged outdoor candle

An outdoor candle, which is also known a pitch torch or a garden candle (Swedish: marschall, Danish: haveblus, Finnish: soihtukynttilä) is candle similar to a tealight except that it is larger (usually 10 cm (4 in) wide) and lit outside. Outdoor candles are commonly found in Scandinavia, and are used as an outdoor decoration in private gardens, graves or on the side of roads or paths. They are made from paraffin in a metal cup with a one cm (0.39 in)-thick wick, which heats up to 1,000 °C (1,830 °F). Due to this heat, and the fact that they are designed to be weatherproof, they have to be properly snuffed out with a snuffer.

== See also ==
- Tiki torch - another type of outdoor candle
