= W. C. Bradley =

American businessman and philanthropist

William Clark Bradley (June 28, 1863 – July 26, 1947) was an American entrepreneur, businessman, and philanthropist. He, along with partner G. Gunby Jordan, co-founded two banks that eventually merged to become the present-day Synovus Financial Corp. He also formed the W. C. Bradley Co. in 1885 by purchasing a cotton factoring firm and immediately expanding it into a diverse business spanning many different industries. Bradley also played a prominent role in the early history of The Coca-Cola Company, serving as its chairman of the board from 1919 to 1939.

== Early life ==
Bradley was born in Russell County, Alabama, on June 28, 1863.

== Career ==
In 1885, he moved to nearby Columbus, Georgia, and began work as a clerk at the cotton factoring firm Bussey-Goldsmith and Company. He soon purchased the firm from its owners with the help of his brother-in-law, Samuel A. Carter. They changed the name of the company to Carter and Bradley and immediately began to diversify its line of business into other areas including fertilizer sales and groceries.

=== Banking interests ===
Three years after his move to Columbus, Bradley teamed with local businessman G. Gunby Jordan to form the Third National Bank of Columbus and the Columbus Savings Bank. As president of both banks, Bradley led their merger in 1930 to form Columbus Bank and Trust, lead bank and predecessor company of the present-day Synovus, a regional bank located across five southeastern states.

=== W. C. Bradley Co. ===

In 1895, Bradley purchased his brother-in-law's share of Carter and Bradley and renamed the business W. C. Bradley Co. The W. C. Bradley Co. flourished over the next century, expanding into industries as diverse as textiles, outdoor and sports retail businesses, real estate, and barbecue grill manufacturing. The company invented a standalone barbecue grill from its foundry capabilities and then founded Char-Broil in 1948 as the first significant manufacturer of charcoal grills for homeowners.

As of 2005, the company, still privately held, earned approximately $450 million in revenue and had an employee base of 2,500.

=== The Coca-Cola Company ===
In 1919, a group of investors headed by Ernest Woodruff and W. C. Bradley purchased The Coca-Cola Company for $25 million. The business was reincorporated as a Delaware corporation, and 500,000 shares of its common stock were sold publicly for $40 per share.
