= Tea cosy =

Cover for a teapot, traditionally made of cloth

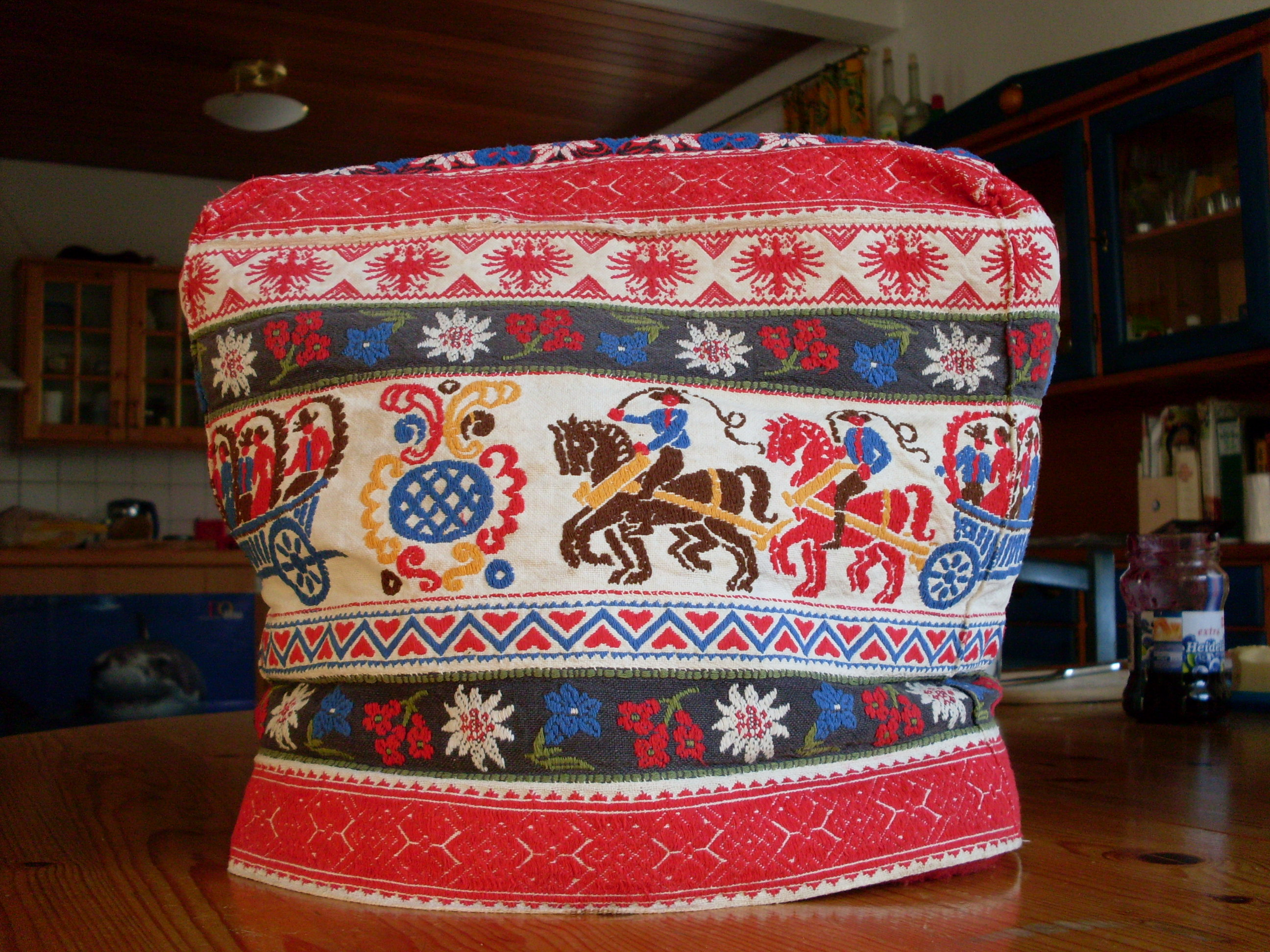
A traditional German tea cosy made of quilted fabric with folk art patterns

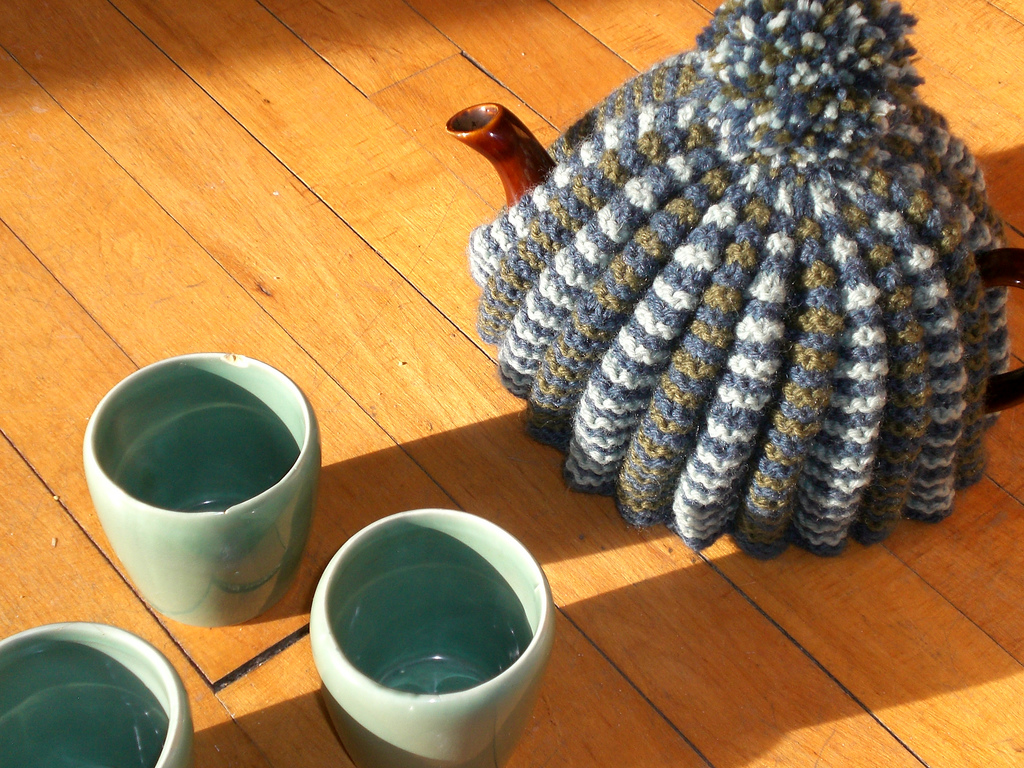
A textured, hand knitted tea cosy of the "bachelor" variety on a teapot

A tea cosy or tea warmer is a cover for a teapot, traditionally made of cloth. It insulates a teapot, keeping the contents warm, with its properties based on low thermal conductivity of the air trapped underneath and inside the cosy. In this respect the cosy is similar to a thermos flask that had become popular in the beginning of the 20th century.

Sometimes, if the tea is served in a restaurant or in a hotel, the teapot is covered with a tea cosy that has a metal exterior to protect the inner fabric of the cosy from wear and tear and also to further improve the insulation of the teapot. A typical cosy is easy to put over or pop off the teapot in order to pour the tea, but some are wrapped around the teapot and have holes for the spout and the handle (so called "bachelor" teapots). The "crinoline lady" cosies include a porcelain doll on the top, with her flowing skirts providing the thermal insulation.

Tea cosies may have padded inserts that can be removed and washed. Some tea cosies are hand-knitted, resembling woollen hats, some even feature a "bobble" (pom-pom) on top, which may also serve as a handle to remove or lift the tea cosy. A special tea cosy is the so-called tea lugger, which enables the hot teapot to be carried around easily.

Tea cosies may sometimes be made in matching sets with items such as tablecloths, place mats, egg cosies, oven gloves, or aprons. Cloth tea-cosies may be embroidered, perhaps to complement a fine set of china. Some have been made with hidden pockets to be filled with fragrant herbs or flowers, similar to a potpourri.

== History ==
Although the history of the tea cosy may have begun when tea was introduced from China to Britain in the 1660s (Pettigrew suggests the origins in the 18th century), the first documented use of a tea cosy in Britain was in 1867. It is probably the Duchess of Bedford who, by establishing the activity of afternoon tea in 1840, would have brought the popularity of the tea cosy. During the Victorian era tea time was important for social interaction, and the absence of central heating made drinks cool down fast, so the use of an insulation jacket for the teapot made sense.

Tea cosies started to be used in North America in the same period. Newspapers of the time reveal that tea cosies enjoyed "a sudden and unexpected rise in public favor" among women who hosted tea parties. Newspapers of the time included advice columns on how to make one: "Some very handsome ones are made of remnants of heavy brocade, but linen is generally used, embroidered or not, according to taste, as these covers are washable. Make the covering large enough for your teapot and provide a ring at the top to lift it off with."

Tea cosies then flourished during the late 19th century, where they appeared in many households across Britain, motivated by the obsession of decorating and covering objects characteristic of the Victorian era. The popularity continued into the 20th century, when cosy become an object of handicraft for both homemakers and craftsmen. The use of cosies dwindled by the end of the 20th century due to the reduced use of teapots (these are not required if the tea bags are used).

== Art and literature ==
Tea cosy needlework art is captured by a collection of the Norfolk Museums and Archeology Service on contemporary British artists and artisans.

Tea cosies in fiction include the eponymous item in Edward Gorey's The Haunted Tea-Cosy: A Dispirited and Distasteful Diversion for Christmas.

A well-known quote from Scottish comedian Billy Connolly is "Never trust a man who, when left alone in a room with a tea cosy, does not try it on."

Australian author Loani Prior's Wild Tea Cosies and Really Wild Tea Cosies made the Top Ten of the Australian National Bestseller List in 2008 and 2010 respectively. Loani's tea cosies have been exhibited at the Powerhouse Museum.

A biennial Australian celebration of tea cosies, in Fish Creek, Victoria, attracts thousands of visitors and hundreds of competition entries. The last Fish Creek Tea Cosy Festival was held in 2024.

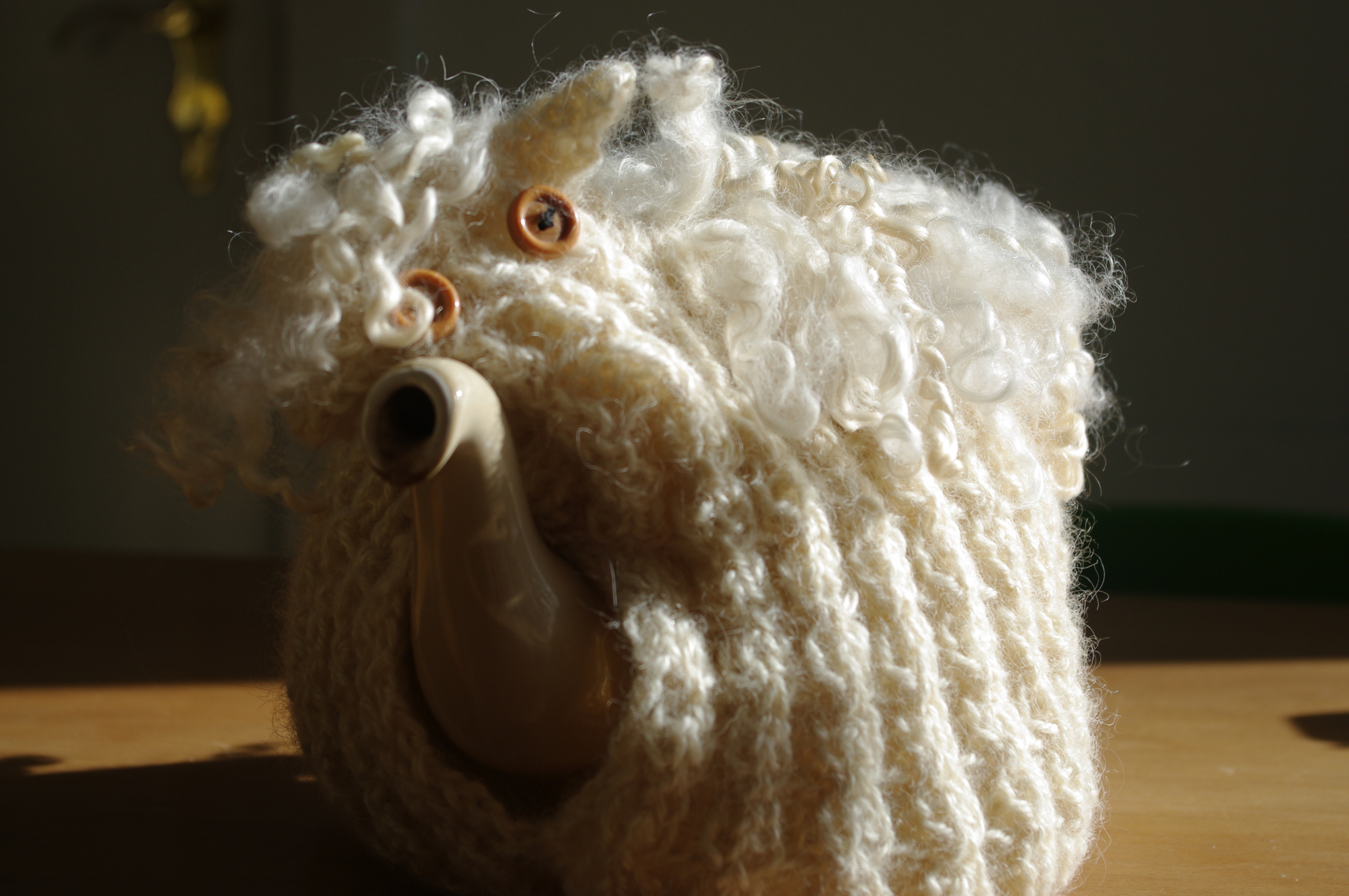
Teapot with knitted tea cosy sheep

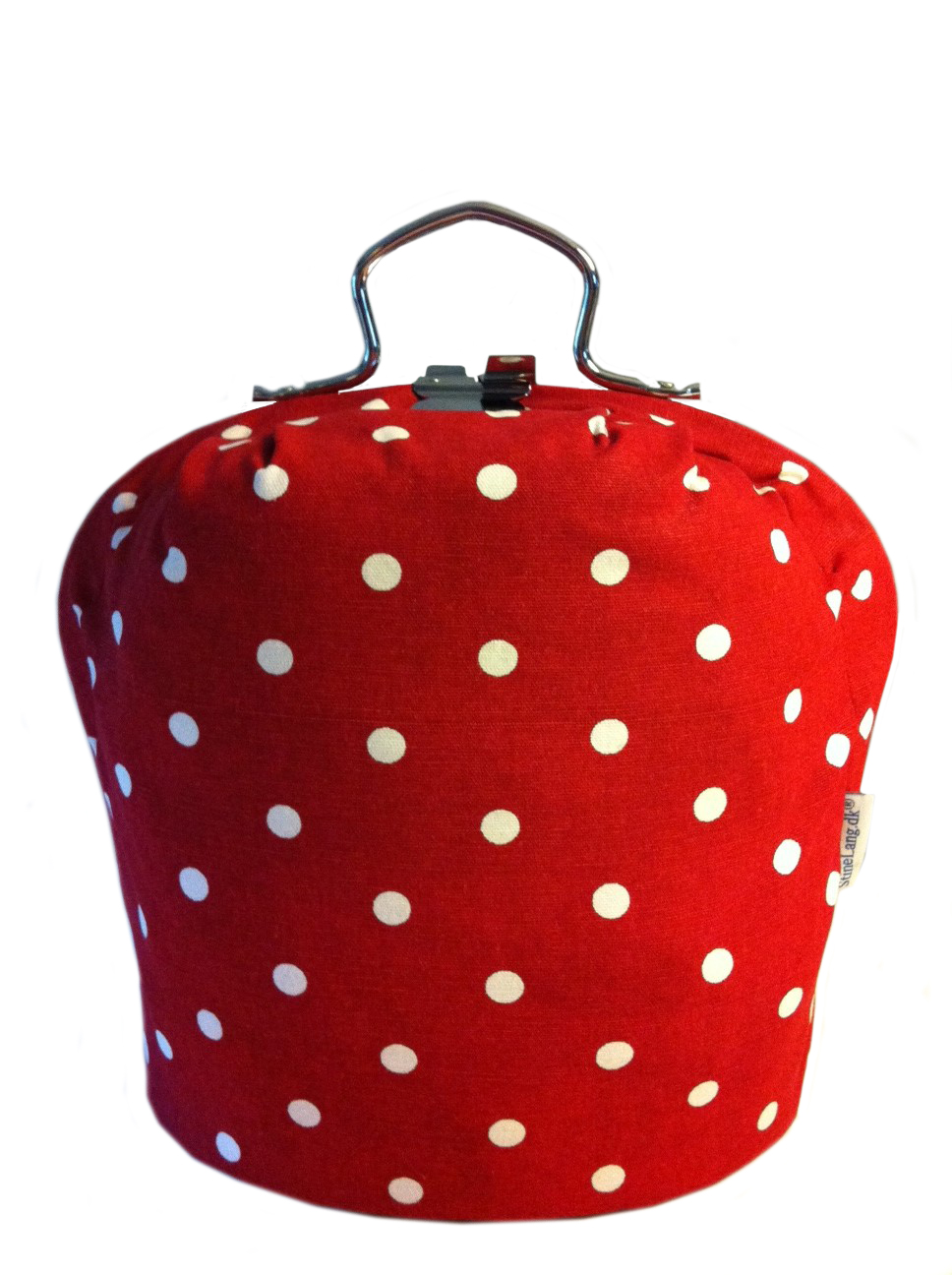
A tea lugger

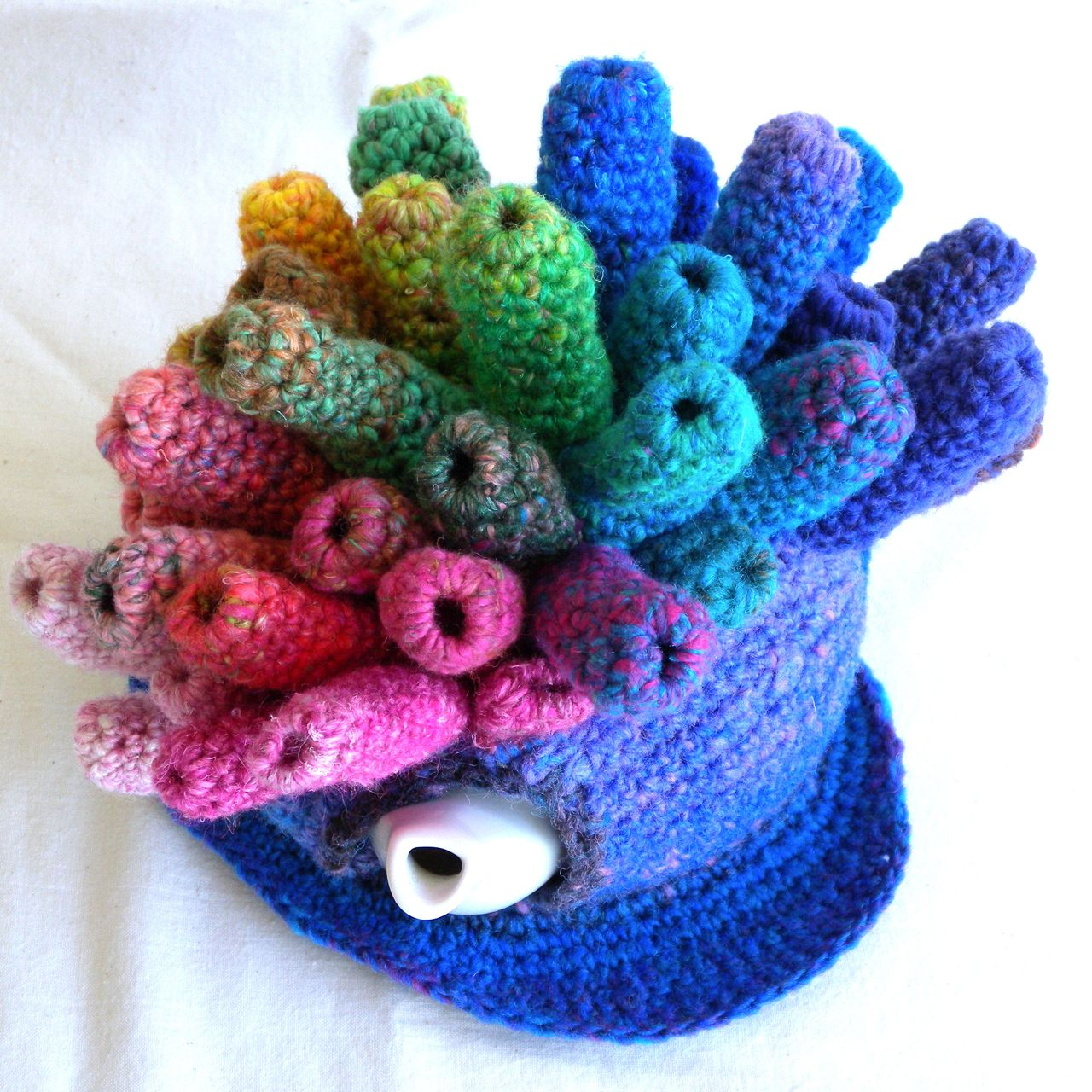
An elaborate Coral Tea Cosy, crocheted to suggest the appearance of a coral reef

Various tea cosies pictured on a knitting patterns magazine for home crafters, from the 1930s

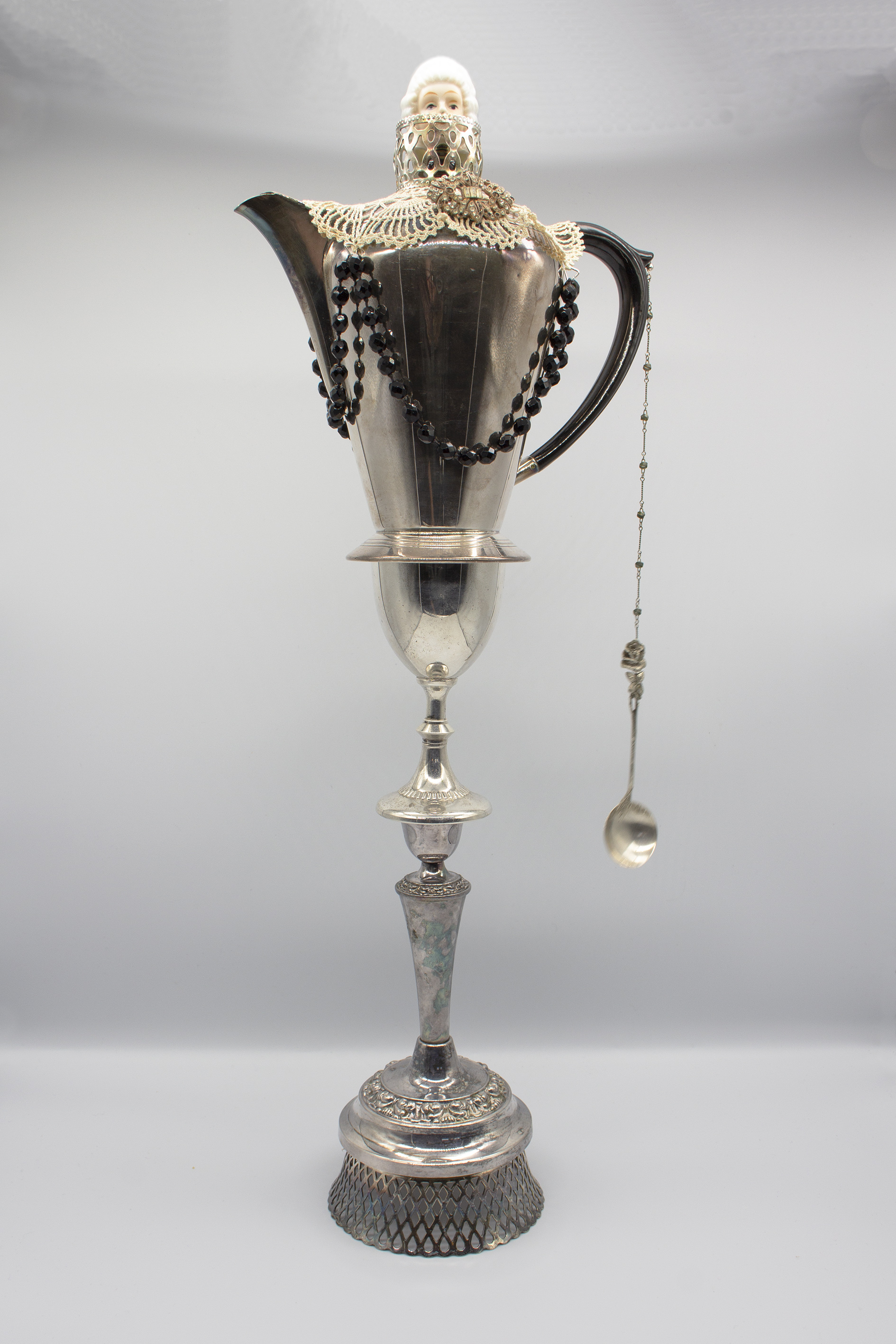
Example of non-functional tea cosy art: Lady Norrington Takes Tea by Lisa Hocking

== See also ==
- Koozie
- Tea culture
- Tealight, a small candle in a metal tin that can also be used to warm a teapot

== Sources ==
- O'Banion, N.; Chen, J.; McDevitt, E.; Flying Fish Press (1915). Domestic Science. Cambridge University Press.
- Pettigrew, Jane (2001). A Social History of Tea. National Trust. ISBN 978-0-7078-0289-3. OCLC 1008339683.
- Pettigrew, Jane (30 July 2004). "Tea Cosies". Afternoon Tea. Jarrold Publishing. p. 72. ISBN 978-1-84165-143-9. OCLC 1255754665.
