= Solid fuel =

Solid material that can be burnt to release energy

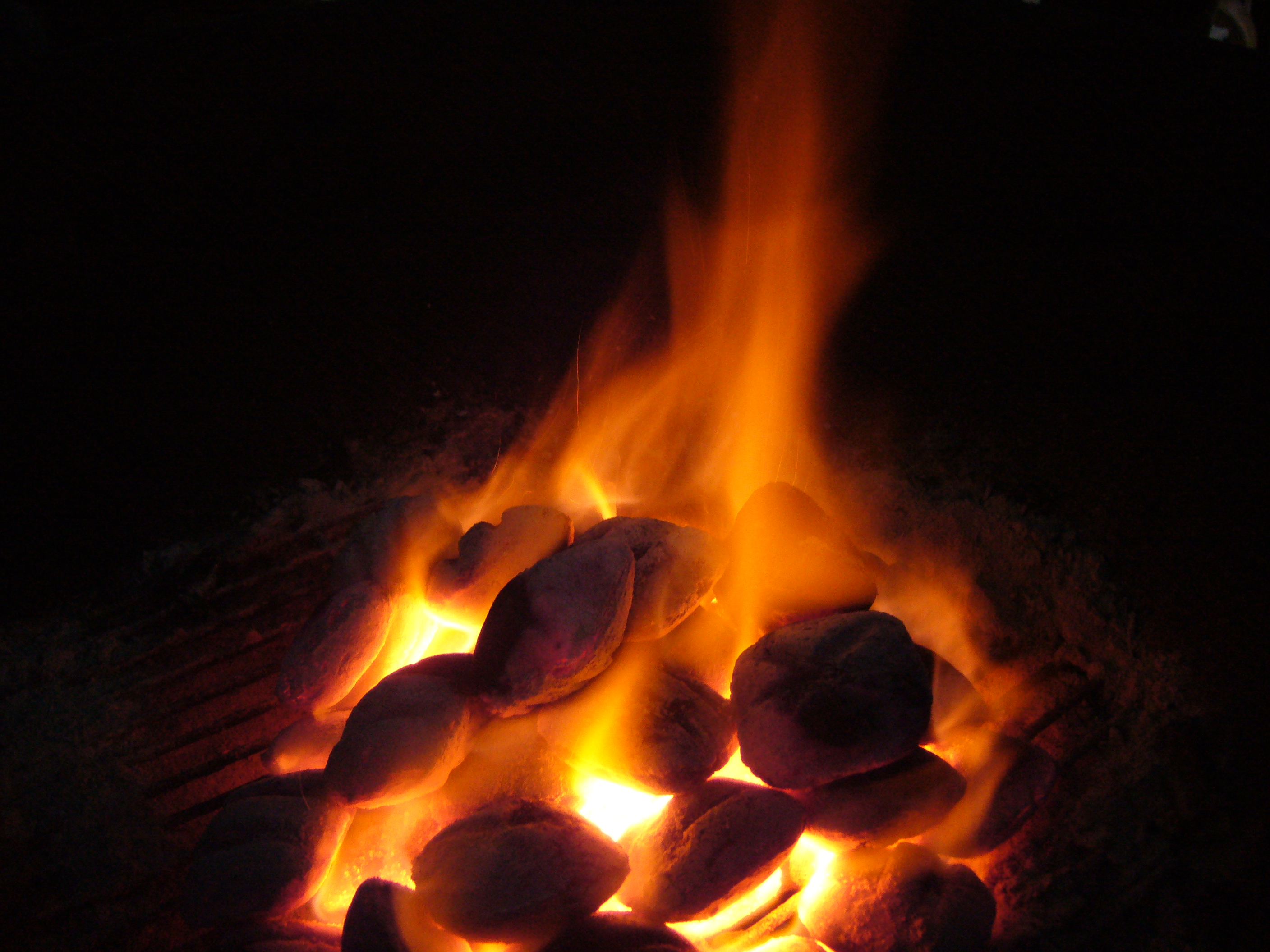
A fire made of charcoal briquettes

Solid fuel refers to various forms of solid material that can be burnt to release energy, providing heat and light through the process of combustion. Solid fuels can be contrasted with liquid fuels and gaseous fuels. Common examples of solid fuels include wood, charcoal, peat, coal, hexamine fuel tablets, dry dung, wood pellets, corn, wheat, rice, rye, and other grains. Solid fuels are extensively used in rocketry as solid propellants. Solid fuels have been used throughout human history to create fire and solid fuel is still in widespread use throughout the world in the present day.

Solid fuel from biomass is regarded as a renewable energy source which can contribute to climate change mitigation efforts. Solid fuel from fossil fuels (i.e. coal) is not a renewable energy.

== Types ==
=== Biomass ===
Biomass that is used for energy production can be processed into solid fuels but also into liquid or gaseous fuels. In comparison, the term biofuel is nowadays mainly (but not exclusively) used for liquid or gaseous fuels, used for transportation.

Pellet fuels are made from compressed organic matter or biomass. Pellets can be made from any one of five general categories of biomass: industrial waste and co-products, food waste, agricultural residues, energy crops, and untreated lumber. Wood pellets are the most common type of pellet fuel.

In the context of energy production, biomass is matter from recently living (but now dead) organisms which is used for bioenergy production. Examples include wood, wood residues, energy crops, agricultural residues including straw, and organic waste from industry and households. Wood and wood residues is the largest biomass energy source today. Wood can be used as a fuel directly or processed into pellet fuel or other forms of fuels. Other plants can also be used as fuel, for instance maize, switchgrass, miscanthus and bamboo. The main waste feedstocks are wood waste, agricultural waste, municipal solid waste, and manufacturing waste. Upgrading raw biomass to higher grade fuels can be achieved by different methods, broadly classified as thermal, chemical, or biochemical.

==== Wood ====
Wood fuel can refer to several fuels such as firewood, charcoal, wood chips sheets, pellets, and sawdust. The particular form used depends upon factors such as source, quantity, quality and application. In many areas, wood is the most easily available form of fuel, requiring no tools in the case of picking up dead wood, or few tools. Today, burning of wood is the largest use of energy derived from a solid fuel biomass. Wood fuel can be used for cooking and heating, and occasionally for fueling steam engines and steam turbines that generate electricity. Wood may be used indoors in a furnace, stove, or fireplace, or outdoors in a furnace, campfire, or bonfire. As with any fire, burning wood fuel creates numerous by-products, some of which may be useful (heat and steam), and others that are undesirable, irritating or dangerous.

When harvested in a sustainable fashion wood is usually considered to be a renewable solid fuel (renewable energy).

There is debate as to whether burning wood can be considered carbon neutral, as technically the wood cannot release more carbon than was sequestered during its growth, although this does not take account of other impacts such as deforestation and rotting has on the carbon footprint.

==== Peat ====
Peat fuel is an accumulation of partially decayed vegetation or organic matter that can be burnt once sufficiently dried. It is used widely in the country districts of Ireland and Scotland where alternatives are absent or expensive. It has a relatively low calorific value, even after essential drying.

=== Fossil fuels ===
==== Coal ====
Coal is a combustible black or brownish-black sedimentary rock usually occurring in rock strata in layers or veins called coal beds or coal seams. Throughout history, coal has been used as an energy resource, primarily burned for the production of electricity and heat, and is also used for industrial purposes, such as refining metals. Coal is the largest source of energy for the generation of electricity worldwide, as well as one of the largest worldwide The extraction of coal, its use in energy production and its byproducts are all associated with environmental and health effects. Variations such as smokeless coal can be formed naturally in the form of anthracite, a metamorphosed type of coal with a very high carbon content that gives off a smokeless flame when set alight. It is an important type of smokeless fuel.

==== Coke ====
Coke is a fuel with few impurities and a high carbon content, usually made from coal. It is the solid carbonaceous material derived from destructive distillation of low-ash, low-sulfur bituminous coal. Cokes made from coal are grey, hard, and porous. While coke can be formed naturally, the commonly used form is man-made. The form known as petroleum coke, or pet coke, is derived from oil refinery coker units or other cracking processes.

==== Smokeless fuel ====
Solid fuels which produce little smoke or volatiles are made from powdered anthracite coal and supplied in the form of briquettes usually for domestic use either in stoves or open fireplaces. The fuel is replacing coal as a fuel for open fires because of the reduction in particulate emissions and its increased efficiency. Smokeless fuel burns at a higher temperature and more slowly than a coal fire. The term also includes charcoal, made by restricted combustion of dry wood and widely used at open air barbecues to cook food on an open fire.

=== Solid fuels for special applications ===
==== Rocket propellant ====
Solid rocket propellant consists of a solid oxidizer (such as ammonium nitrate) bound with flakes or powders of energy compounds (such as RDX) plus binders, plasticizers, stabilizers, and other additives. Solid propellant is much easier to store and handle than liquid propellant, and has a higher energy density so requires less space for the same amount of stored energy.

== Calorific value ==
The heat available from each type of fuel is variable, and depends on the carbon and hydrogen content, as well as non-combustible or ash and water content. One measure of the heat produced by burning is the heat of combustion, an exact measure usually determined using bomb calorimetry and demanding complete combustion to carbon dioxide and water.

Gaseous fuels like methane have higher values than solid fuels like coal. Peat exhibits the lowest value of all common fuels. Thus methane has an HHV (Higher heating value) of 55.50 MJ/kg, the highest value of common fuels.

Diesel fuel has an HHV value of 44.80 MJ/kg and anthracite coal a value of 32.50 MJ/kg. Moisture and ash-free firewood has a lower value of 21.70 MJ/kg while dry peat has the lowest value of all common fuels of about 15.00 MJ/kg.

These are somewhat ideal values and the actual heat realized by any fuel will depend on the fireplace or combustion chamber used and its design for example. However they do give a useful guide to the heat available from any fuel. Dry wood has roughly two thirds the calorific value of coal so a greater weight is needed to make the same amount of heat.

== Cost and transport ==
Solid fuels, compared to liquid fuels or gaseous fuels, are often cheaper, easier to extract, more stable to transport and in many places are more readily available.

Coal, in particular, is utilized in the generation of 38% of the world's electricity because it is less expensive than its liquid and gas counterparts.

== Damage to health and the environment ==
Solid fuels require more destructive methods to extract/burn and often have higher carbon, nitrate and sulphate emissions. With the exception of sustainable wood/biomass, solid fuel is normally considered non-renewable as it requires thousands of years to form.

Solid fuels are composed of organic materials and can contribute to poor air quality. The burning of solid fuels releases more organic aerosol than liquefied petroleum gas and releases many volatile organic compounds, which can contribute to poor air quality through the formation of secondary pollutants such as ground level ozone and secondary organic aerosol. The emissions from solid fuels are major drivers of poor air quality in regions where solid fuels are a dominant fuel source.

In the United Kingdom, the "Heating Equipment Testing and Approvals Scheme" operated by HETAS Ltd. provides an approval and certification service for solid fuel heating appliances, fuels, services, and registered installers, to ensure that they operate safely.

== See also ==
- Biomass briquettes
- Fossil fuel
- Hindenburg light
- Nuclear power
- Synthetic fuel
