= W. C. Bradley Co. =

American manufacturer

- Type: Private
- Industry: Leisure, Lifestyle, Real Estate,
- Founded: 1885; 141 years ago in Columbus, Georgia, USA
- Founder: W. C. Bradley
- Headquarters: Columbus, Georgia, USA
- Key people: John T. Turner, Chairman; James G. Hillenbrand, President & CEO
- Subsidiaries: Char-Broil, LLC; Lamplight Farms Incorporated; W. C. Bradley Real Estate, LLC; Badlands
- Website: wcbradley.com

The W. C. Bradley Company is an American manufacturer of consumer goods. It comprises four companies based on home and leisure products and services: Char-Broil, Lamplight, and W. C. Bradley Co. Real Estate.

== History ==
The W. C. Bradley Co., founded in 1885, is a privately owned company headquartered in Columbus, Georgia. Founded as a "cotton factoring" business, the company heritage includes operating diverse businesses in the textiles industry, farm implement manufacturing, row crop and livestock production, wholesale supply businesses meeting the needs of industrial and building contractors, retail businesses in outdoor sports equipment and licensed sports apparel, and barbecue grill manufacturing.

The W. C. Bradley Co.’s headquarters are located on the Chattahoochee River, in uptown Columbus, Georgia. The building which became the headquarters was previously used as a cotton warehouse. Throughout its history, the company transitioned through various businesses and industries. In the early 1900s, W. C. Bradley joined Ernest Woodruff and other investors in purchasing the Coca-Cola Company in Atlanta, Georgia. As of 2022, the W. C. Bradley Co. is a multi-brand supplier of consumer goods and services focused primarily on the home and leisure lifestyle markets.

== Subsidiaries and affiliates ==
=== Char-Broil ===
Based in Columbus, Georgia, Char-Broil is a manufacturer of charcoal, gas, and electric outdoor grills, smokers, fryers and related accessories sold throughout North America, Europe, Australia, Latin America, and the Middle East. In addition to the Char-Broil label, the company manages and manufactures a portfolio of outdoor cooking brands: Oklahoma Joe’s smokers, SABER grills, and Dancook grills. In 1998, Char-Broil acquired the Oklahoma Joe’s brand name with a product line of smokers and accessories. In 2011, Saber Grills, LLC, was formed as a stand-alone entity which introduced SABER grills, a line of grills sold through the independent outdoor retailer channel. Also in 2011, Char-Broil acquired Kriswell A/S, beginning Char-Broil’s expansion into the international market. This Danish grill and grilling accessories company markets products under the Dancook brand.

=== Badlands ===
Located at the base of the Wasatch Mountain Range in Sandy, Utah, Badlands manufactures hunting gear specializing in backpacks, apparel and hunting accessories. Founded in the early 1990s, the Badlands lineup grew from offering only backpacks for the first 20 years to now offering a full lineup of hunting apparel, lifestyle apparel, binocular cases, luggage, camping equipment and more. In 2015, Badlands released its first proprietary camouflage pattern, Badlands Approach. Today, all products are offered only in Badlands’ own camouflage patterns or solid colours.

=== Lamplight ===
Headquartered in Menomonee Falls, Wisconsin, Lamplight was acquired by the W. C. Bradley Co. in 1998. Beginning in 1964, Lamplight developed smokeless, odorless indoor lamp oils. Lamplight expanded its line of indoor oil lamps and oil by illuminating yards with its outdoor torches and citronella fuel. To further expand its business, Lamplight acquired TIKI Brand in 2001.

=== W. C. Bradley Co. Real Estate ===
W. C. Bradley Co. has been involved in real estate development in the Columbus, Georgia, area for over 50 years. Notable projects include the Synovus Centre building, Riverfront building, Starrett-Bytewise corporate offices, and Eagle & Phenix Mills – a multi-use development located on 13 acres along the river in Uptown Columbus. Additional riverfront developments include Whitewater Express and 11th & Bay restaurant. In 2017, the Real Estate group announced its newest venture – The Rapids at Riverfront Place — scheduled to open in 2019.
