= Tealight =

Type of candle

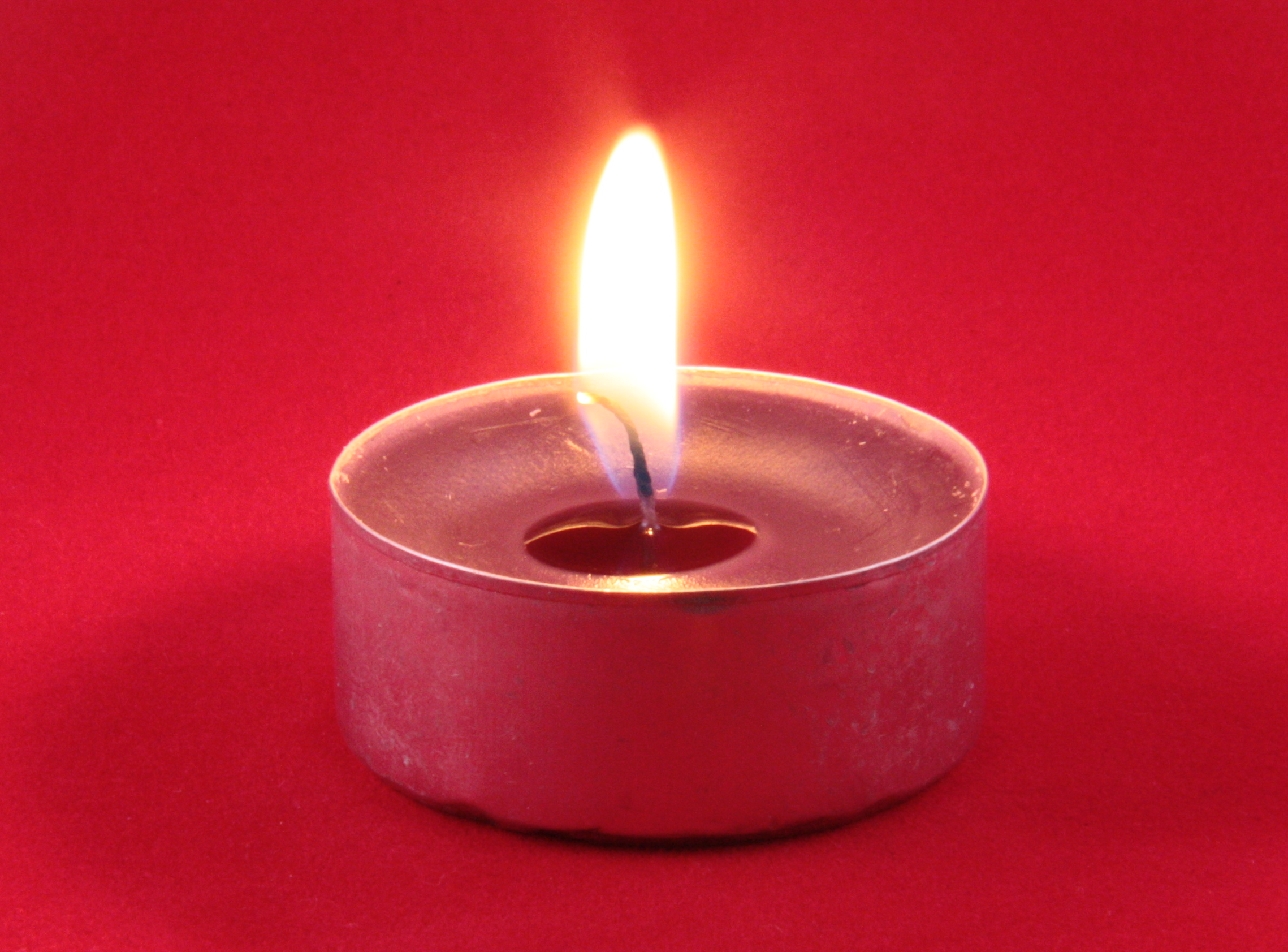
A tealight which has just been lit, with the wax beginning to liquify

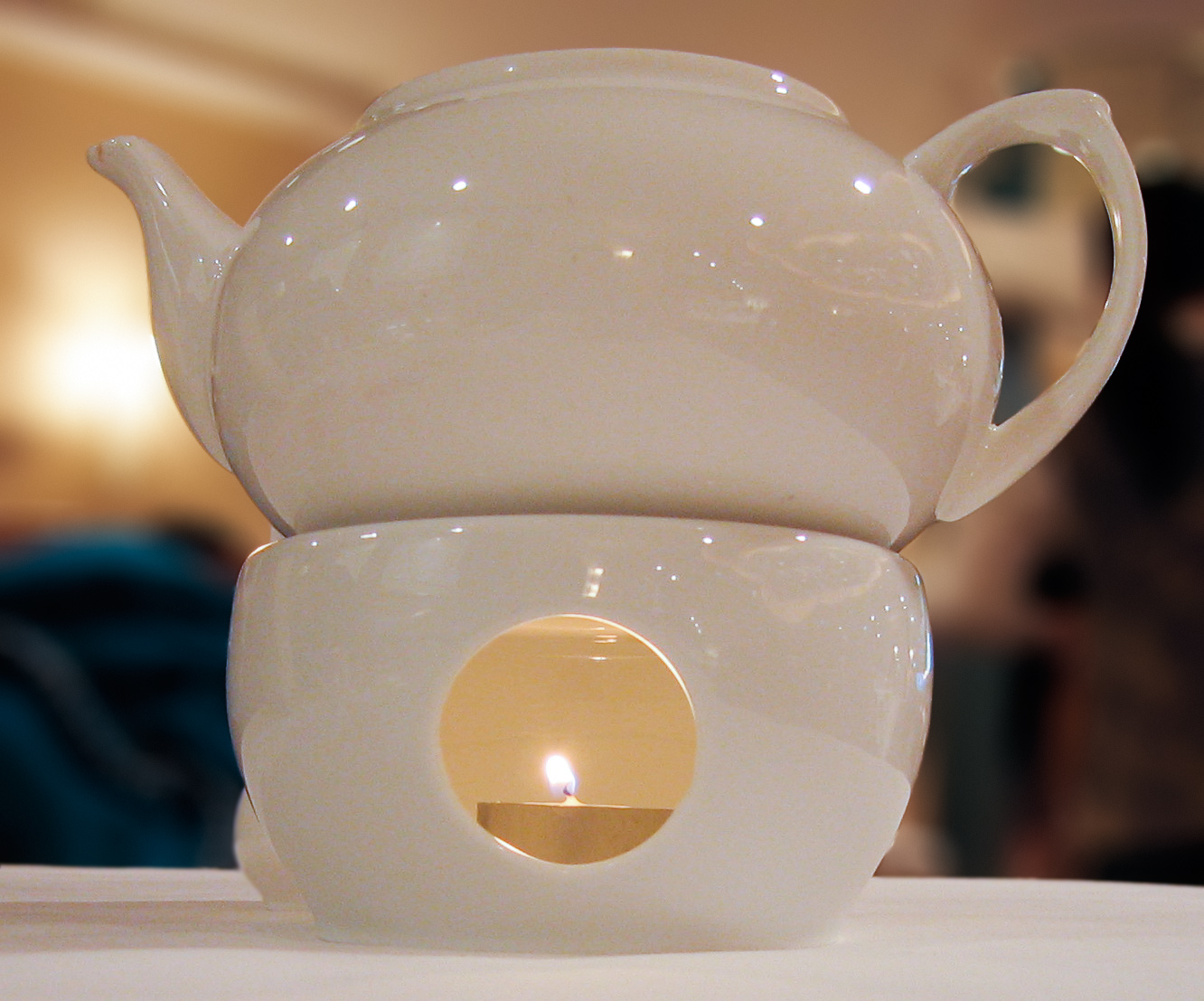
A tealight warming a teapot

A tealight (also tea-light, tea light, tea candle, or informally tea lite, t-lite or t-candle) is a candle contained in a thin metal or plastic cup so that its wax can melt completely while lit. They are typically small, circular, usually wider than their height, and inexpensive. Tealights derive their name from their use in teapot warmers, but are also used as food warmers in general, e.g. fondue.

Tealights are a popular choice for accent lighting and for heating scented oil. A benefit that they have over taper candles is that they do not drip. Tealights may be set afloat on water for decorative effect. Because of their small size and low level of light, multiple tealights are often burned simultaneously. Longer-burning tealights may be called nightlights. They are also lit for religious purposes.

== Varieties ==
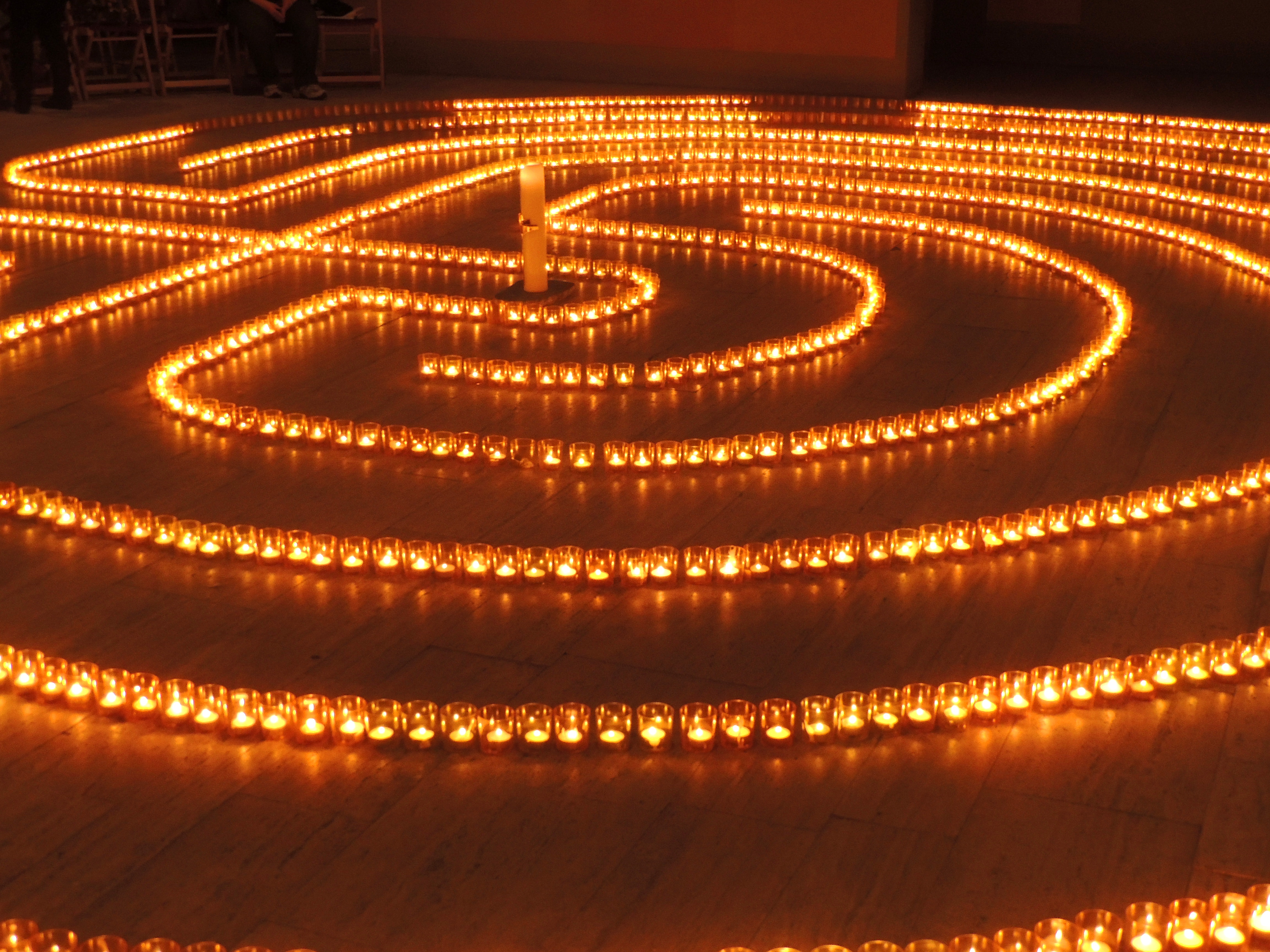
Advent labyrinth made with 2,500 burning tealights at the Holy Cross – Centre for Christian Meditation and Spirituality, Bornheim, Germany

Tealights can come in many different shapes and sizes, small and large, as well as burn times and scents. However, tealights are commonly short and cylindrical, approximately 38 mm (1.5 in) in diameter by 16 mm (0.63 in) high, with white unscented wax.

A standard tealight has a power output of around 32 watts, depending on the wax used. The light produced is about 5 lumens, for a luminous efficacy of about 0.16 lumens per watt.

When used in larger batches, such as at a party, the two criteria most desired are "least amount of smoke" and being long-lasting.

== Cup design ==
The wick is tethered to a piece of metal underneath to stop it from floating to the top of the molten wax and burning out before the wax does.

Tealights have been protected under several patented designs. In some cases, the standard tea light metal cup has been replaced with a clear plastic cup, sometimes made out of polycarbonate plastic. The clear cup allows more light to escape the holder. However, the metal cups are much more common.

== Holders ==
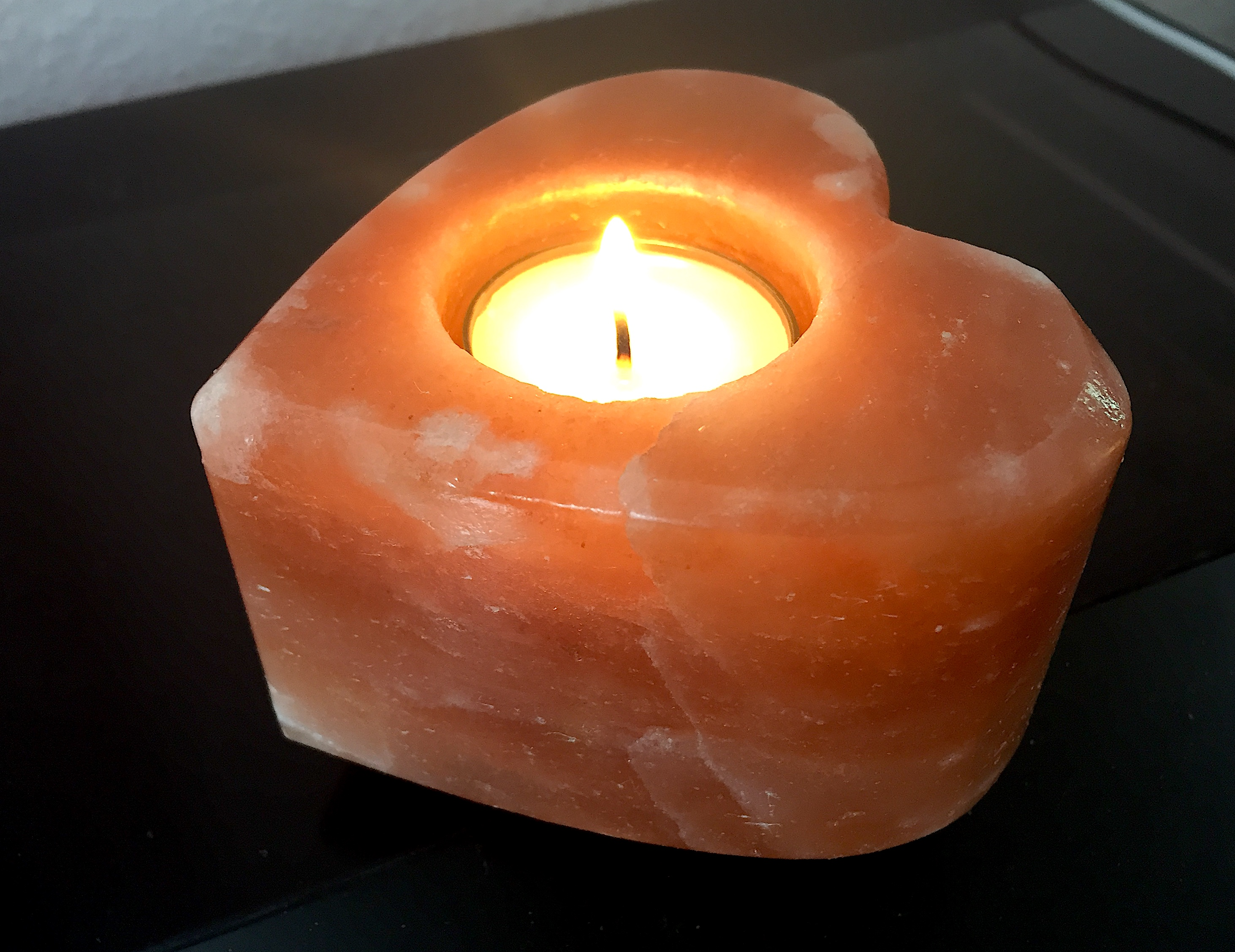
Heart-shaped tealight candle holder from Himalayan salt

When not placed on a tray, tealights are placed in a special holder, which may be pierced or have partly clear walls to allow light to pass through.

From small pockets of glass, metal, ceramic, and other materials to larger, more elaborate tea light lamps, holders come in a wide range of styles, colours, and shapes. They have an appropriately sized cup to use a tealight candle, either scented or unscented. Discount stores, gift stores, and home decor stores often carry an array of holders for these small candles.

== Electrical ==
Electric tealights have become increasingly popular as newer technology becomes available. They can feature incandescent or LED bulbs, the latter becoming the preferred format as LEDs become brighter and more efficient. They can have many different colours to set a mood, match a decor or augment the container's design. Some can simulate a moving flame using mechanical or electronic animations.

Electric tealights are not useful as a source of heat, so they are not suitable for chafing dishes or other food warmers.

== Safety ==
The use of tealights may be prohibited by safety regulations, such as in hospitals.

Electric tealights are much safer than a flame-based tealight, and can be left unattended, as there is no open flame or heat to worry about. This allows them to be placed inside freestanding lace structures, or in candle holders made from paper, wood or other flammable materials. They can also be made much smaller to fit where a large flamed-based tealight cannot.

== See also ==
- Hindenburg light
- Outdoor candle - a tealight-like candle that is lit outdoors
- Samovar
- Tea cosy, an insulated cover also used to keep a teapot warm
- Votive candles (can be taper candle or tealight)
