= Char-Broil =

Manufacturer of barbecue products

Char-Broil, LLC
- Type: Subsidiary
- Founded: 1948; 78 years ago
- Headquarters: Columbus, Georgia, USA
- Key people: Tom Penner, CEO
- Products: Outdoor grills and smokers
- Brands: Char-Broil; Dancook; Oklahoma Joe's; SABER
- Parent: W. C. Bradley Co.
- Website: http://www.charbroil.com/

Char-Broil is an American privately held manufacturer of charcoal, gas & electric outdoor grills, smokers and related products. Char-Broil is a subsidiary of W. C. Bradley Co.

== History ==
=== Early 1900s ===
In 1925, W.C. Bradley Co. acquired a controlling interest in the Columbus Iron Works, which previously made parts for steamboats and stove products. By the 1940s, agriculture started moving west. The Bradley Company adapted quickly, redirecting focus to the "backyard" leisure market and manufactured a portable outdoor cooker called "Char-Broil." The Char-Broil 19 (also known as the CB 19) is thought to be the first cast iron charcoal grill on the market. Hardware stores that carried the Bradley's agricultural and stove supplies begin selling the cast-iron charcoal grill for $19, which were purchased and delivered across the United States.

First Char-Broil charcoal grill.

The early grills were made from a steel drum, and two years later, electric grills were manufactured. Between the Char-Broil brand and Certified Grill Parts, W.C. Bradley Company became a worldwide leader in the manufacture of aluminum gas grills, grill parts and accessories.

=== 1960s - 1970s ===
Due to increased demand for home grills, Char-Broil began to mass-produce gas grills in the 1960s.
In 1961, Char-Broil patented the first grease-handling system for an outdoor grill to make grilling safer and easier. In the 1970s, they were the first to package the LP tank and grill in one box, which revolutionized the backyard grill industry. Char-Broil introduced the first electric grills, portable gas grills and table-top grills in the 1970s. In 1973, the Manufacturing Division moved from the Iron Works to a more modern plant in the Bradley Industrial Park and becomes known as W.C. Bradley Enterprises. Then in 1977, W.C. Bradley Enterprises became known as Char-Broil. In 1989, Char-Broil became a separate business division of the W.C. Bradley Company.

=== 1980s - 1990s ===
In the 1980s, Char-Broil introduced "Certified Parts and Accessories" and began selling grill parts to consumers, and in the 1990s, Char-Broil introduced new paints, easy-to-clean materials and features along with the now-ubiquitous electronic ignition system. In 1997, Char-Broil acquired the New Braunfels Smoker Company and adds heavy-duty charcoal grills, smokers and accessories to its lineup, as well as the barbecue grill division of the Thermos Company of Schaumburg, Illinois. In 1998, Char-Broil purchased the Oklahoma Joe's brand of high-end smokers, grills and accessories, to complement its outdoor cooking selection.

=== 2000s - 2010s ===
Char-Broil launched the Commercial Series brand in 2003. This series was, and still is exclusive to Lowe's Char-Broil partnered with Thermal Engineering Corporation (TEC) to offer backyard chefs infrared technology and patented a new version of the TEC's infrared 100% cooking system, which led the company to a new series of grills and cookers in 2007 They launched the Big Easy oil-less infrared turkey fryer in 2007 with the infrared technology. In 2008, Char-Broil launched the RED Series infrared gas grills that is exclusive to Home Depot. In 2011, Char-Broil introduced SABER grills, which is a dedicated business unit for premium grills, and they expanded into the European market with the acquisition of the Dancook brand. Early 2015, Char-Broil introduced the Kettleman, an improved charcoal kettle grill that uses the patented infrared technology, no-fall through grates, no flare-ups, a hinged lid. Then in the summer of 2015, Char-Broil launched its new line of digital electric smokers, and later in the year, they launched the SmartChef series of WiFi-connected electric smokers, which stemmed from the partnership with DADO.

== Awards and mentions ==
- 1984: Char-Broil CB940 grill is cited as the "World's Best BBQ Grill" in the Book of Bests.
- 1999: The Patio Bistro won the Honorable Mention Award in new Products for Mature Markets Design Competition from the American Society of Aging.
- 2000: Golden Hammer Award Winner in Outdoor Living.
- 2001-2002: Popular Mechanics Editors Choice Award in recognition of outstanding achievement in new product design and innovation.
- 2003-2008: Silver Award Winner in Barbecue by Home Channel News.
- 2008: Char-Broil's Big Easy oil-less infrared turkey fryer wins a VESTA Award at the HPBA Expo.
- 2011: Char-Broil won the first and sixth place Award of Excellence by National Barbecue Association for the Pinch of Sizzle Mystic Marinade and Pinch of Sizzle Mad Mustard seasonings.
- 2013: Char-Broil TRU-Infrared Thin grill won the Gold Medal Honor at the International BBQ Awards in Friedrichshafen, Germany.

== Brands ==
As of 2015, brands managed and/or manufactured by Char-Broil include:

- Char-Broil
- Dancook
- Oklahoma Joe's
- Quantum
- SABER
- Thermos
- PBC
