= Hindenburg light =

Candle used in the First World War

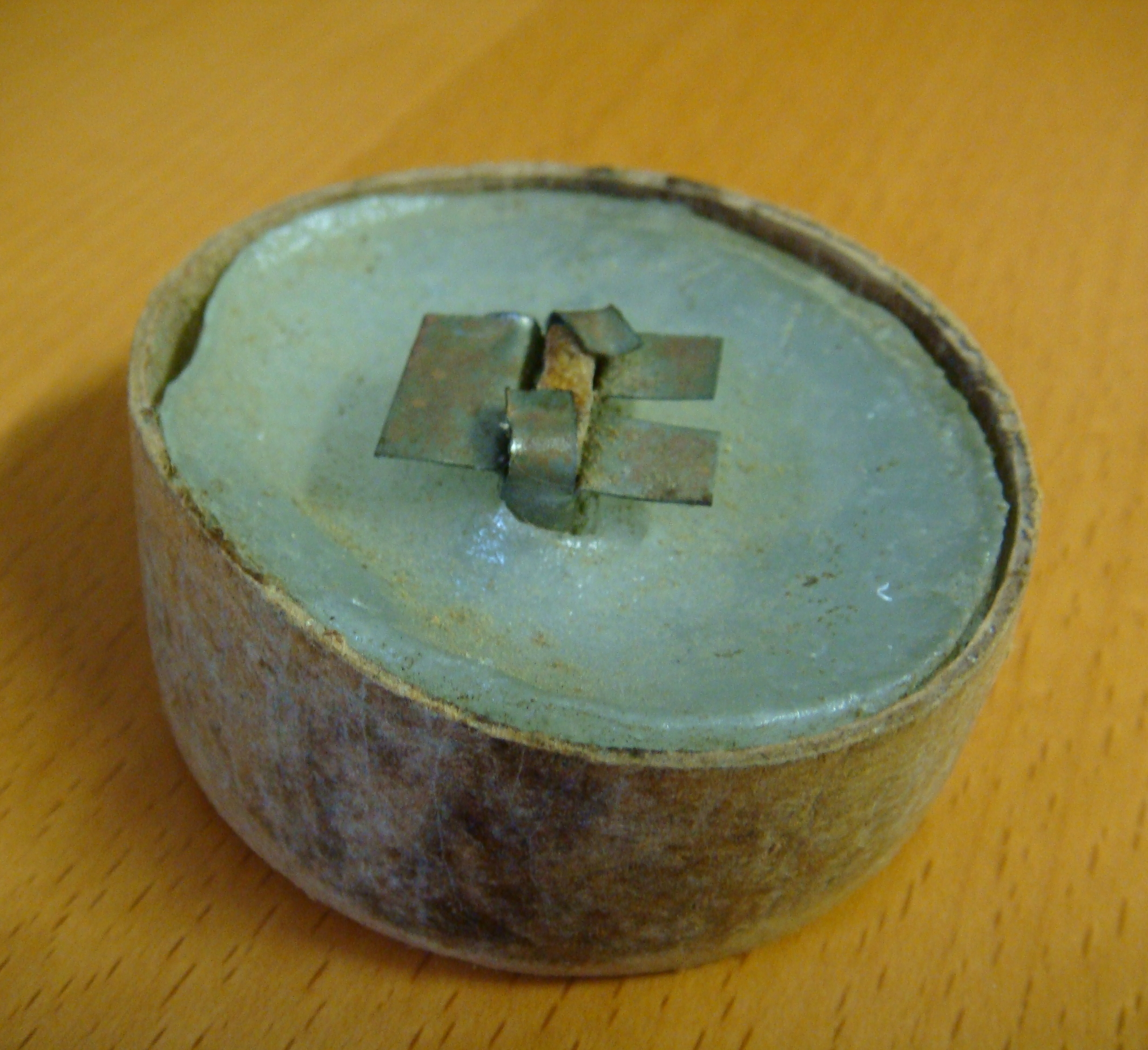
Hindenburg light, around 1943-1945, Museum Geiserschmiede Bühlertal

The Hindenburg light or Hindenburglicht was a source of tallow lighting used in the trenches of the First World War, named after the Commander-in-Chief of the German army in World War I, Paul von Hindenburg. It was a flat bowl approximately 5–8 cm (2–3 in) in diameter and 1–1.5 cm (0.4–0.6 in) deep, resembling the cover of Mason jar lid (Schraubglasdeckel) and made from paperboard. This flat bowl was filled with a wax-like fat (tallow). A short wick (Docht) in the center was lit and burned for some hours.

A later model of the Hindenburglicht was a "tin can (Dosenlicht) lamp." Here, a wax-filled tin can have two wicks in a holder. If both wicks are lit, a common, broad flame (zungenfoermige Flamme) results.

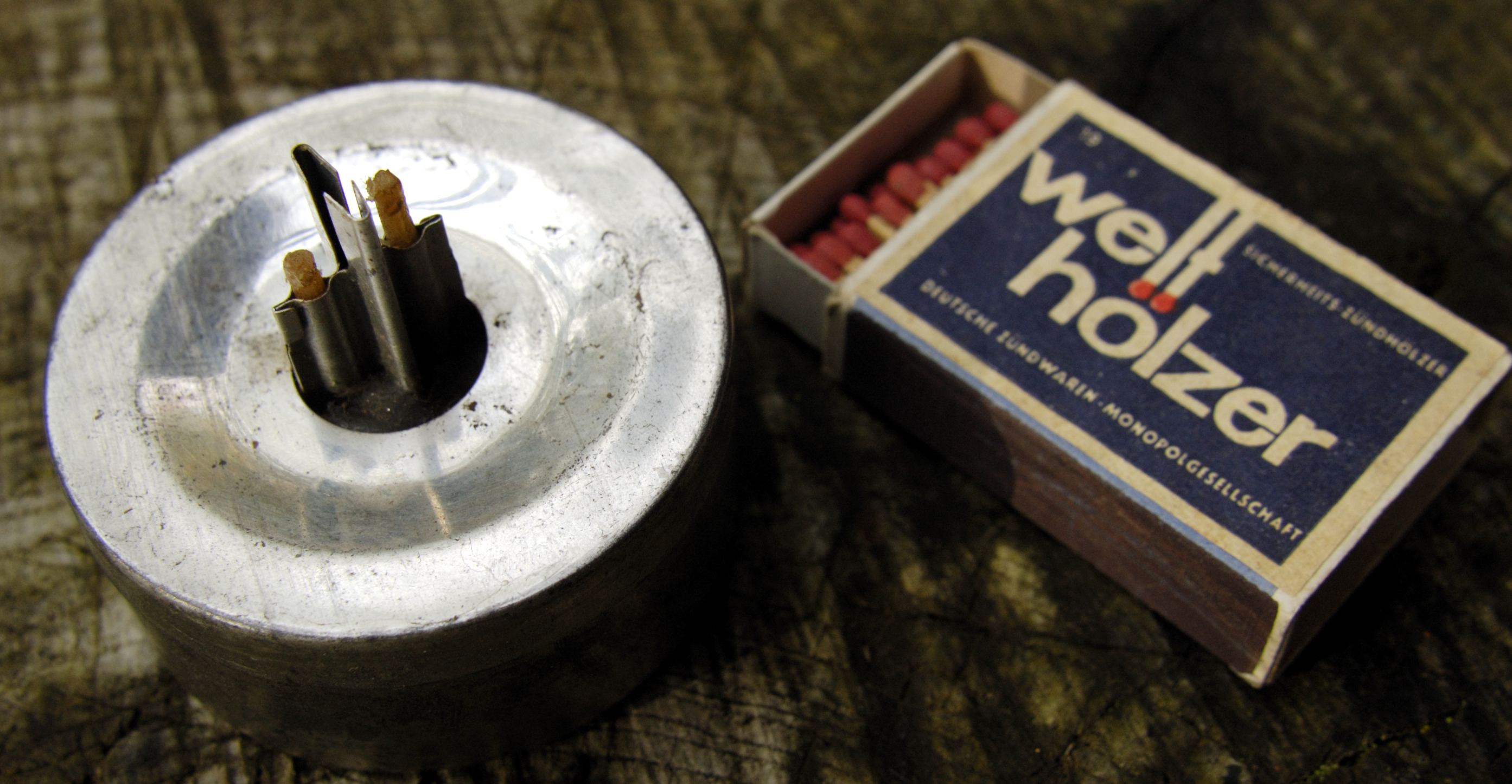
Tin can lamp (Dosenlicht)

The lights were also used in World War II in air raid shelters (Luftschutzkeller) or during power cuts, and mandated black outs as emergency lighting.

The Hindenburg light is mentioned in the novels Stalingrad, "Die Entdeckung der Currywurst" by Uwe Timm and Berlin by Theodore Plievier, as used on the Eastern Front and in air raid shelters respectively. Also it is mentioned in Wheels of Terror by Sven Hassel and In Deadly Combat: A German Soldier's Memoir of the Eastern Front by Gottlob Herbert Biedermann.

== See also ==
- Solid fuel
- Tealight
