= Candlenut oil =

Oil from the nut of Aleurites moluccanus

Candlenut oil or kukui nut oil is extracted from the nut of Aleurites moluccanus (Aleurites triloba), the candlenut or kuku'i.

== Description ==
The candlenut tree is widely distributed through Polynesia and Madagascar, and is found in Hawaii, South Asia, and China, and has been introduced into the West Indies. The oil from the nut is of commercial value, and is included in the drying oils and is used as an illuminating oil. Solvent extraction of the oil from the crushed kernel yields a light yellow oil (density 0.92 g/cm^{3} (0.033 lb/cu in)); when obtained by expression (pressing), the oil may be dark from impurities. Roughly half the weight of the kernel is oil.

A sample of the oil obtained by petroleum extraction had a saponification value of 179.1 (generally 190–205), an iodine number of 155.5 (generally 135–165, as low as 114), and a Reichert value of 2.82. The oil acts as a mild cathartic similar to castor oil, while the cake remaining from pressing also acts as a purgative if ingested.

The oil typically contains 15% oleic acid, 40% linoleic acid, and less than 30% linolenic acid. Analysis of nut oil samples from Polynesia (Hawaii, Tonga) over a 10-year period showed no change in fatty acid composition - that is about 6% palmitic acid, 2-3% stearic acid, 15-18% linoleic acid, and 30-33% linolenic acid. Oils from Maritime Southeast Asia (Indonesia, East Timor) had different unsaturated content, with 20-25% oleic, 34-42% linoleic, and 27-32% linolenic acid, with palmitic and stearic acid contents similar.

Analysis of a different sample of candlenut kernel seed oil from either solvent (hexane soxhlet) or supercritical carbon dioxide extraction showed around 54% stearic acid, 16% oleic acid, 20% linoleic acid, and less than 3% linolenic acid.

In Indonesia, the candlenut oil can often be found in hair care products. Historically, it has been valued as an emollient, and is currently used primarily in skin-care products.

== Synonyms ==
It is also known as Spanish walnut (Jamaica), Belgaum walnut oil (India), and kekune oil (Sri Lanka).

== See also ==
- Tung oil, oil of Vernicia fordii - the oil of Aleurites cordata (now V. cordata) yields "Japanese tung oil".
