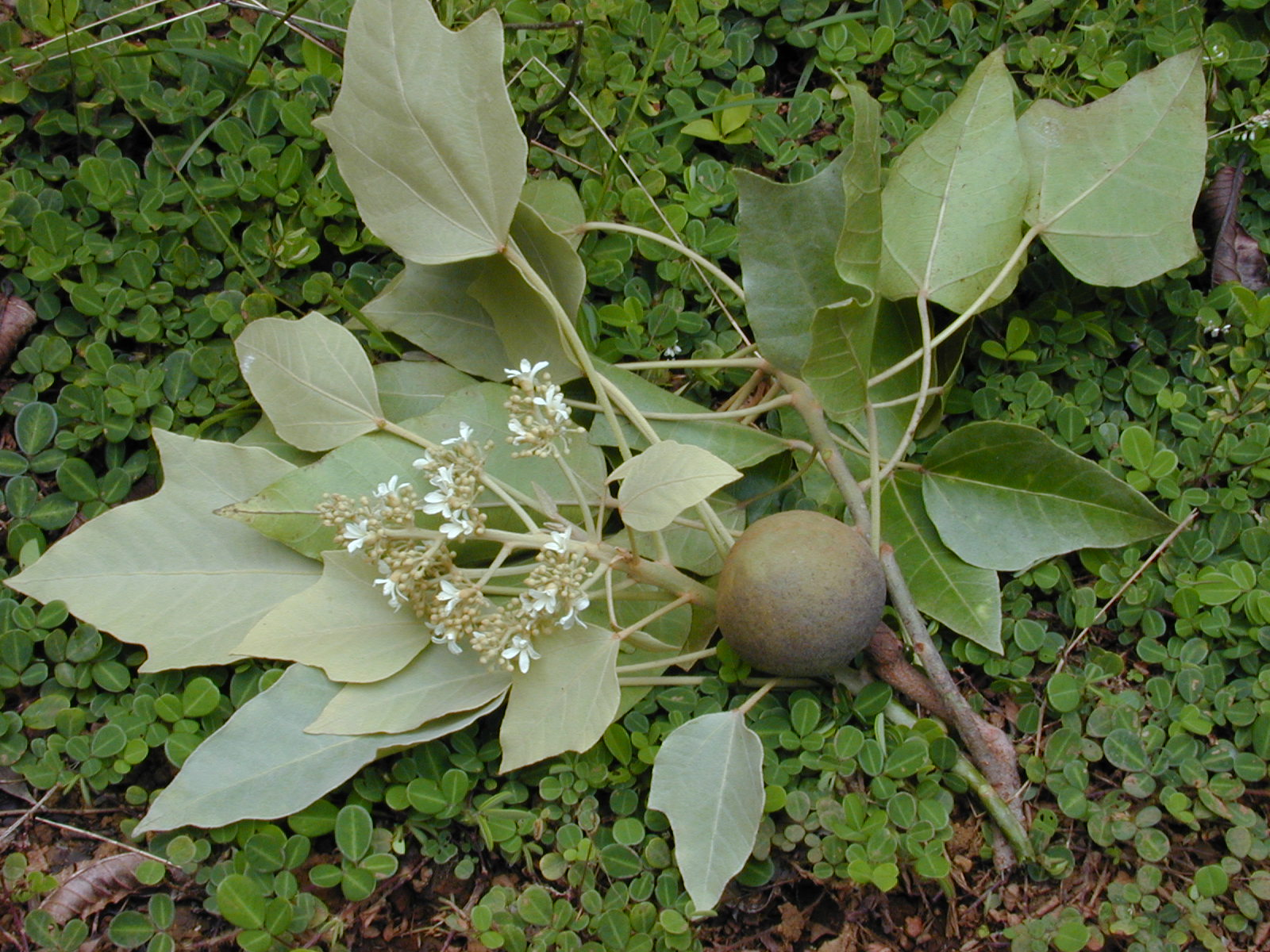
- Candlenut foliage, flowers, and nut

Conservation status
- Least Concern (IUCN 3.1)

Scientific classification
- Kingdom: Plantae
- Clade: Embryophytes
- Clade: Tracheophytes
- Clade: Angiosperms
- Clade: Eudicots
- Clade: Rosids
- Order: Malpighiales
- Family: Euphorbiaceae
- Genus: Aleurites
- Species: A. moluccanus

Binomial name
- Aleurites moluccanus (L.) Willd.

Synonyms
- Aleurites javanicus Gand. Aleurites moluccana Aleurites pentaphyllus Wall. ex Langeron; Aleurites remyi Sherff; Aleurites trilobus J.R.Forst. & G.Forst. Jatropha moluccana L.

= Aleurites moluccanus =

Candlenut

Species of tree

Aleurites moluccanus, commonly known as candlenut, Indian walnut or, in Hawaii, kukui, is a tree in the spurge family Euphorbiaceae. It grows to about 30 m (98 ft) tall and produces drupe fruit.

First described by Carl Linnaeus in 1753, the species' origin is unclear due to its spread by humans, but it can be found in many tropical rainforests and gallery forests. Various parts of the plant have regional or cultural uses.

== Description ==
The candlenut tree grows to a height of up to 30 m (98 ft), with wide spreading or pendulous branches. The leaves are pale green, simple, and ovate or heart-shaped on mature shoots, but may be three-, five-, or seven-lobed on saplings. They are up to 20 cm (8 in) long and 13 cm (5 in) wide and young leaves are densely clothed in rusty or cream stellate hairs. Petioles measure up to 12.5 cm (5 in) long and stipules about 5 mm (1/4 in).

The flowers are small; male flowers measure around 5 mm in diameter, female flowers about 9 mm.

The fruit is a drupe about 4–6 cm (1 1/2–2 1/4 in) in diameter with one or two lobes; each lobe has a single soft, white, oily kernel contained within a hard shell about 2 cm (3/4 in) in diameter.

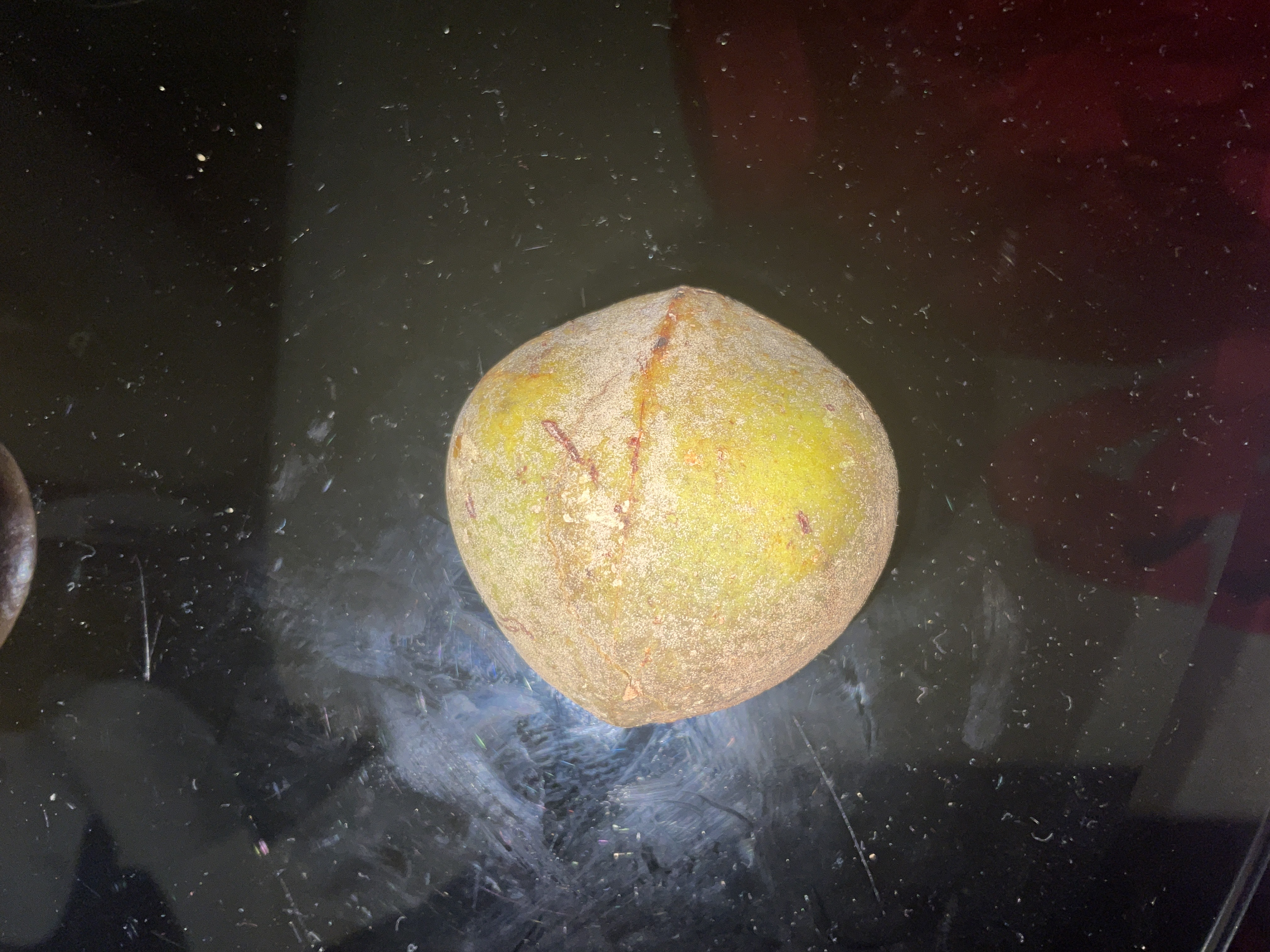
Candlenut fallen fruit

These nuts, upon germinating, produce cotyledons or seed leaves up to 9 cm (3.5 in) long by 5.5 cm (2.2 in) wide.

== Taxonomy ==
This plant was first described by Carl Linnaeus in his Species Plantarum (1753) as Jatropha moluccana. It was renamed as Aleurites moluccana by Carl Ludwig Willdenow in an 1805 edition of Species Plantarum, but the ending was corrected to match the gender of the Latin genus Aleurites moluccanus.

While there are many online references to the spelling "Aleurites moluccana", this is not accepted by botanical authorities such as the International Plant Names Index or the Germplasm Resources Information Network.

=== Etymology ===
The genus name derives from the Ancient Greek ἄλευρον (áleuron), meaning "flour" or "meal", and refers to the new growth which appears to be dusted with flour. The species epithet means "from the Moluccas".

== Distribution and habitat ==
Its native range is impossible to establish precisely because of early spread by humans, and the tree is now distributed throughout the New and Old World tropics including the Indian subcontinent, Southeast Asia, Papuasia, Queensland in Australia, and some islands of the western Pacific Ocean.

The candlenut was first domesticated on the islands of Southeast Asia. Remains of harvested candlenuts have been recovered from archaeological sites in Timor and Morotai in eastern Indonesia, dated to around 13,000 and 11,000 BP, respectively. Archaeological evidence of candlenut cultivation is also found in Neolithic sites of the Toalean culture in southern Sulawesi dated to around 3,700 to 2,300 BP. Early Austronesian voyagers introduced candlenuts, as a canoe plant, widely across the Pacific islands; the trees became naturalized to high volcanic islands.

A. moluccanus grows in tropical rainforests and gallery forests. It is a very fast-growing tree and often appears in disturbed rainforest. In Australia the altitudinal range is from sea level to 800 m (2,600 ft).

== Ecology ==
In Australia the seeds are eaten by rodents, in particular the giant white-tailed rat. The broken shells of the fruits are often found underneath the trees.

The larvae of the coleopteran Agrianome fairmairei feed on dead candlenut wood, and are considered a delicacy in New Caledonia.

== Toxicity ==
Because the seeds contain saponin, phorbol, and toxalbumins, they are mildly toxic when raw, inducing a laxative effect. Heat treatment reduces the toxicity of the protein component.

== Uses ==
=== Culinary ===
While mildly toxic when raw, the nut is appreciated in many cultures once cooked or toasted. In Indonesian and Malaysian cuisine, it is commonly used in curries, and on the Indonesian island of Java, it is used to make a thick sauce that is eaten with vegetables and rice.

A Hawaiian condiment known as ʻinamona is made from roasted kukui mixed into a paste with salt. ʻInamona is a key ingredient in traditional Hawaiian poke.

=== Other uses ===
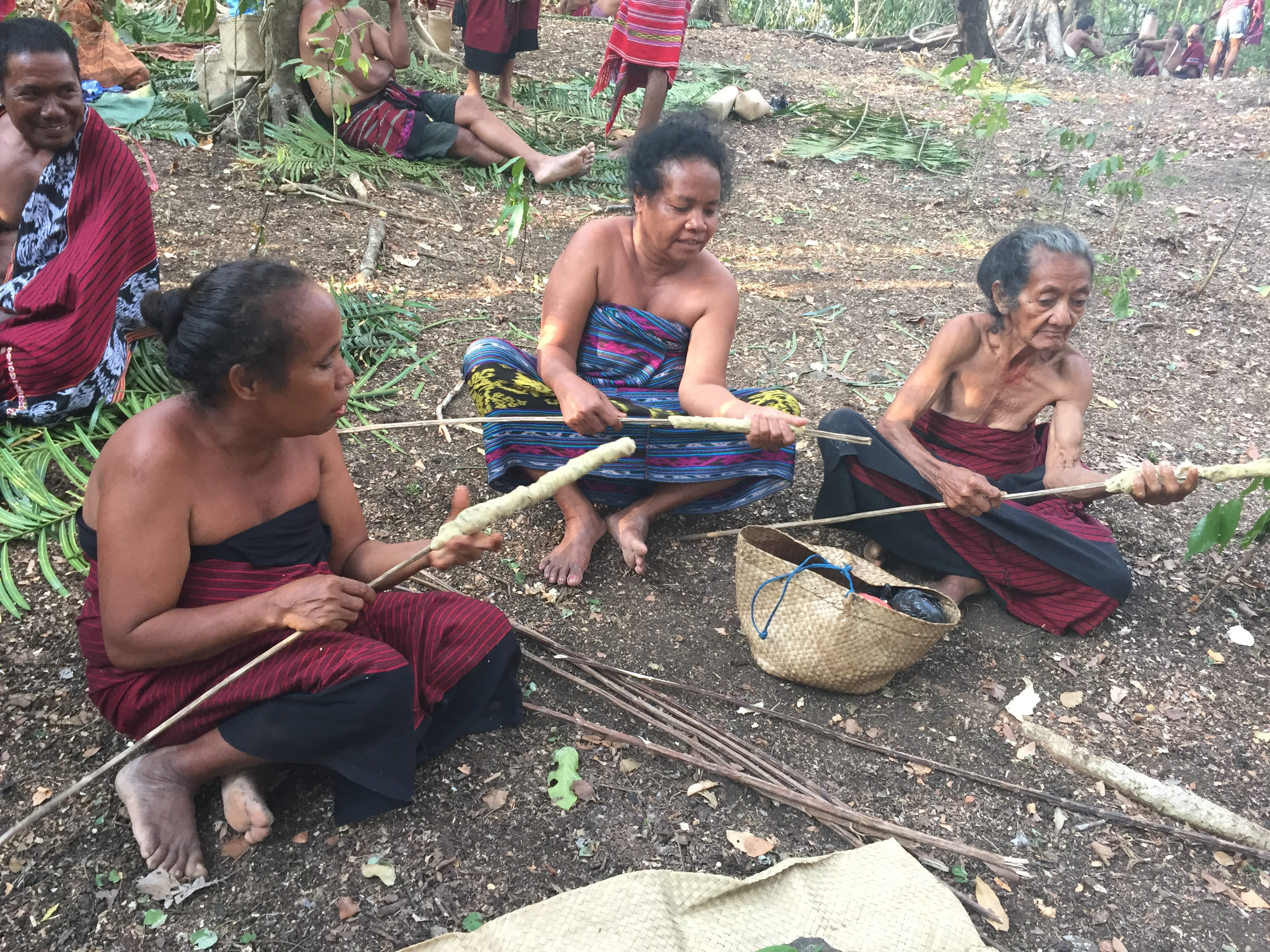
Women in East Timor preparing candlenut sticks to illuminate a festival

The kernel is the source of candlenut oil, which has no known toxicity and is not an irritant, even to the eyes.

In ancient Hawaiʻi, kukui fruits were burned to provide light. The nuts were strung in a row on a palm leaf midrib, lit on one end, and burned one by one every fifteen minutes or so. This led to their use as a measure of time. Hawaiians extracted the oil from the nut and burned it in a stone oil lamp called a kukui hele po (light, darkness goes) with a wick made of kapa cloth.

Hawaiians had many other uses for the tree, including leis from the shells, leaves, and flowers; ink for tattoos from charred nuts; a varnish with the oil; and fishermen would chew the nuts and spit them on the water to break the surface tension and remove reflections, giving them greater underwater visibility. A red-brown dye made from the inner bark was used on kapa and aho (Touchardia latifolia cordage). A coating of kukui oil helped preserve ʻupena (fishing nets). The nohona waʻa (seats) and pale (gunwales) of waʻa (outrigger canoes) were made from the wood. The trunk was sometimes used to make smaller canoes used for fishing.

The oil can often be found in Indonesian hair-care products. In Fiji, where the nut is called sikeci, the oil is used in cosmetic products.

Wealthier members of the Batak people have their coffins (Karo: pelangkah) made from the wood, carved in the shape of a boat whose bow is decorated with the carved head of a hornbill, a horse, or a mythical beast known as a singa.

In the Philippines, the fruit and tree are traditionally known as lumbang, after which Lumban, a lakeshore town in Laguna province, is named. Before the intrusion of non-native species, it was frequently used as a property-line marker because its silvery underleaf makes the tree easy to distinguish from a distance.

In the state of Sabah, Malaysian Borneo, the Dusun tribes call the fruit godou and use it in tattoo-making as an optional ingredient for the ink.

As recently as 1993 on the outlying islands of the kingdom of Tonga, candlenuts were chewed into sweet-scented emollient used during a traditional funerary ritual. They were used for making various sweet-smelling oils for the skin. In Australia, Aboriginal Australians used them for a variety of similar purposes.

In Flores near Ende, it is called kéloré and used as a mordant for dyes with Morinda citrifolia (mengkudu).

On the island of Rapa Iti in the Austral Islands, fish hooks were carved from the endocarp of the candlenut as a result of lacking other suitable material. These fish hooks were quite small and were used for catching certain species of fish, such as Leptoscarus vaigiensis (Komokomo) and Stegastes fasciolatus (Nganga).

== In culture ==
The plant is also known by the common names candleberry, Indian walnut, kemiri, varnish tree, nuez de la India, buah keras, godou, kukui tree, and rata kekuna.

The Proto-Austronesian word for candlenut is reconstructed as *kamiri, with modern cognates including Hanunó'o, Iban, and Sundanese muncang; Javanese and Malay kemiri; and Tetun kamii; however, the Oceanian words for candlenut is believed to be derived from Proto-Austronesian *CuSuR which became Proto-Malayo-Polynesian *tuhuR, originally meaning "string together, as beads", referring to the construction of the candlenut torches. It became Proto-Eastern-Malayo-Polynesian and Proto-Oceanic *tuRi which is then reduplicated. Modern cognates including Fijian, Tongan, Rarotongan, and Niue tui-tui; and Hawaiian kui-kui or kukui.

The Malay language in both has another name given to the nut which is buah keras (literally "hard fruit").

In Uganda, the seed is referred to as kabakanjagala, meaning "the king loves me".

In Maui, the kukui is a symbol of enlightenment, protection, and peace. Kamapuaʻa, the hog-man fertility demigod, was said to be able to transform into a kukui tree. One of the legends told of Kamapuaʻa: one day, a man beat his wife to death and buried her beneath Kamapuaʻa while he was in tree form. Kukui was named the state tree of Hawaii on 1 May 1959 due to its multitude of uses. It also represents the island of Molokaʻi, whose symbolic color is the silvery green of the kukui leaf.

== Gallery ==
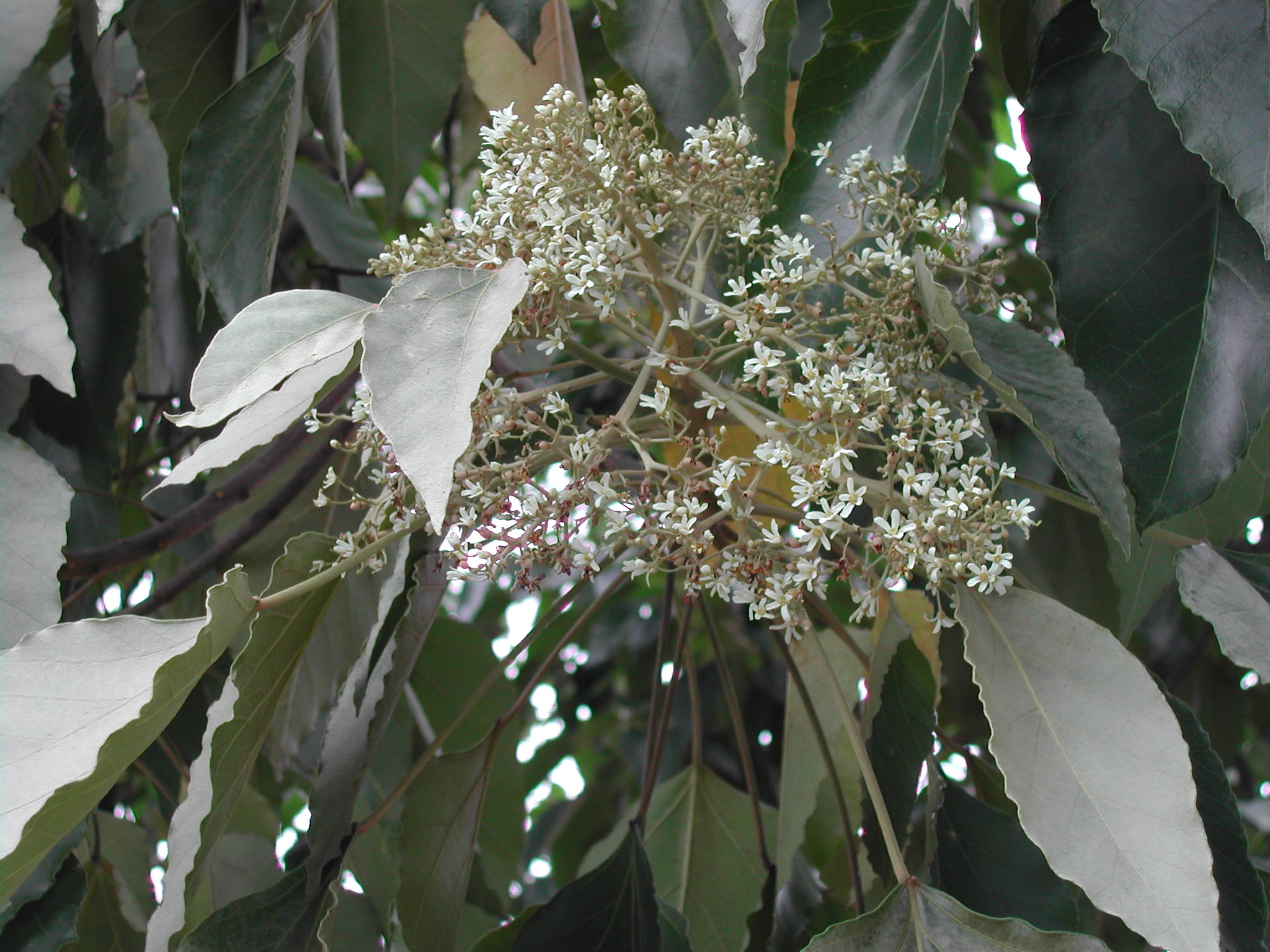
Flowers

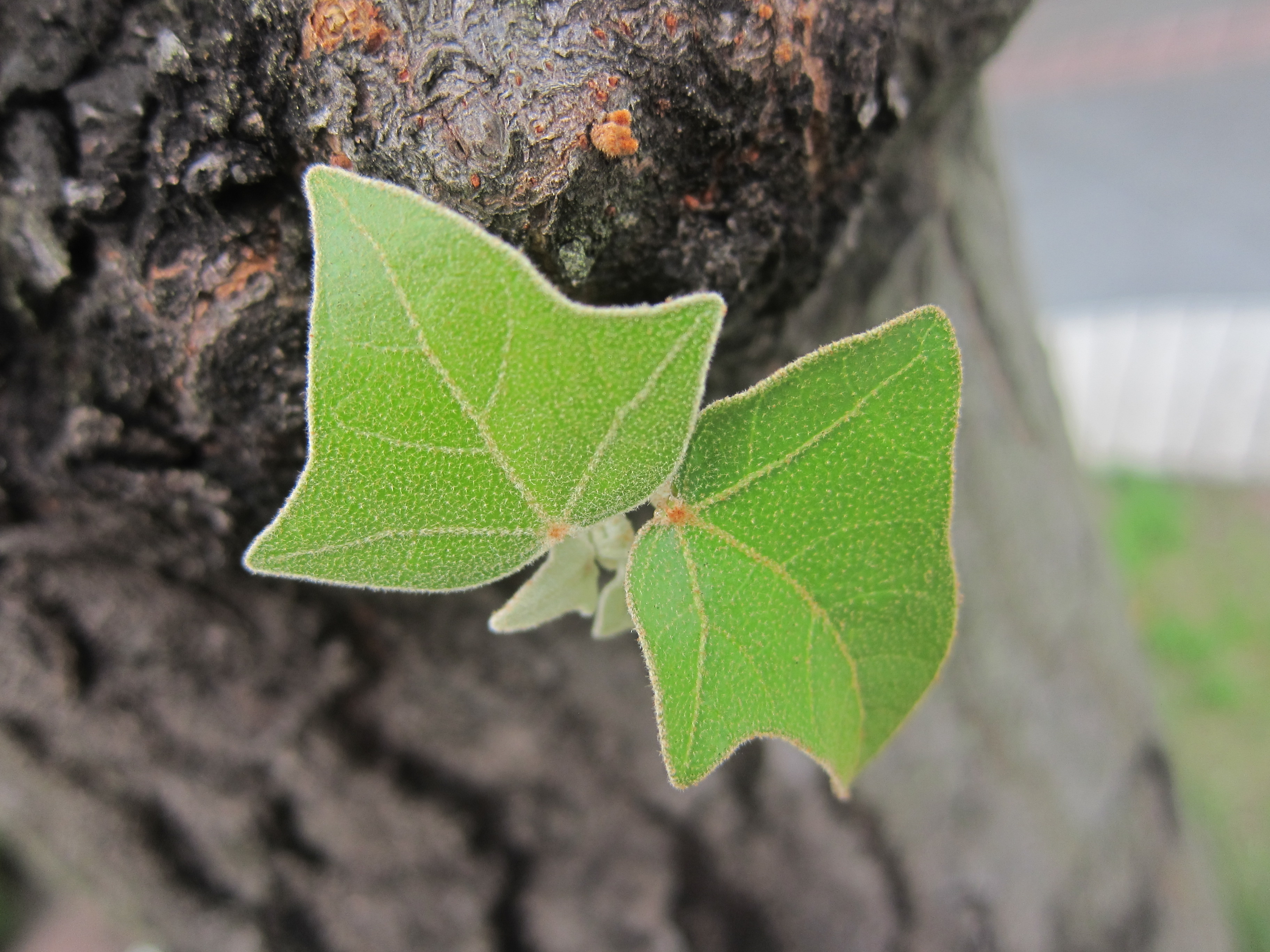
Young leaves demonstrating their hairy character

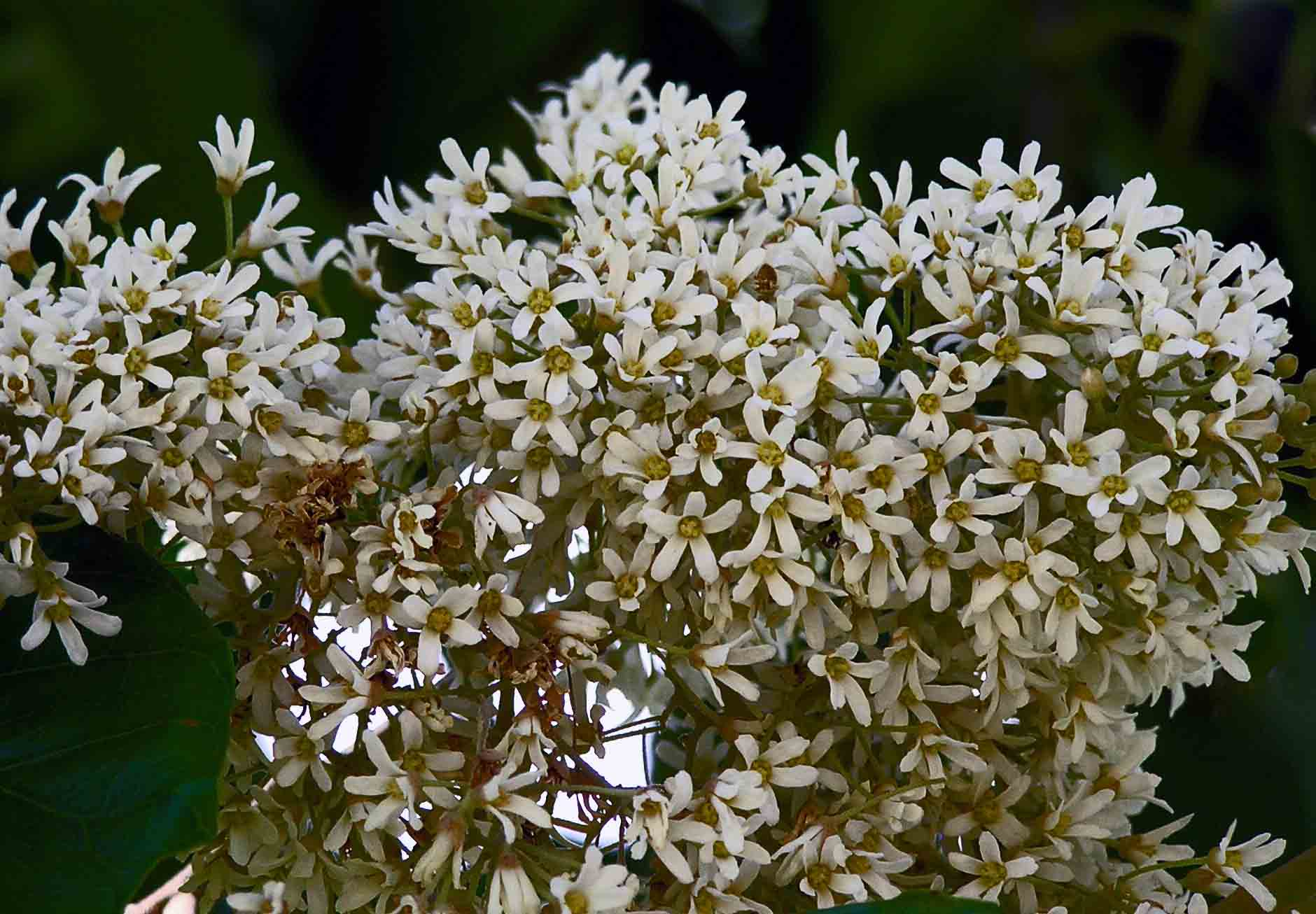
Inflorescence

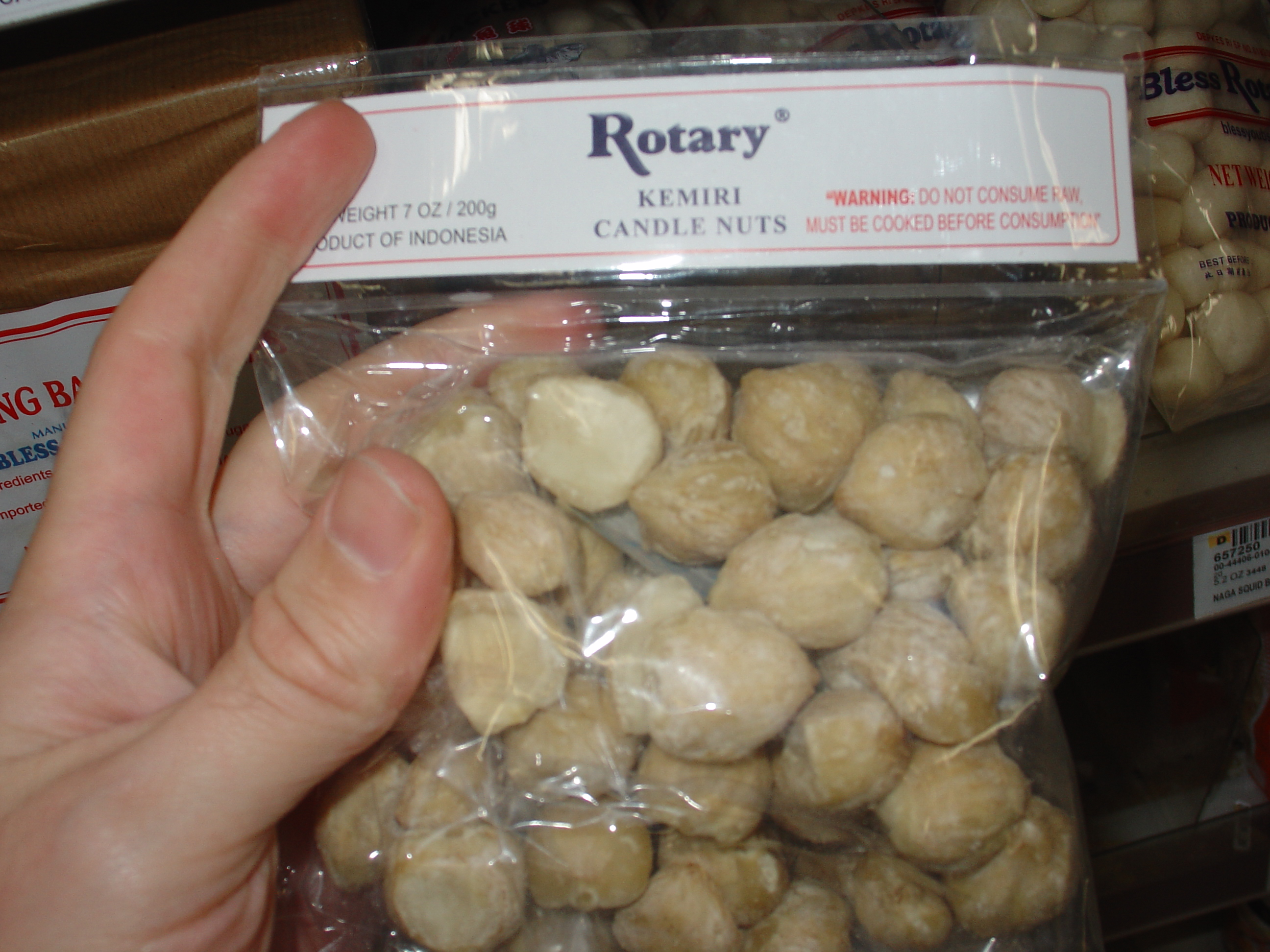
Candlenuts (kemiri) from Indonesia

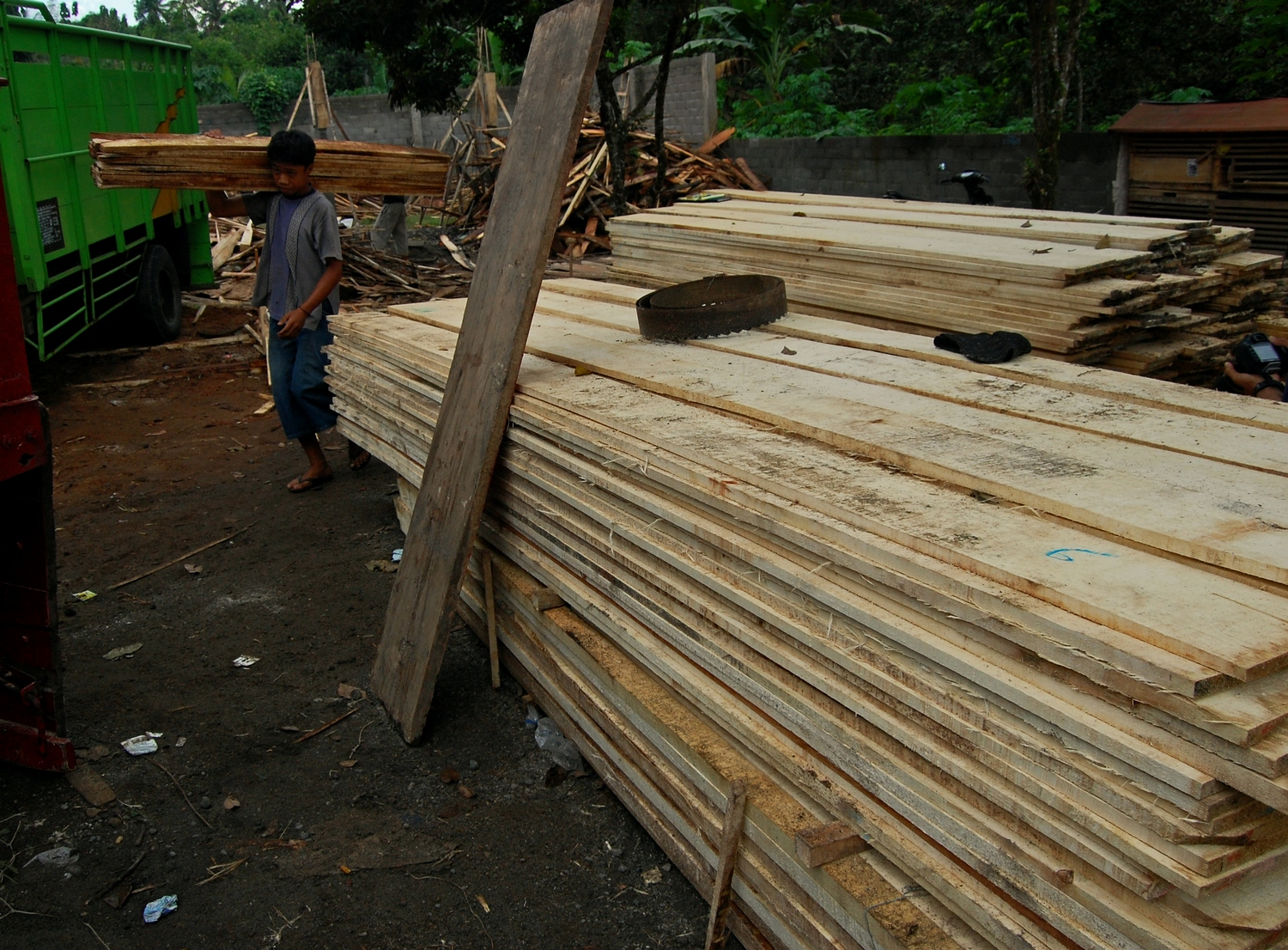
Sawn timber, Lombok, Indonesia

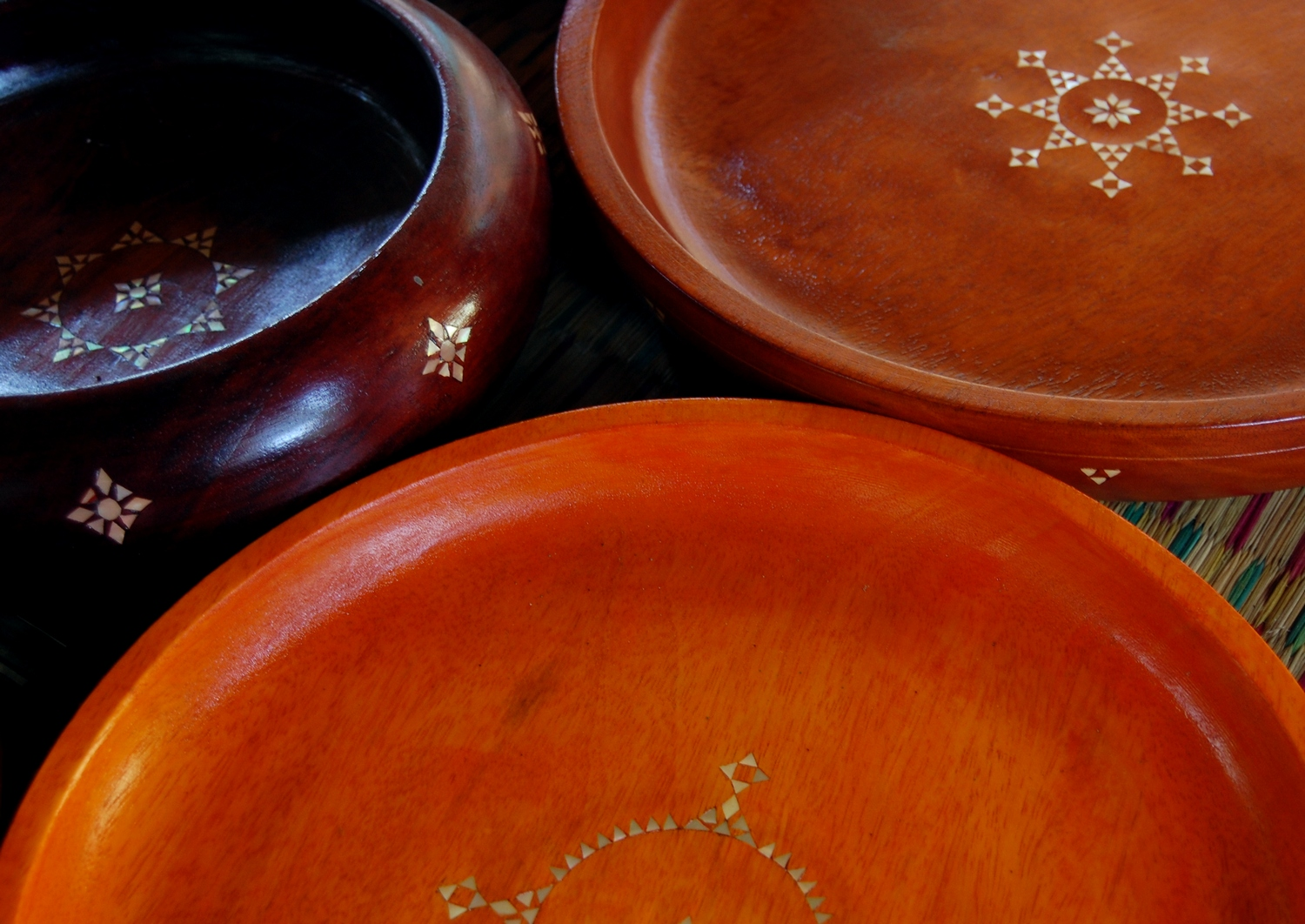
Wood handicraft made from timber of this species, Lombok, Indonesia

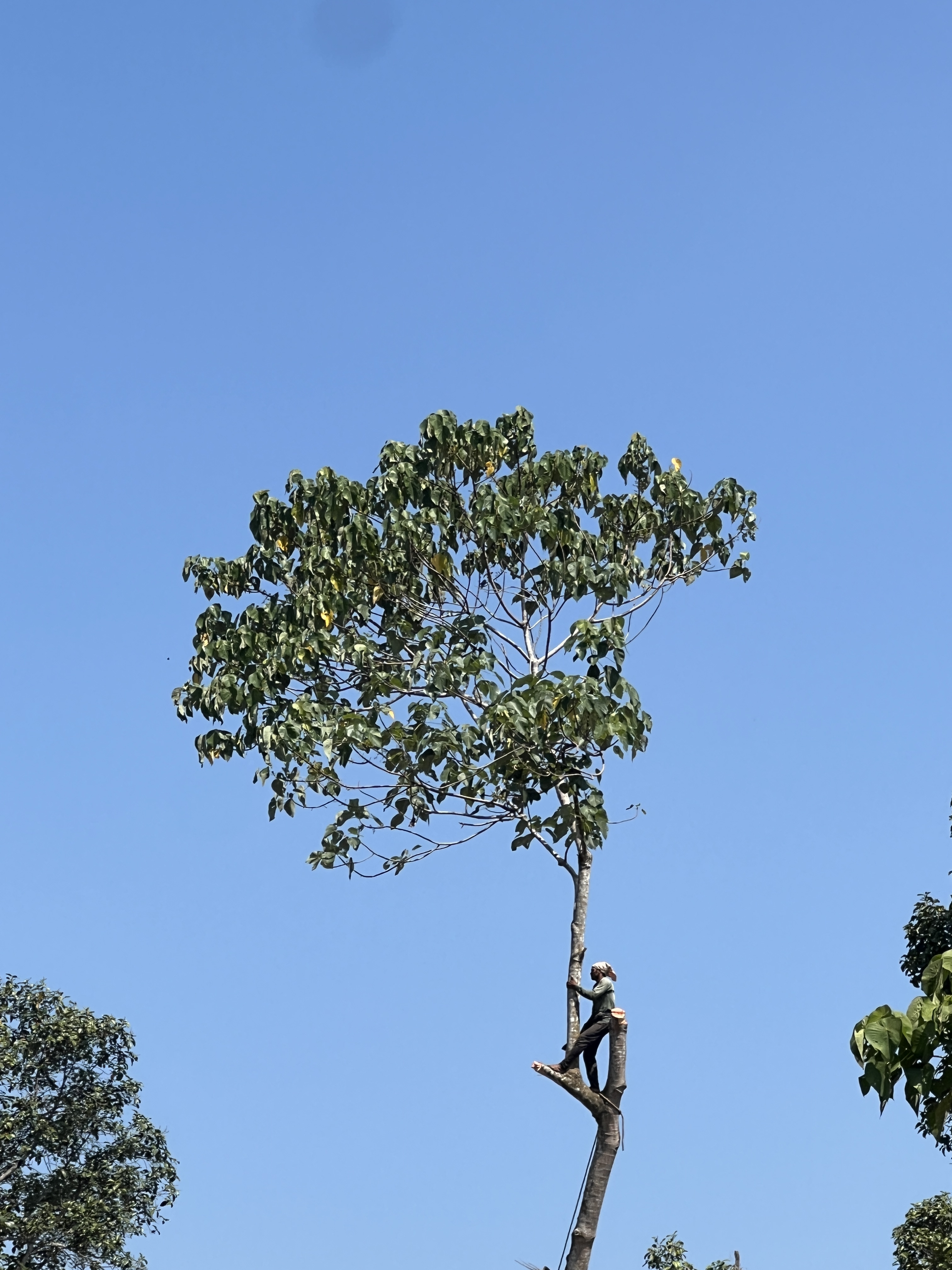
Aleurites moluccanus tree from Kerala, India

== See also ==
- Domesticated plants and animals of Austronesia
- Candlenut oil
