= Candle wick =

String in a candle that holds the flame

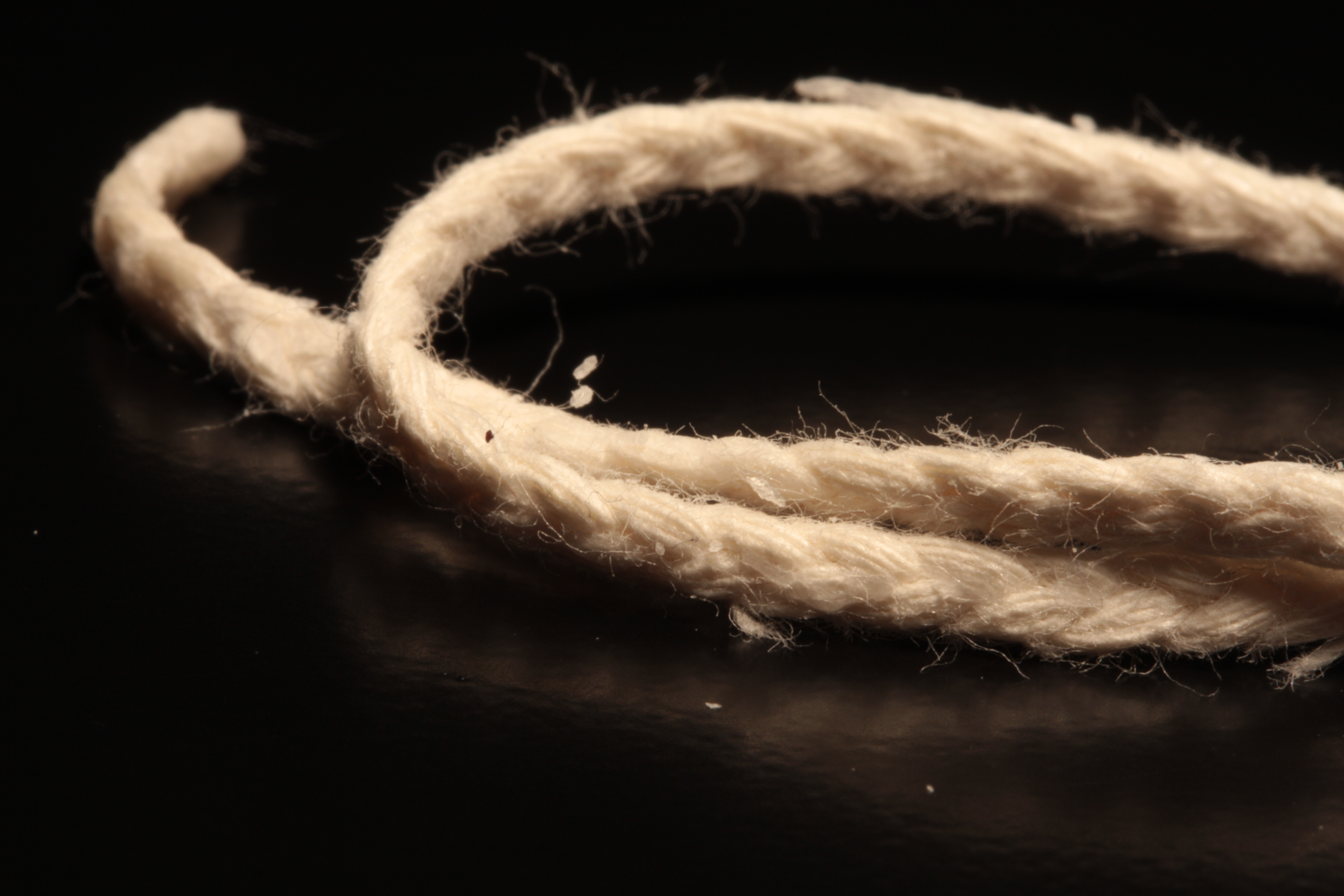
Wick of a candle

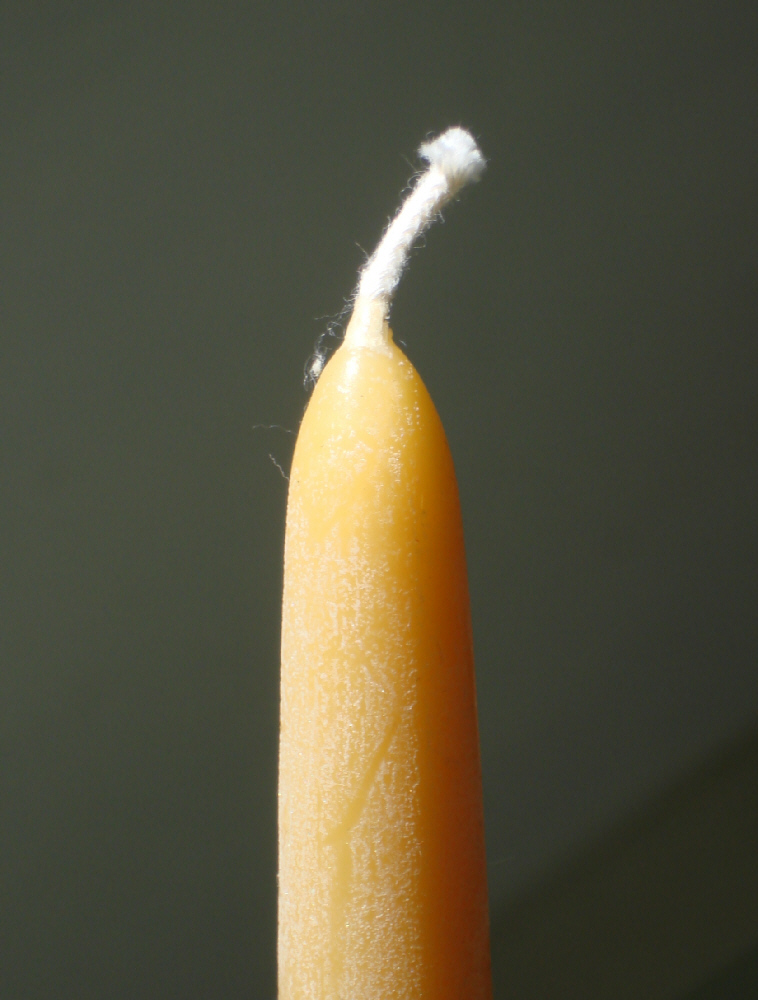
Candle wick in a candle

A candle wick or lamp wick is usually made of braided cotton that holds the flame of a candle or oil lamp. A candle wick works by capillary action, conveying ("wicking") the fuel to the flame. When the liquid fuel, typically melted candle wax, reaches the flame it then vaporizes and combusts. In other words, the wick brings the liquified wax up into the flame to burn. The candle wick influences how the candle burns. Important characteristics of the wick include diameter, stiffness, fire-resistance, and tethering.

== Types ==
Wicks are sometimes braided flat, so that as they burn they also curl back into the flame, thus making them self-consuming. The wick sizes determine the amount of fuel brought into the flame. Prior to the introduction of these wicks, specialty scissors were used to trim the excess wick without extinguishing the flame.

Large diameter wicks typically result in a larger flame, a larger pool of melted wax, and the candle burning faster.

In tealights, the wick is tethered to a piece of metal to stop it from floating to the top of the molten wax and burning before the wax does. Candles designed to float in water require not only a tether for the wick, but also a seal on the bottom of the candle to prevent the wick from wicking water and extinguishing the flame.

Wicks can be made of material other than string or cord, such as wood and (historically) even asbestos, although they are rare. The 17th century rushlight and rush candles also uses rush-pith. The cotton of tampons can be used as wicks for oil lamps in wilderness survival situations.

=== Specific types ===
- Core-less braided cotton
- Flat cotton braid with woven-in paper
- Pre-waxed flat cotton braid
- Wooden
- Zinc core with braided cotton sleeve
- Flexible

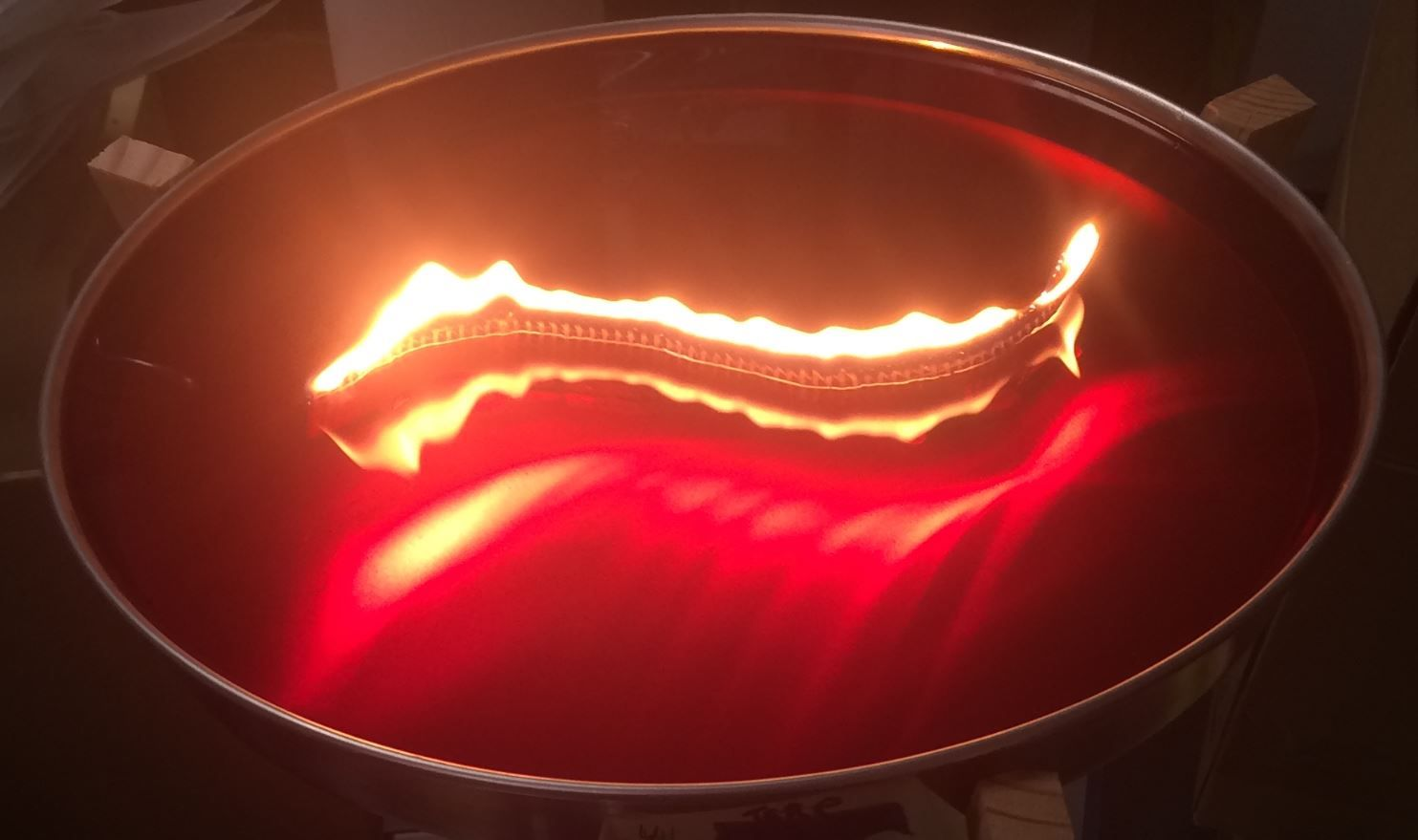
Flexible wick burning in wax

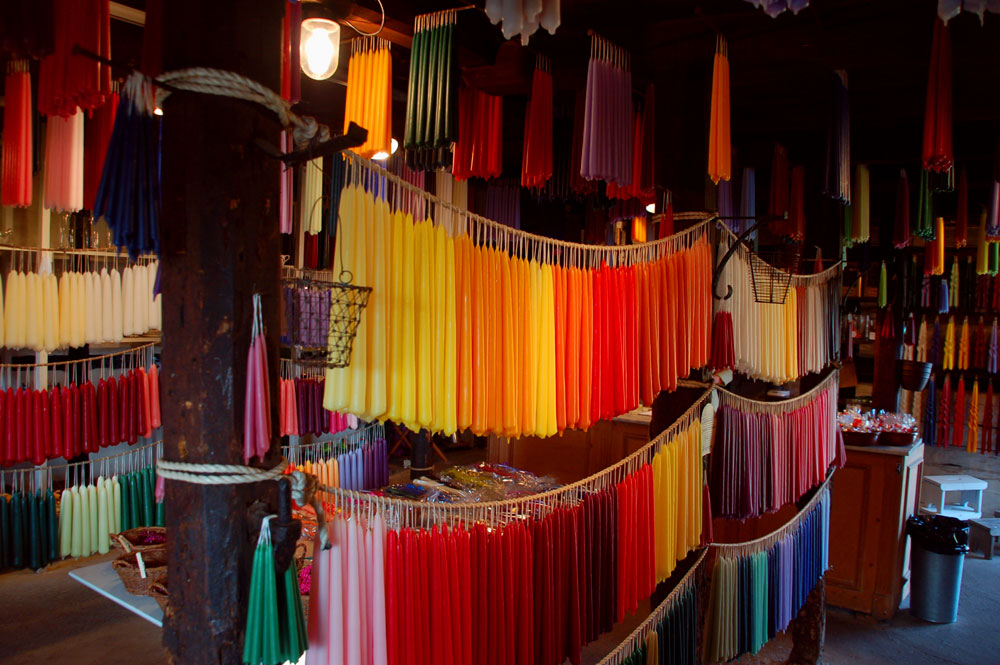
Dipped candles hanging by their wicks

== History ==
Wicked candles initially started to be used by ancient Egyptians in 3000 B.C. Wicked candles were assumed to be made by waxes from available plants and animals in this time period.

During this time, the Chinese were using rice paper to create wicks and made wax out of insects and seeds.

== Stiffeners ==
Stiffeners are used to direct the wick to remaining upright so that fuel can get to the flame. This provides two advantages: it makes the wick more rigid, letting it stand further out of the liquid wax, and it conducts heat downward, melting the wax more readily. The latter is particularly important in candles made of harder wax.

Stiffeners were once made of lead, but these have been banned in the US for several years by the Consumer Product Safety Commission, due to the concerns about lead poisoning. Fine wire (such as copper) can be included in the wick. Other core stiffeners, such as paper and synthetic fibers, may also be used. The CPSC was petitioned to ban candle wicks containing lead cores and candles with such wicks by Public Citizen, the National Apartment Association, and National Multi Housing Council on February 20, 2001. The ban against manufacturing, importing, or selling candles in the US with lead wicks became effective in October 2003.

== Pretreatments ==
Virtually all wicks are treated with various flame-resistant solutions in a process known as mordanting. Without mordanting the wick would be destroyed by the flames and the flow of melted wax to the flame would cease. Beyond that, wicks can be treated with substances to improve the color and brightness of the flame, provide better rigidity to keep the wick out of the melted wax, and improve the flow of that wax up the wick. Common treatments are borax and salt which are dissolved in water in which the wicks are soaked. Wicks can also be pretreated with paraffin wax.

== See also ==
- Fuse (explosives)
