= Flameless candle =

Electronic light

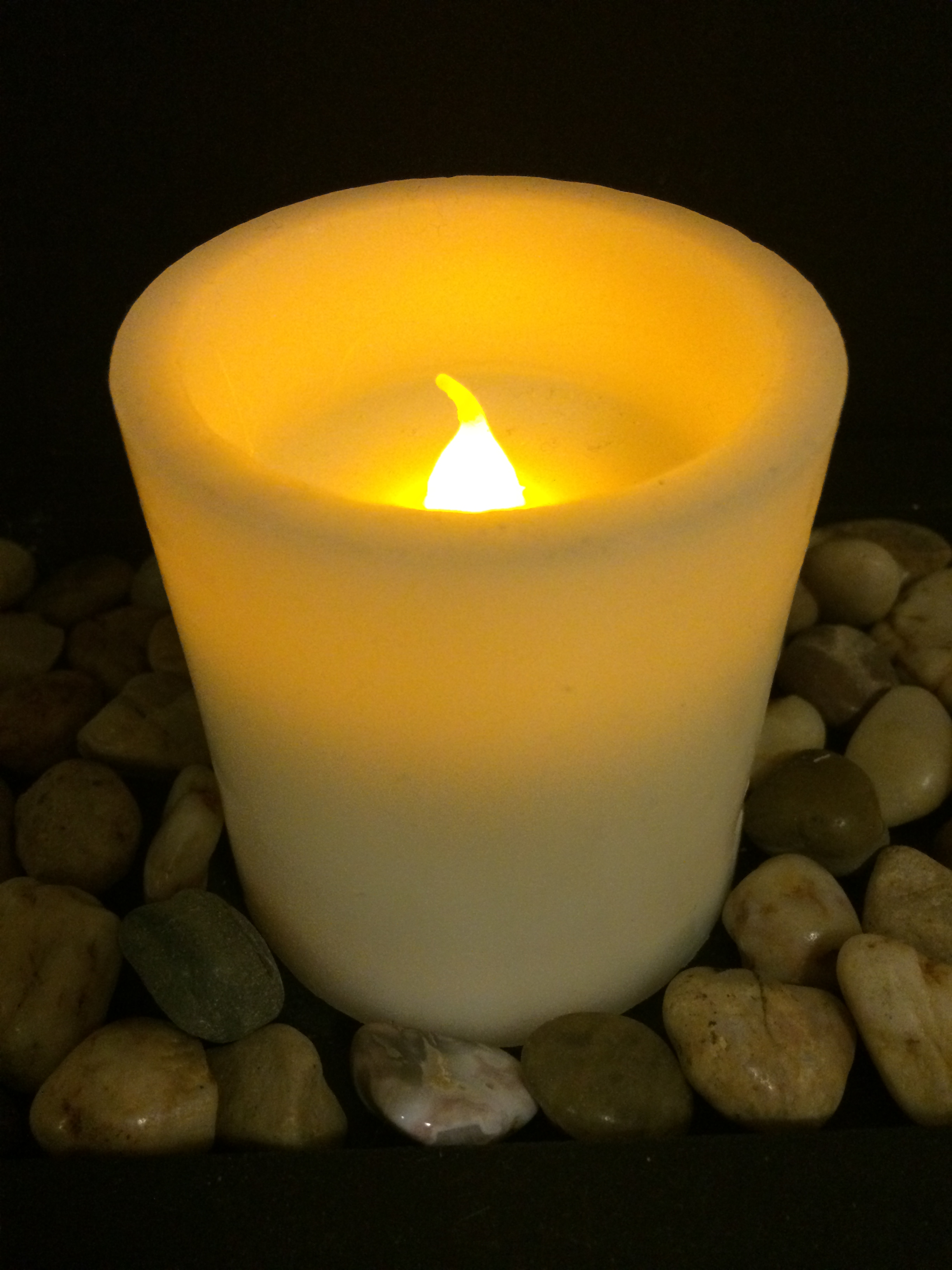
The "flame" of a flameless candle is an LED bulb inside a flame-shaped piece of plastic.

Flameless candles are an electronic alternative to traditional wick candles. They are generally utilized as aesthetic lighting devices and come in a variety of shapes, colors and sizes. A flame-effect lightbulb contains multiple small light-emitting diodes and a control circuit to flash them in a semi-regular, flickering pattern. The bulb may be sold separately with a standard Edison screw for use in ordinary fixtures, or in a self-contained housing with battery.

Flameless candles are designed to eliminate the need for an open flame, thus, reducing their potential as fire hazards.

== Appearance ==
Flameless candles display flickering light, simulating real flames.

As a decorative element, the design of a flameless candle is relatively versatile. The body or "housing" of the device is commonly cylindrical, containing a battery pack and an often flame-shaped LED lamp atop the candle. Many manufactures use LED lights with a sporadic twinkling or flickering effect to simulate the calming glow of an actual flame.

The body of a flameless candle can likewise be made of wax to enhance its resemblance to traditional candles. Since LED light does not emit as much heat as a live flame, wax-based flameless candles do not melt, but rather maintain their original shapes and sizes for future use.

== Functionality ==
Some flameless candles are scented, serving as air fresheners as well as lighting devices. Others, designed specifically for outdoor use, incorporate features including integrated insect repellent. As the sun sets, an ambient light sensor, housed in the body of the candle, triggers a small fan near a fragrance compartment. Geranial or other repellents are then released. Additional features may include remote control light switches, integrated timers and air treatment apparatus.

== Safety ==
Because flameless candles are illuminated by a small light bulb, rather than an open flame, they pose less threat as fire hazards and do not melt or lose their form over time. Nonetheless, the bulbs inside some flameless candles may heat up significantly. In a pediatric study conducted in 2013, it is suggested that flameless candles are a minor cause of battery related injuries in children. Close to 8 percent of batteries ingested by children were identified as having come from flameless candles.

== See also ==
- Neon lamp#Flicker flame
