= Unity candle =

Marital tradition

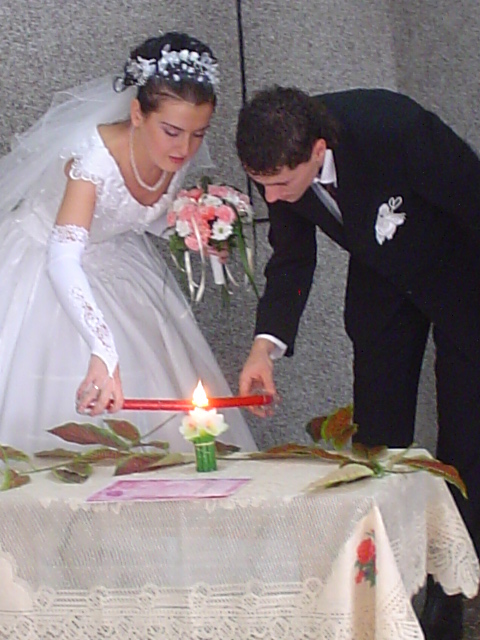
Couple lighting a unity candle

A unity candle is a candle used in a wedding ceremony to symbolize two people joining in marriage.

== History ==
The lighting of a "unity candle" is a relatively new custom in wedding ceremonies. There is no record of it in the bible or any apostolic writings. The custom first became popular in the second half of the 20th century in American Protestant weddings. The origins are unclear; however, the use of a unity candle in a 1981 episode of General Hospital may have helped to popularize the practice.

Typically, both of the mothers of the bride and groom each light a taper candles to represent the two families. There are other instances where the bride and groom light their respective families' wedding candle before lighting a center candle. In both traditions, the lighting of these candles symbolizes the two individuals coming from separate families and becoming one in marriage.

When the practice is intended to symbolize simply the joining of the bride and groom, the tapers may be blown out to indicate that the two lives have been permanently merged, or they may remain lit beside the central candle, symbolizing that the now-married partners have not lost their individuality.

== Inclusion in church weddings ==
While the use of unity candles within the marriage rite has become widespread, it is a recent tradition and not explicitly part of the churches' apostolic tradition; therefore, the practice is prohibited in some churches. It is advisable that couples and their wedding planner should always check with the pastor before including the ceremony in their order of service.

=== Catholic weddings ===
The Unity Candle Ceremony is not part of the Catholic wedding liturgy. Instead, sees the regular reception of the Holy Eucharist is emphasised as the heart of Christian Unity. The recently updated Catholic Rite of Marriage does not include any provisions for the Unity Candle Ceremony. For this reason, many parishes do not allow its inclusion in the ceremony. While the United States Conference of Catholic Bishops has not explicitly prohibited the use of the unity candle in the marriage rite, it does not encourage the practice. The Conference has noted that the policies of most dioceses do not prohibit this custom, but many suggest it be done at the reception since the Rite of Marriage already has abundant symbols of unity. The analysis of unity candles concludes by indicating that if such a ritual is permitted, the couple should light their individual candles from a paschal candle, the individual candles should not be extinguished, and the unity candle should not be placed on the altar. By following this direction, the lighted candles can then be seen as a way of emphasizing the couple's union in the sacramental and vocational nature of their marriage.

=== Anglican church weddings ===
The Candle Ceremony is not part of the Anglican wedding ceremonies, although it may be allowed at the discretion of the pastor.

==== Mixed Marriages and the Unity of Baptism ====
In the Sacred Tradition of the Catholic Church, a marriage is sacramental in nature when the couple are both baptized Christians. This fact can help to give a more Christian interpretation of the Unity Candle, especially in a mixed marriage between a Catholic and a Christian of another Tradition. It is desirable at a Catholic Wedding for Holy Communion to be distributed. However, given that Holy Communion is not encouraged at a mixed Wedding, where one of the spouses together with a large part of the congregation is not Catholic, the use of a Unity Candle might be employed as a sign of the baptismal unity of the couple. Since in the rite of baptism, the lighted Paschal Candle and a smaller candle plays an important symbolic part. In the baptism rite, the Paschal Candle is placed near the font. After the person has been baptized with water, another smaller candle is lit by a Godparent from the flame of the Paschal Candle and given to the newly baptized as a sign that they have received the "light of Christ". They are instructed to keep the "flame" they have received to "keep burning brightly" until the return of the Lord (Parousia). This call to vigilance is a reference to the discipleship nature of baptized Christians who are called to evangelize through their vocational calling. The fact that each of the couple shares the same light signifies the unitive nature of their Christian vocation. St. Paul expresses the evangelizing nature of Christian marriage in his letter to the Ephesians 5:22-33. He says "Wives, submit yourselves to your own husbands as you do to the Lord" and "Husbands, love your wives, just as Christ loved the church and gave himself up for her"

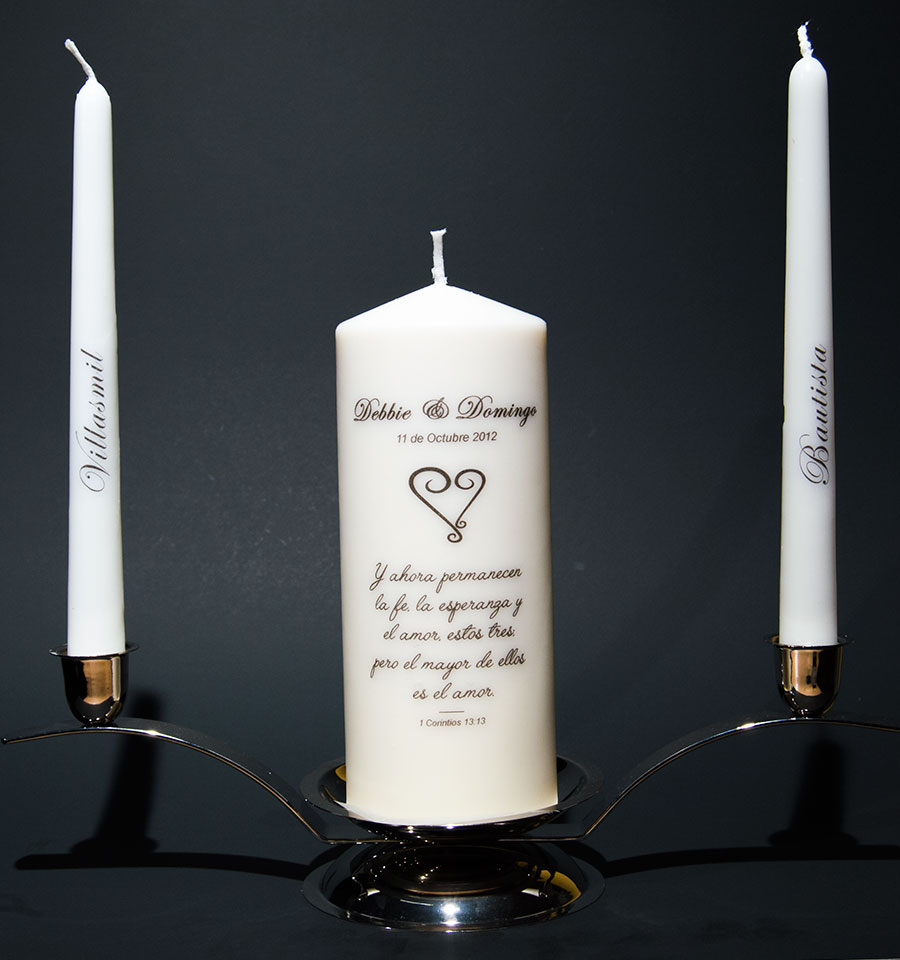
A personalized Unity Candle set
