= Coalition of Northeastern Governors =

The Coalition of Northeastern Governors (CONEG) is a non-partisan organization of seven governors of the Northeastern United States. The organization was founded in 1976 and is headquartered in Washington, D.C. The organization deals with regional issues and provides a forum for intergovernmental cooperation.

Currently, the association comprises five Democrats and two Republicans. The current chairman is Republican Phil Scott of Vermont.

== List of current northeast governors ==
Governor	State	Past	Party	Assumed office	Seat up
Ned Lamont	Connecticut	List	Dem	2019	2027
Janet Mills	Maine	List	Dem	2019	2027 (term limited)
Maura Healey	Massachusetts	List	Dem	2023	2027
Daniel McKee	Rhode Island	List	Dem	2021	2027
Kelly Ayotte	New Hampshire	List	Rep	2025	2027
Kathy Hochul	New York	List	Dem	2021	2026
Phil Scott	Vermont	List	Rep	2017	2025
