= Candle warmer =

Electric warmer that melts a candle or scented wax to release its scent

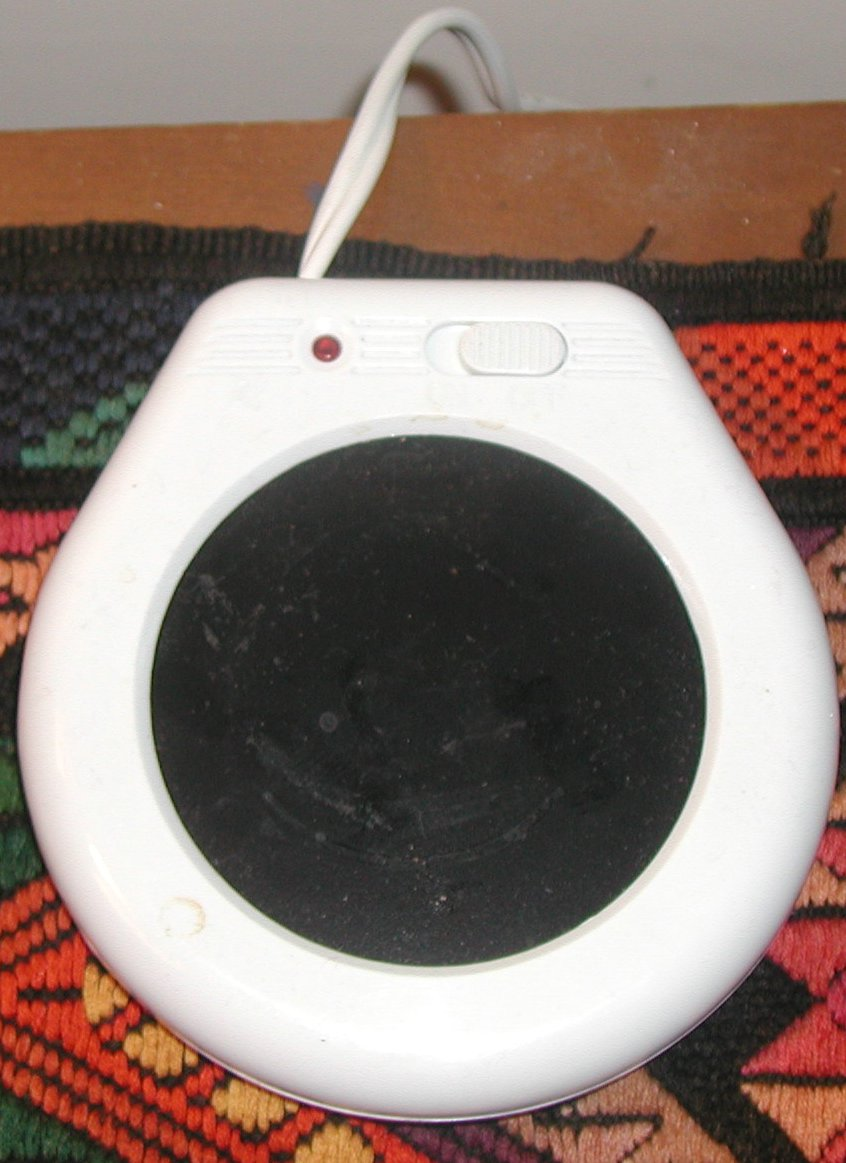
Photograph of a candle warmer

A candle warmer is an electric device that heats a candle or scented wax (such as wax melts) to release fragrance without an open flame. They typically use either a hot plate or an overhead lamp as the heat source and include a stand or tray for the candle jar or wax. Candle warmers eliminate many fire hazards associated with open-flame candles; however, a 2025 American Chemical Society study indicates that scented wax melts warmed in these devices can still degrade indoor air quality.

== History ==
Early accessories called “candle warmers” used a candle’s own flame to warm food or drink; an Art-Deco food warmer designed by Peter Mueller-Munk in 1949 is one example. Electrical candle-heating devices appeared by the early 1950s, as shown by a 1952 U.S. patent for a “cover for a candle warmer.” The modern consumer product was popularised in 2001, when Candle Warmers Etc. introduced a mug-warmer-style hot plate for jar candles after a candle-related house fire prompted a search for safer fragrance methods. In 2003, Scentsy launched a direct-sales model built around plug-in wax warmers and wickless scented wax, broadening public awareness.

== Design and technology ==
=== Heating mechanisms ===
- Plate warmers use an electric resistive element beneath a metal or ceramic plate to heat the candle from below.
- Lamp warmers position a halogen or incandescent bulb above the candle, melting the top layer of wax while providing ambient light.
- 2-in-1 models accept either a candle jar on the plate or wax melts in a detachable dish.

=== Materials and safety features ===
Warmers employ heat-resistant ceramics or metals and typically carry UL/ETL or CE certification. Modern units often add auto shut-off timers, dimmers or thermostats, and over-temperature fuses. Manufacturers warn against using certain vegetable-wax candles on high-heat plates to avoid jar rupture.

== Global usage and market ==
Industry analysts valued the candle-warmers segment at roughly US$320 million in 2023 and project it to exceed US$450 million by the early 2030s. North America accounts for ≈38 % of revenue, followed by Asia–Pacific (~25 %) and Europe (~22 %). Growth drivers include home-wellness trends and social-media exposure. Major brands are Candle Warmers Etc., Scentsy, ScentSationals/Rimports, Yankee Candle, and Bath & Body Works.

== Advantages ==
- Fire safety – no open flame drastically reduces ignition risk.
- No soot or smoke – eliminates combustion by-products.
- Even fragrance throw – melts a larger wax surface than a flame.
- Lower long-term cost – reusable device; inexpensive wax-melt refills.

== Disadvantages ==
- Reduced ambiance – lacks natural flame flicker.
- Up-front cost – US$10–50 per device.
- Faster fragrance depletion – wax loses scent sooner, leaving unscented residue.
- Indoor-air VOCs – 2025 ACS study showed wax-melt VOCs forming ultrafine particles comparable to those from burning candles.

== Safety considerations ==
- Place warmers on stable, heat-resistant surfaces away from combustibles.
- Use UL/ETL-certified devices and follow manufacturer instructions.
- Avoid overheating vegetable-wax candles, which can pressurise and crack jars.

=== Indoor air quality ===
While warmers remove soot and smoke, they do not eliminate all emissions. A Purdue University study in Environmental Science & Technology Letters found that warming terpene-rich wax melts generated secondary organic aerosol nanoparticles. Researchers concluded that “flame-free does not mean pollution-free.”

== Comparison with traditional candles ==
| Aspect | Candle warmer | Burning candle |
|---|---|---|
| Fire risk | Low (no flame) | High (open flame) |
| Soot/smoke | None | Present |
| Fragrance throw | Even, strong | Localised melt pool |
| Wax use | Fragrance only | Wax + fragrance consumed |
| Ambiance | Lamp glow | Natural flicker |
| Up-front cost | Device (US$10–50) | Negligible |
| Electricity | 15–40 W while on | None |

== Related products ==
- Wax melts and tart warmers
- Electric diffusers and oil warmers
- LED flameless candles
- Traditional pot-pourri burners
- Historic candle stoves
