= Ceremonial use of lights =

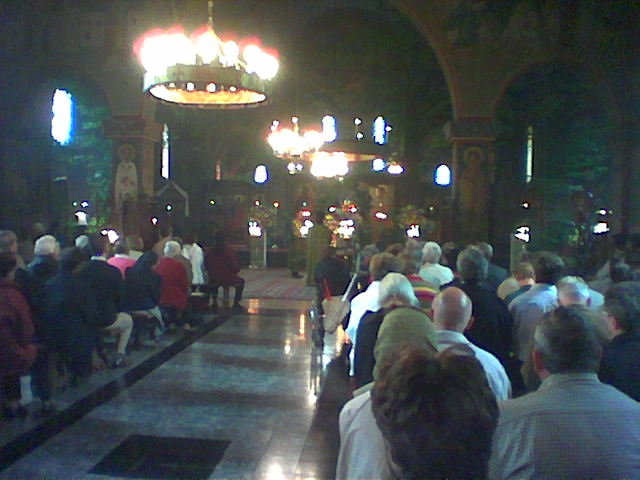
Religious services often make use of a combination of light and darkness.

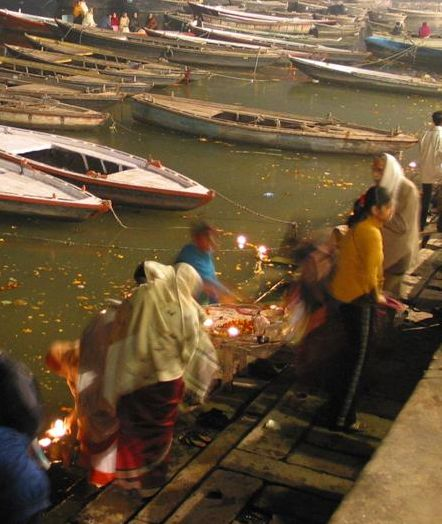
Hindus putting lit oil lamps on the river Ganges.

The ceremonial use of lights occurs in liturgies of various Christian Churches, as well as in Jewish, Zoroastrian, and Hindu rites and customs.

Fire is used as an object of worship in many religions. Fire-worship still has its place in at least two of the great religions of the world. The Zoroastrians revere fire as the visible expression of Ahura Mazda, the eternal principle of light and righteousness; the Hindus worship it as divine and omniscient. One of the most popular festivals of Hinduism, Diwali (from the Sanskrit dīpāwali meaning "row or series of lights") symbolizes the spiritual "victory of light over darkness, good over evil, and knowledge over ignorance".

According to the Talmud and Kabbalah, in the Holy of Holies of the Tabernacle, there was a cloud of light (shekinah), and before it stood the candlestick with six branches, on each of which and on the central stem was a lamp eternally burning; while in the forecourt was an altar on which the sacred fire was never allowed to go out. Similarly the Jewish synagogues have each their eternal lamp.

== Ancient Greece and Rome ==
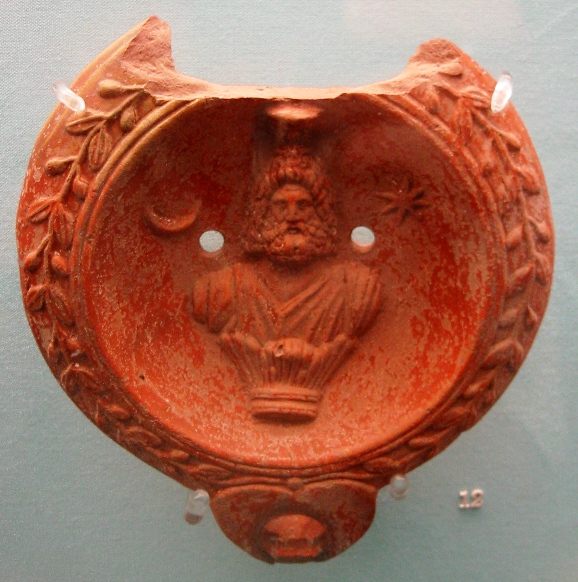
Terracotta oil lamp representing Serapis (British Museum).

The Greeks and Romans, too, had their sacred fire and their ceremonial lights. In Greece the Lampadedromia or Lampadephoria (torch-race) had its origin in Greek ceremonies, connected with the relighting of the sacred fire. Pausanias mentions the golden lamp made by Callimachus which burned night and day in the sanctuary of Athena Polias on the Acropolis, and tells of a statue of Hermes Agoraios, in the market-place of Pharae in Achaea, before which lamps were lighted. Among the Romans lighted candles and lamps formed part of the cult of the domestic tutelary deities; on all festivals doors were garlanded and lamps lighted. In the Cult of Isis lamps were lighted by day. In the ordinary temples were candelabra, e.g. that in the temple of Apollo Palatinus at Rome, originally taken by Alexander from Thebes, which was in the form of a tree from the branches of which lights hung like fruit. The lamps in the pagan temples were not symbolical, but votive offerings to the gods. Torches and lamps were also carried in religious processions.

=== Lamps for the dead ===
The pagan custom of burying lamps with the dead was to provide the dead with the means of obtaining light in the next world; the lamps were for the most part unlighted. It was of Asiatic origin, traces of it having been observed in Phoenicia and in the Punic colonies, but not in Egypt or Greece. In Europe it was confined to the countries under the domination of Rome.

== Christianity ==
=== Early Christian uses ===
In Christianity, from the very first, fire and light are conceived as symbols, if not as visible manifestations, of the divine nature and the divine presence. Christ is the true Light, and at his transfiguration the fashion Christian of his countenance was altered, and his raiment was white and glistering; when the Holy Ghost descended upon the apostles, there appeared unto them cloven tongues of fire, and it sat upon each of them; at the conversion of St Paul there shined round him a great light from heaven; while the glorified Christ is represented as standing in the midst of seven candlesticks ... his head and hairs white like wool, as white as snow; and his eyes as a flame of fire. Christians are children of Light at perpetual war with the powers of darkness. Light represents the purifying presence of God.

There is no evidence of any ceremonial use of lights in Christian worship during its first two centuries. It is recorded, indeed, that on the occasion of St. Paul's preaching at Alexandria in Troas there were many lights in the upper chamber; but this was at night. And the most that can be hazarded is that a specially large number were lighted as a festive illumination, as in modern Church festivals. As to a purely ceremonial use, such early evidence as exists is all the other way. A single sentence of Tertullian sufficiently illuminates Christian practice during the 2nd century. On days of rejoicing, he says, we do not shade our door-posts with laurels nor encroach upon the day-light with lamp laurels (die lacto non laurels pastes obumbramus nec lucernis diem infringimus). Lactantius, writing early in the 4th century, is even more sarcastic in his references to the heathen practice. They kindle lights, he says, as though to one who is in darkness. Can he be thought sane who offers the light of lamps and candles to the Author and Giver of all light? . This is primarily an attack on votive lights, and does not necessarily exclude their ceremonial use in other ways. There is, indeed, evidence that they were so used before Lactantius wrote. The 34th canon of the Synod of Elvira (305), which was contemporary with him, forbade candles to be lighted in cemeteries during the daytime, which points to an established custom as well as to an objection to it; and in the Roman catacombs lamps have been found of the 2nd and 3rd centuries which seem to have been ceremonial or symbolical. Again, according to the Acts of St Cyprian (died 258), his body was borne to the grave praelucentibus cereis, and Prudentius, in his hymn on the 2nd and martyrdom of St Lawrence, says that in the time of St Laurentius, i.e. the middle of the 3rd century, candles stood in the churches of Rome on golden candelabra. The gift, mentioned by Anastasius, made by Constantine to the Vatican basilica, of a pharum of gold, garnished with 500 dolphins each holding a lamp, to burn before St Peters tomb, points also to a custom well established before Christianity became the state religion.

Whatever previous custom may have been and for the earliest ages it is difficult to determine absolutely because the Christians held their services at night. By the close of the 4th century the ceremonial use of lights had become firmly and universally established in the Church. This is clear, to pass by much other evidence, from the controversy of St Jerome with Vigilantius.

Vigilantius, a presbyter of Barcelona, still occupied the position of Tertullian and Lactantius in this matter. We see, he wrote, a rite peculiar to the pagans introduced into the churches on pretext of religion, and, while the sun is still shining, a mass of wax tapers lighted. ... A great honor to the blessed martyrs, whom they think to illustrate with contemptible little candles (de pilissimis cereolis). Jerome, the most influential theologian of the day, took up the cudgels against Vigilantius, who, in spite of his fatherly admonition, had dared again to open his foul mouth and send forth a filthy stink against the relics of the holy martyrs. If candles are lit before their tombs, are these the ensigns of idolatry? In his treatise contra Vigilantium he answers the question with much common sense. There can be no harm if ignorant and simple people or religious women, light candles in honor of the martyrs. We are not born, but reborn, Christians, and that which when done for idols was detestable is acceptable when done for the martyrs. As in the case of the woman with the precious box of ointment, it is not the gift that merits reward, but the faith that inspires it. As for lights in the churches, he adds that in all the churches of the East, whenever the gospel is to be read, lights are lit, though the sun be rising (jam sole rutilante), not in order to disperse the darkness, but as a visible sign of gladness (ad signum laetitiae demonstrandum). Taken in connection with a statement which almost immediately precedes this Cereos autem non clara luce accendimus, sicut frustra calumniaris: sed ut noctis tenebras hoc solatio temperemus , this seems to point to the fact that the ritual use of lights in the church services, so far as already established, arose from the same conservative habit as determined the development of liturgical vestments, i.e. the lights which had been necessary at the nocturnal meetings were retained, after the hours of service had been altered, and invested with a symbolical meaning.

Already they were used at most of the conspicuous functions of the Church. Paulinus, bishop of Nola (died 431), describes the altar at the eucharist as crowned with crowded lights, and even mentions the eternal lamp. For their use at baptisms we have, among much other evidence, that of Zeno of Verona for the West, and that of Gregory of Nazianzus for the East. Their use at funerals is illustrated by Eusebius's description of the burial of Constantine, and Jerome's account of that of Saint Paula. At ordinations they were used, as is shown by the 6th canon of the Council of Carthage (398), which decrees that the acolyte is to hand to the newly ordained deacon ceroferarium cum cereo. This symbolism was not pagan, i.e. the lamps were not placed in the graves as part of the furniture of the dead; in the Catacombs they are found only in the niches of the galleries and the arcosolia, nor can they have been votive in the sense popularized later. Clara coronantur densis altaria lychnis. Continuum scyphus est argenteus aptus ad usum. Sal, ignis et oleum. Cum alii Pontifices lampadas cereosque proferrent, alii choras psallentium ducerent..

=== Middle Ages ===
As to the blessing of candles, according to the Liber pontificalis Pope Zosimus in 417 ordered these to be blessed, and the Gallican and Mozarabic rituals also provided for this ceremony. The Feast of the Purification of the Virgin, known as Candlemas, because on this day the candles for the whole year are blessed, was established according to some authorities by Pope Gelasius I about 492. As to the question of altar lights, however, it must be borne in mind that these were not placed upon the altar, or on a retable behind it, until the 12th century. These were originally the candles carried by the deacons, according to the Ordo Romanus (i. 8; ii. 5; iii. 7) seven in number, which were set down, either on the steps of the altar, or, later, behind it. In certain of the Eastern Churches to this day, there are no lights on the high altar; the lighted candles stand on a small altar beside it, and at various parts of the service are carried by the lectors or acolytes before the officiating priest or deacon. The crowd of lights described by Paulinus as crowning the altar were either grouped round it or suspended in front of it; they are represented by the sanctuary lamps of the Latin Church and by the crown of lights suspended in front of the altar in the Greek.

To trace the gradual elaboration of the symbolism and use of ceremonial lights in the Church, until its full development and systematization in the Middle Ages, would be impossible here. It must suffice to note a few stages in development of the process. The burning of lights before the tombs of martyrs led naturally to their being burned also before relics and lastly before images and pictures. This latter practice, hotly denounced as idolatry during the iconoclastic controversy, was finally established as orthodox by the Second General Council of Nicaea (787), which restored the use of images. A later development, however, by which certain lights themselves came to be regarded as objects of worship and to have other lights burned before them, was condemned as idolatrous by the Synod of Noyon in 1344. The passion for symbolism extracted ever new meanings out of the candles and their use. Early in the 6th century Magnus Felix Ennodius, bishop of Pavia, pointed out the threefold elements of a wax candle (Opusc. ix. and x.), each of which would make it an offering acceptable to God; the rush-wick is the product of pure water, the wax is the offspring of virgin, bees in the flame is sent from heaven.12 Clearly, wax was a symbol of the Blessed Virgin and the holy humanity of Christ. The later Middle Ages developed the idea. Durandus, in his Rationale, interprets the wax as the body of Christ, the wick as his soul, the flame as his divine nature; and the consuming candle as symbolizing his passion and death.

This may be the Paschal Candle only. In some codices the text runs: Per parochias concessit licentiam benedicendi Cereum Paschalem. In the three variants of the notice of Zosimus given in Duchesnes edition of the Liber pontificalis (I~86I892) the word cera is, however, alone used. Nor does the text imply that he gave to the suburbicarian churches a privilege hitherto exercised by the metropolitan church. The passage runs: Hic constituit ut diaconi leva tecta haberent de palleis linostimis per parrochias et ut cera benedicatur, &c. "Per parrochias" here obviously refers to the headgear of the deacons, not to the candles.

See also the Peregrinoiio Sylviae (386), 86, &c., for the use of lights at Jerusalem, and Isidore of Seville for the usage in the West. That even in the 7th century the blessing of candles was by no means universal is proved by the 9th canon of the Council of Toledo (671):De benedicendo cereo et lucerna in privilegiis Paschae. This canon states that candles and lamps are not blessed in some churches, and that inquiries have been made why we do it. In reply, the council decides that it should be done to celebrate the mystery of Christ's resurrection. See Isidore of Seville, Conc., in Migne, Pat, tat. lxxxiv. 369.

=== Eastern Christian usage ===
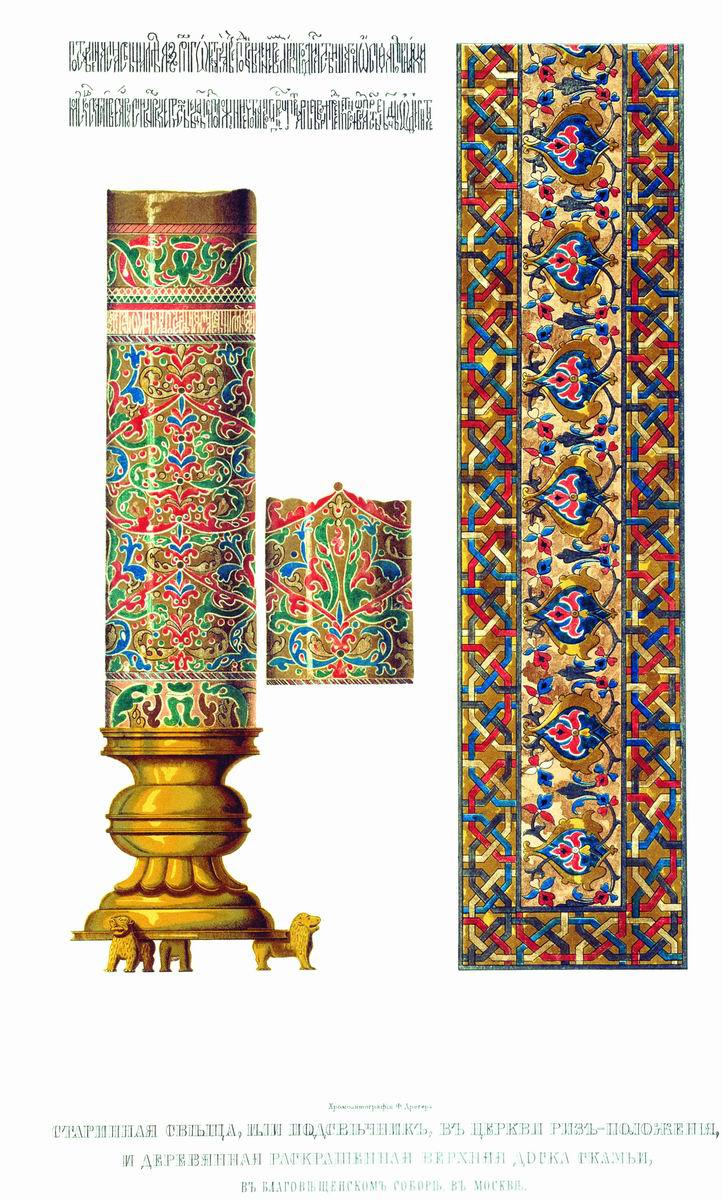
Russian Orthodox Church candle

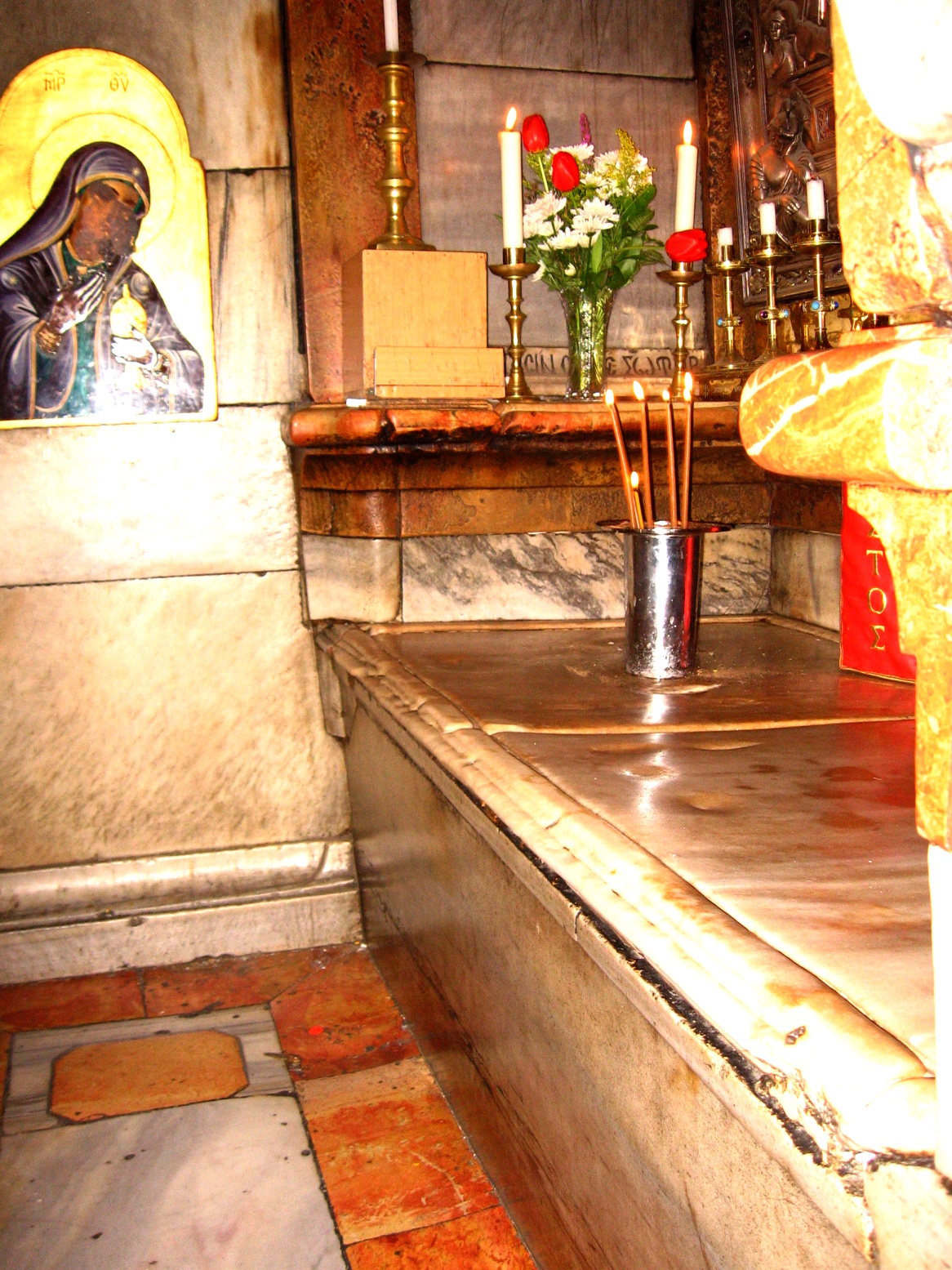
Tomb of Jesus, inside the Edicule. Church of the Holy Sepulchre, Jerusalem. This is where the Holy Fire manifests itself.

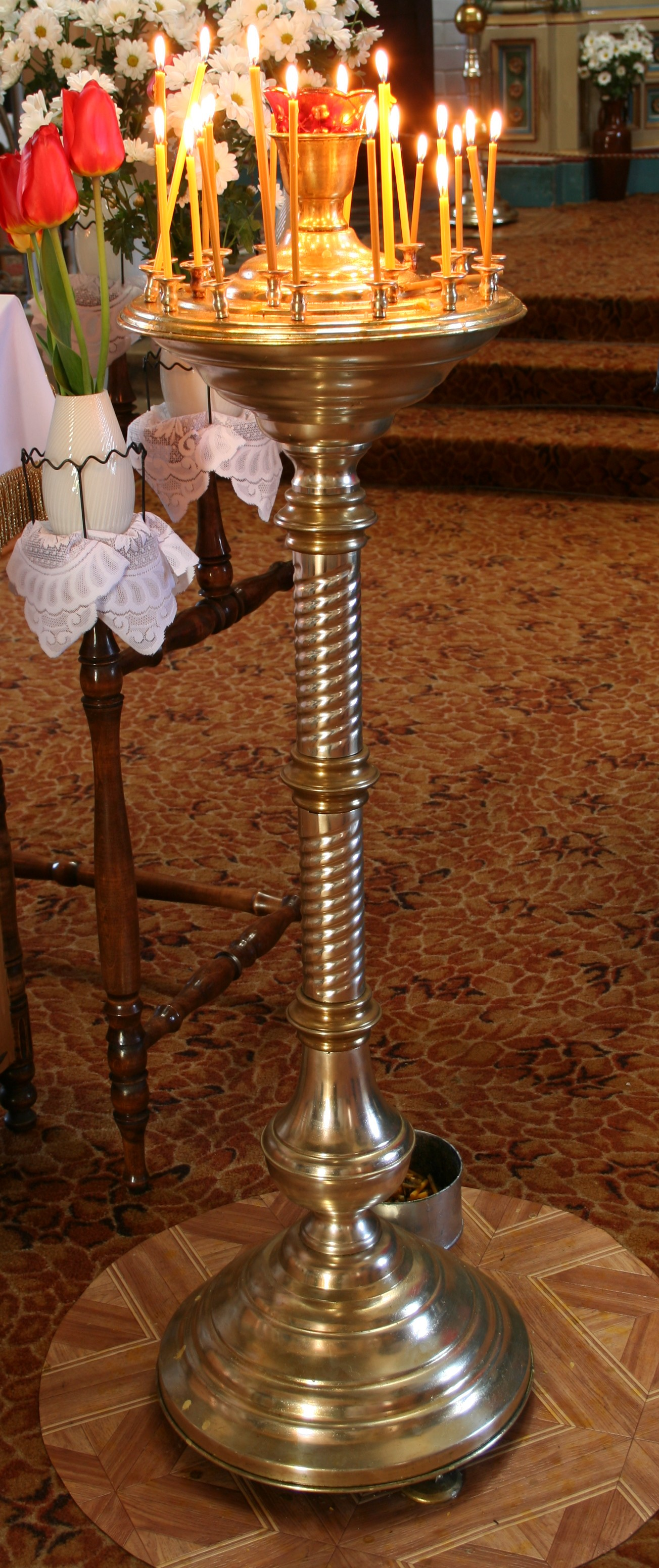
Candlestand in an Eastern Orthodox church.

In the Eastern Orthodox Church and those Eastern Catholic Churches which follow the Byzantine Rite, there is a large amount of ceremonial use of light.

The most important usage is the reception of the Holy Fire at the Church of the Holy Sepulchre in Jerusalem on the afternoon of Holy Saturday. This flame is often taken by the faithful to locations all over the world.

==== The temple ====
When a new temple (church building) is consecrated the bishop kindles a flame in the sanctuary which traditionally should burn perpetually from that time forward. This sanctuary lamp is usually an oil lamp located either on or above the Holy Table (altar). In addition, in the Eastern Orthodox Church there must be candles on the Holy Table during the celebration of the Divine Liturgy. In some places this takes the form of a pair of white candles, in others, it may be a pair of five-branch candlesticks. There is also traditionally a seven-branch candlestick on or behind the Holy Table, recalling the one mandated in the Old Testament Tabernacle and the Temple in Jerusalem.

Around the temple, there are a number of oil lamps burning in front of the icons, especially on the iconostasis. Additionally, the faithful will offer beeswax candles in candle stands in front of important icons. The faithful offer candles as they pray for both the living and the departed. It is customary during funerals and memorial services for everyone to stand holding lit candles. Often everyone will either extinguish their candles or put them in a candle stand at a certain point near the end of the memorial service to indicate that at some point, everyone will have to surrender their soul to God.

==== Special moments ====
The reading from the Gospel Book must always be accompanied by lighted candles, as a sign that Christ is the Light which enlightens all (John 1:4–5). When the priest and deacon cense the temple, the deacon will walk with a lighted candle. During processions, and in some places during the liturgical entrances, either candles or lanterns are carried by altar servers. On certain feast days, the clergy, and sometimes all of the faithful, will stand holding candles for certain solemn moments during the service. This is especially so during Holy Week during the reading of the 12 Passion Gospels on Great Friday, and the Lamentations around the epitaphios on Great Saturday.

Certain moments during the All Night Vigil will be accentuated by the lighting or extinguishing of lamps or candles. The Polyeleos is an important moment in the service when all of the lamps and candles in the church should be illuminated.

Whenever the bishop celebrates the divine services, he will bless with a pair of candlesticks known as dikirion and trikirion, holding two and three candles, respectively.

==== In the home ====
The faithful will often keep a lamp burning perpetually in their icon corner. In the Russian Orthodox Church, it is customary to try to preserve the flame from the service of the 12 Passion Gospels and bring it home to bless their house: there is a custom of using the flame from this candle to mark a cross on the lintel of one's doorway before entering after the service, and of then using the flame to re-kindle the lamp in the icon corner.

==== Paschal Vigil and Bright Week ====
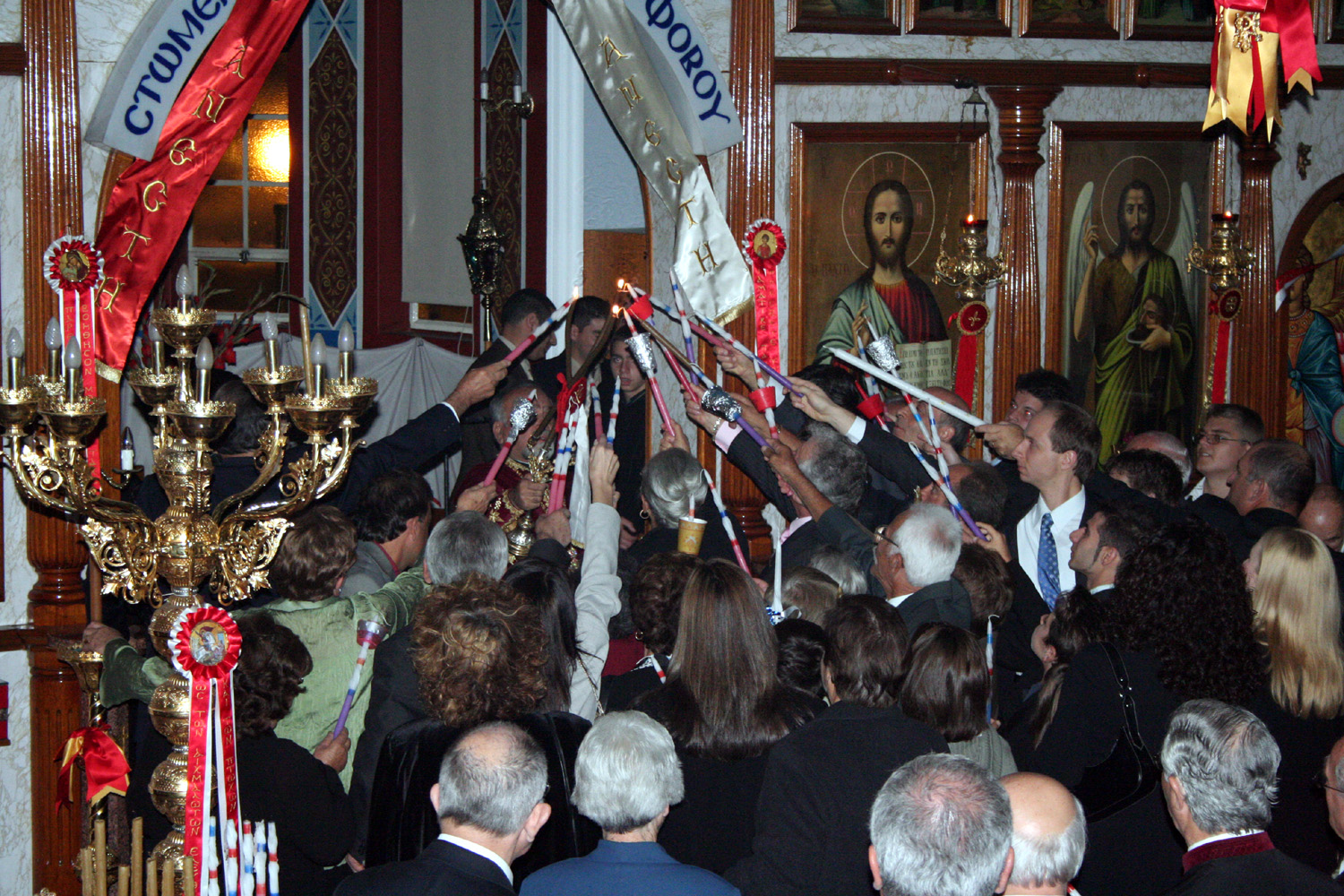
The congregation lighting their candles from the new flame which the priest has retrieved from the altar (St. George Greek Orthodox Church, in Adelaide, Australia).

During the Paschal Vigil, after the Midnight Office, all of the candles and lamps in the temple are extinguished, with the exception of the sanctuary lamp behind the iconostasis, and all wait in silence and darkness. (In Orthodox churches, when possible, the Holy Fire arrives from the Holy Sepulchre during Holy Saturday afternoon and it is used to light anew the flame in the sanctuary lamp.) At the stroke of midnight, the priest censes around the Holy Table, and lights his candle from the sanctuary lamp. Then the Holy Doors are opened and all the people light their candles from the priest's candle. Then, all the clergy and the people exit the church and go in procession three times around it holding lighted candles and singing a hymn of the resurrection.

During the Paschal Vigil, and throughout Bright Week, the priest will hold a special paschal candle—in the Greek tradition a single candle, in the Slavic tradition a triple candlestick—at the beginning of the service, whenever he senses, and at other special moments during the service. In the Slavic tradition, the deacon also carries a special paschal candle which he holds at the beginning, whenever he senses, and whenever he chants an ektenia (litany).

=== Oriental Orthodox ===
In the Ethiopian Orthodox Church, it is customary to light bonfires on the Feast of Timkat (Epiphany).

=== Roman Catholic usage in the early 20th century ===
In the Latin Church or Roman Catholic Church, the use of ceremonial lights falls under three heads. (1) They may be symbolical of the light of Gods presence, of Christ as Light, or of the children of Light in conflict with Catholic the powers of darkness; they may even be no more than expressions of joy on the occasion of great festivals. (2) They may be votive, i.e. offered as an act of worship (latria) to God. (3) They are, in virtue of their benediction by the Church, sacramental id, i.e. efficacious for the good of men's souls and bodies, and for the confusion of the powers of darkness. With one or more of these implications, they are employed in all the public functions of the Church. At the consecration of a church twelve lights are placed around the walls at the twelve spots. Dedication where these are anointed by the bishop with holy oil, of a and on every anniversary these are relighted; at the church, dedication of an altar tapers are lighted and censed at each place where the table is anointed (Pontificale Rom. p. ii. De ecci. dedicat. seu consecrat.).

==== Mass ====
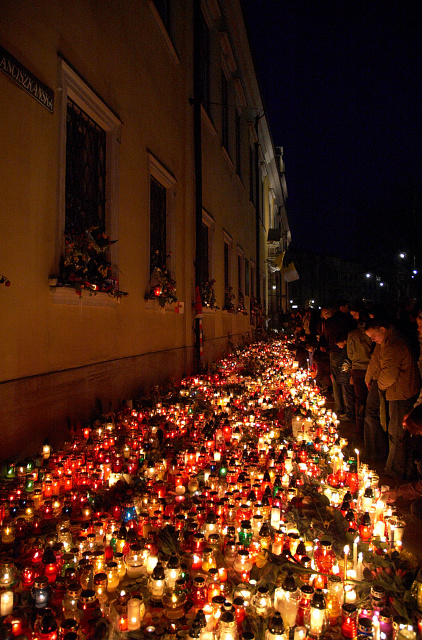
Candles burning in Kraków after the death of Pope John Paul II.

At every liturgical service, and especially at Mass and at choir services, there must be at least two lighted tapers on the altar, as symbols of the presence at Mass of God and tributes of adoration. For the Mass the rule is that there are six lights at High Mass, four at missa cantata, and two at private masses. At a Pontifical High Mass (i.e. when the bishop celebrates) the lights are seven, because seven golden candlesticks surround the risen Saviour, the chief bishop of the Church (see Rev. i. 12). At most pontifical functions, moreover, the bishop as the representative of Christ is preceded by an acolyte with a burning candle on a candlestick or bugia. The Ceremoniale Episcoporum (i. 12) further orders that a burning lamp is to hang at all times before each altar, three in front of the high altar, and five before the reserved Sacrament, as symbols of the eternal Presence. In practice, however, it is usual to have only one Altar lamp lighted before the tabernacle in which the Host is reserved. The special symbol of the real presence of Christ is the Sanctus candle, which is lighted at the moment of consecration and kept burning until the communion. The same symbolism is intended by the lighted tapers which must accompany the Host whenever it is carried in procession, or to the sick and dying.

As symbols of light and joy, a candle is held on each side of the deacon when reading the Gospel at Mass; and the same symbolism underlies the multiplication of lights on festivals, their number varying with the importance of the occasion. As to the number of these latter no rule is laid down. They differ from liturgical lights in that, whereas these must be tapers of pure beeswax or lamps fed with pure olive oil (except by special dispensation under Certain circumstances), those used merely to add splendour to the celebration may be of any material; the only exception being, that in the decoration of the altar, gas-lights are forbidden.

In general, the ceremonial use of lights in the Roman Catholic Church is conceived as a dramatic representation in fire of the life of Christ and of the whole scheme of salvation. On Easter Eve the new fire, symbol of the light of the newly risen Christ, is produced, and from this are kindled all the lights used throughout the Christian year until, in the gathering darkness (tenebrae) of the Passion, they are gradually extinguished. This quenching of the light of the world is symbolized at the service of Tenebrae in Holy Week by the placing on a stand before the altar of thirteen lighted tapers arranged pyramidally, the rest of the church being in darkness. The penitential psalms are sung, and at the end of each a candle is extinguished. When only the central one is left it is taken down and carried behind the altar, thus symbolizing the nocturnal darkness, so our hearts are illumined by invisible fire, &c. (Missale Rom.). In the form for the blessing of candles extra diem Purificationis B. Mariae Virg. the virtue of the consecrated candles in discomfiting demons is specially brought out: that in whatever places they may be lighted, or placed, the princes of darkness may depart, and tremble, and may fly terror-stricken with all their ministers from those habitations, nor presume further to disquiet and molest those who serve thee, Almighty God (Rituale Rom.)

Altar candlesticks consist of five parts: the foot, stem, knob in the centre, bowl to catch the drippings, and pricket (a sharp point on which the candle is fixed). It is permissible to use a long tube, pointed to imitate a candle, in which a small taper is forced to the top by a spring (Cong. Rit., tIth May I&78).

==== Easter ====
On Easter Eve new fire is made with a flint and steel, and blessed; from this three candles are lighted, the lumen Christi, and from these again the Paschal Candle. This is the symbol of the risen and victorious Christ, and burns at every solemn service until Ascension Day, when it is extinguished and removed after the reading of the Gospel at High Mass. This, of course, symbolizes the Ascension; but meanwhile the other lamps in the church have received their light from the Paschal Candle, and so symbolize throughout the year the continued presence of the light of Christ.

==== Baptism ====
At the consecration of the baptismal water the burning Paschal Candle is dipped into the font so that the power of the Holy Ghost may descend into it and make it an effective instrument of regeneration. This is the symbol of baptism as rebirth as children of Light. Lighted tapers are also placed in the hands of the newly baptized, or of their god-parents, with the admonition to preserve their baptism inviolate, so that they may go to meet the Lord when he comes to the wedding. Thus, too, as children of Light, candidates for ordination and novices about to take the vows carry lights. when they come before the bishop; and the same idea 17, CEo. underlies the custom of carrying lights at weddings, at the first communion, and by priests going to their first mass, though none of these are liturgically prescribed. Finally, lights are placed around the bodies of the dead and carried beside them to the grave, partly as symbols that they still live in the light of Christ, partly to frighten away the powers of darkness.

==== Funeral ====
During the funeral service, the Paschal Candle is placed, burning, near the coffin, as a reminder of the deceased's baptismal vows and hope of eternal life and salvation brought about by the death and resurrection of Jesus, and of faith in the resurrection of the dead.

==== Excommunication ====
Conversely, the extinction of lights is part of the ceremony of excommunication (Pontificale Rom. pars iii.). Regino, abbot of Prum, describes the ceremony as it was carried out in his day, when its terrors were yet unabated (De eccles. disciplina, Excom ii. 409). Twelve priests should stand about the bishop, holding in their hands lighted torches, which at the conclusion of the anathema or excommunication they should cast down and trample under foot. When the excommunication is removed, the symbol of reconciliation is the handing to the penitent of a burning taper.

=== Lutheran usage ===
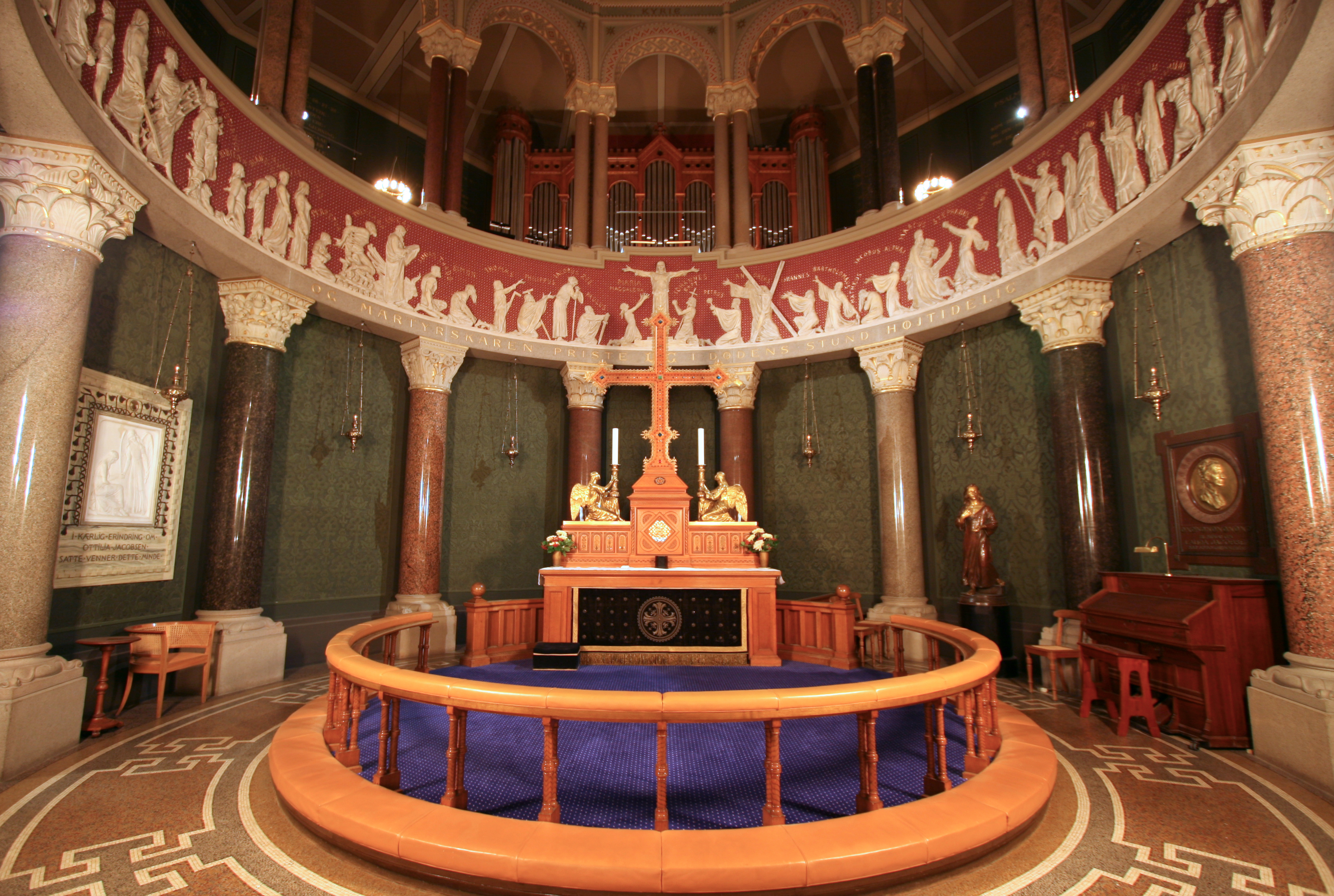
Altar at the Lutheran Jesus Church in Valby, Copenhagen.

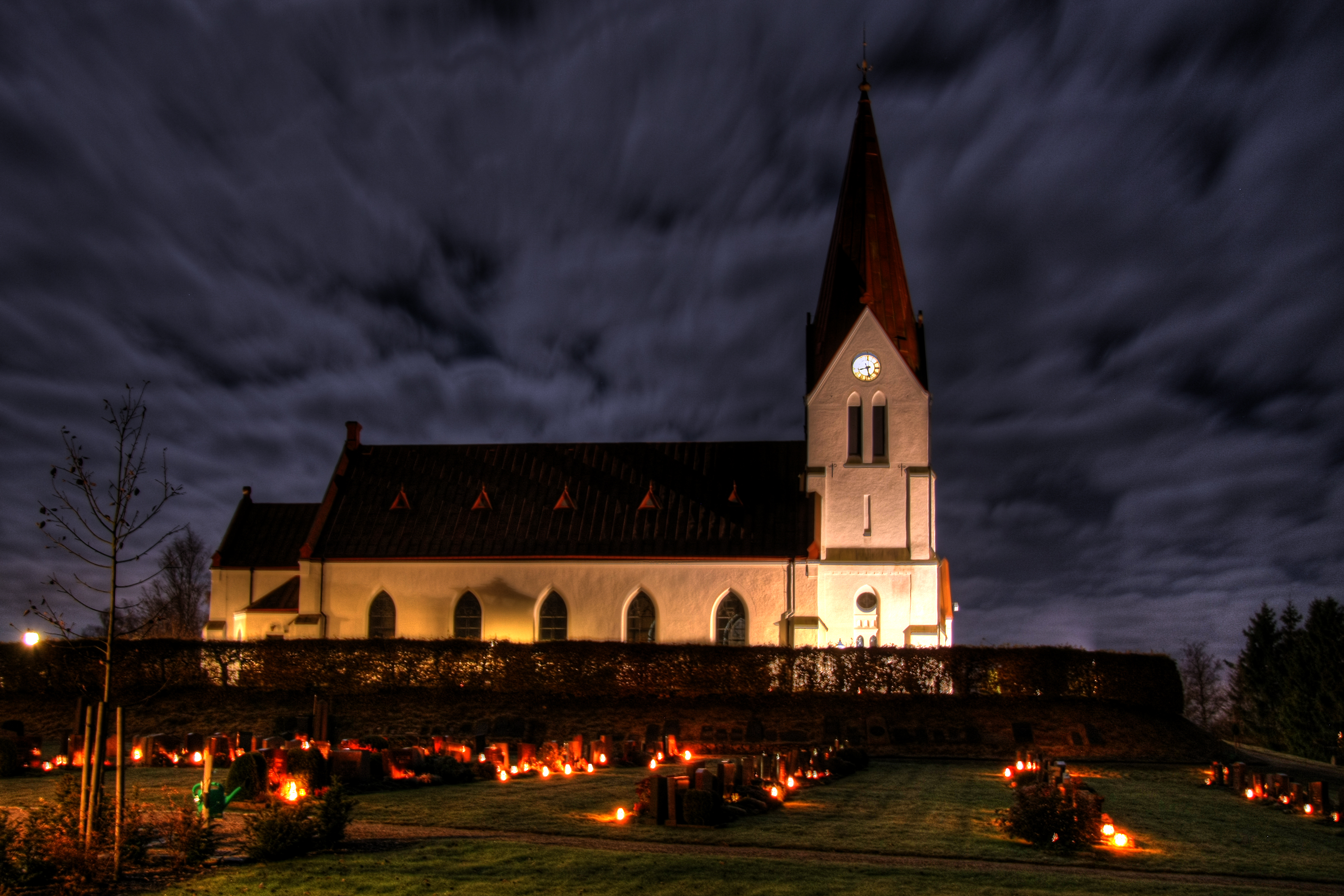
A Christian cemetery outside an Evangelical Lutheran church (Church of Sweden) in Röke, Sweden on the Feast of All Hallows. Flowers and lighted candles are placed by relatives on the graves of their deceased loved ones.

In the Lutheran Churches they were retained, and in Evangelical Germany have even survived most of the other medieval rites and ceremonies (e.g. the use of vestments) which were not abolished at the Reformation itself. The custom of placing lighted candles around the bodies of the dead is still practised by Lutherans.

=== Anglican usage ===
In the Church of England the practice has been less consistent. The first Book of Common Prayer directed two lights to be placed on the altar. This direction was omitted in the second Prayer-book; but the Ornaments Rubric of Queen Elizabeth's Prayer-book again made them obligatory. The question of how far this did so is a much-disputed one and is connected with the whole problem of the meaning and scope of the rubric. Uncertainty reigns with regard to the actual usage of the Church of England from the Reformation onwards. Lighted candles certainly continued to burn in Queen Elizabeth's chapel, to the scandal of Protestant zealots. They also seem to have been retained in certain cathedral and collegiate churches. There is, however, no mention of ceremonial candles in the detailed account of the services of the Church of England given by William Harrison (Description of England, 1570). They seem never to have been illegal under the Acts of Uniformity. The use of wax lights and tapers formed one of the indictments brought by Peter Smart, a Puritan prebendary of Durham, against Dr. Burgoyne, John Cosin and others for setting up superstitious ceremonies in the cathedral contrary to the Act of Uniformity. The indictments were dismissed in 1628 by Sir James Whitelocke, chief justice of Chester and a judge of the Kings Bench, and in 1629 by Sir Henry Yelverton, a judge of Common Pleas and himself a strong Puritan.

The use of ceremonial lights was among the indictments in the impeachment of Laud and other bishops by the House of Commons, but these were not based on the Act of Uniformity. From the Restoration onwards the use of ceremonial lights, though far from universal, was usual again in cathedrals and collegiate churches.

It was not, however, until the Oxford Movement of the 19th century that their use was widely extended in parish churches. The growing custom met with some opposition; the law was appealed to, and in 1872 the Privy Council declared altar lights to be illegal (Martin v. Mackonochie). This judgment, founded as was afterwards admitted on insufficient knowledge, produced no effect. In the absence of any authoritative negative pronouncement, churches returned to practically the whole ceremonial use of lights as practised in the Roman Catholic Church.

The matter was again raised in the case of Read and others v. the Bishop of Lincoln, one of the counts of the indictment being that the bishop had, during the celebration of Holy Communion, allowed two candles to be alight on a shelf or retable behind the communion table when they were not necessary for giving light. The Archbishop of Canterbury, in whose court the case was heard (1889), decided that the mere presence of two candles on the table, burning during the service but lit before it began, was lawful under the first Prayer-Book of Edward VI. and had never been made unlawful. On the case being appealed to the Privy Council, this particular indictment was dismissed on the ground that the vicar, not the bishop, was responsible for the presence of the lights.

The custom of placing lighted candles around the bodies of the dead, especially when lying in state, has never wholly died out in the Anglican communion. In the 18th century, moreover, it was still customary in England to accompany a funeral with lighted tapers. A contemporary illustration shows a funeral cortege preceded and accompanied by boys, each carrying four lighted candles in a branched candlestick. The usage in this respect in Anglo-Catholic churches is a revival of pre-Reformation ceremonial as is found in the Roman Catholic Church.

=== Reformed usage ===
As a result of the Reformation, the use of ceremonial lights was either greatly modified, or totally abolished in the Reformed Churches. Candles and lamps were only used to provide necessary illumination. Since the nineteenth century, many churches in the Reformed tradition, especially in the United States, commonly use two or more candles on the Communion Table, influenced by the liturgical movement. The use of the Advent wreath has gained near universal acceptance, even in churches traditionally hostile to ceremonial lights, such as the Church of Scotland.

== Usage in Hinduism ==
In almost all Hindu homes, lamps are lit daily, sometimes before an altar. In some houses, oil lamps or candles are lit at dawn, in some houses they are lit at both dawn and dusk, and in a few, lamps are maintained continuously.

A diya, or clay lamp, is frequently used in Hindu celebrations and forms an integral part of many social rites. It is a strong symbol of enlightenment, hope, and prosperity. Diwali is the festival of lights celebrated by followers of dharmic religions.

In its traditional and simplest form, the diya is made from baked clay or terracotta and holds oil or ghee that is lit via a cotton wick.

Traditional diyas have now evolved into a form wherein waxes are used as replacements for oils.

== Usage in Sikhism ==
Lamps are lit in Sikhism on Diwali, the festival of light, as well as being lit everyday by followers of Dharmic religions.

== Buddhism ==
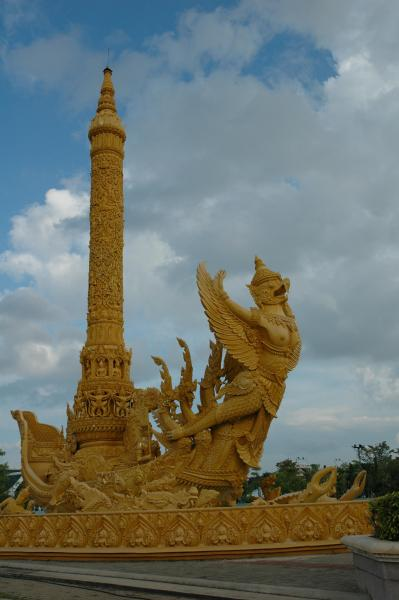
Giant sculpture of a candle, similar smaller candles are paraded in the Ubon Ratchathani Candle Festival

Candles are a traditional part of Buddhist ritual observances. Along with incense and flowers, candles (or some other type of light source, such as butter lamps) are placed before Buddhist shrines or images of the Buddha as a show of respect. They may also be accompanied by offerings of food and drink. The light of the candles is described as representing the light of the Buddha's teachings, echoing the metaphor of light used in various Buddhist scriptures. See Loy Krathong and Ubon Ratchathani Candle Festival for examples of Buddhist festivals that makes extensive use of candles.

== Christianity ==
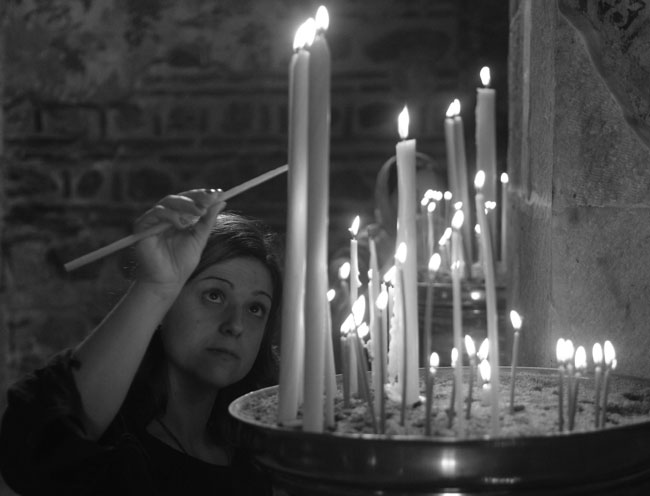
Candle lighting in the Visoki Dečani monastery.

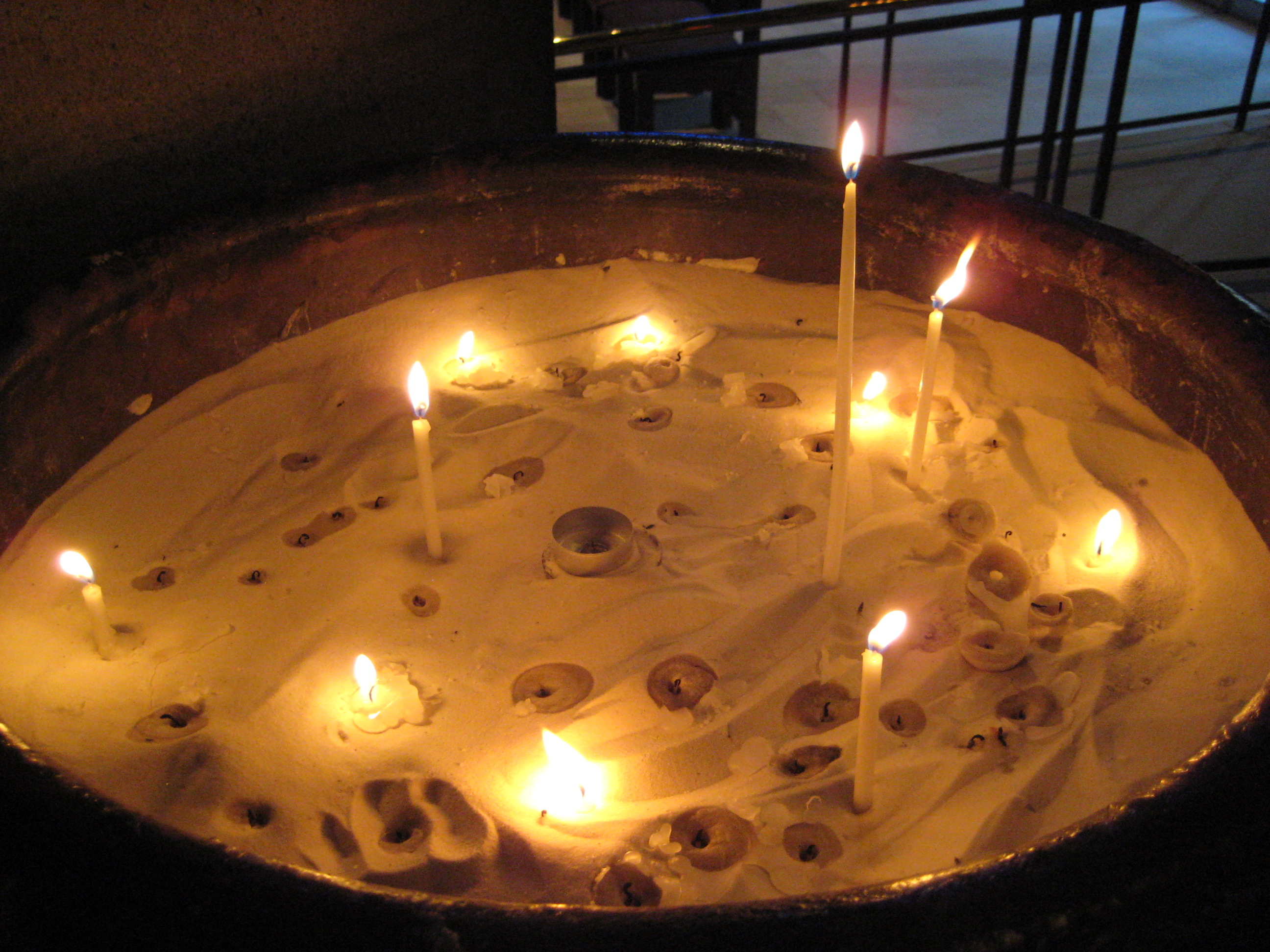
Candles are sometimes burned in churches and cathedrals as a sign of remembrance of the departed

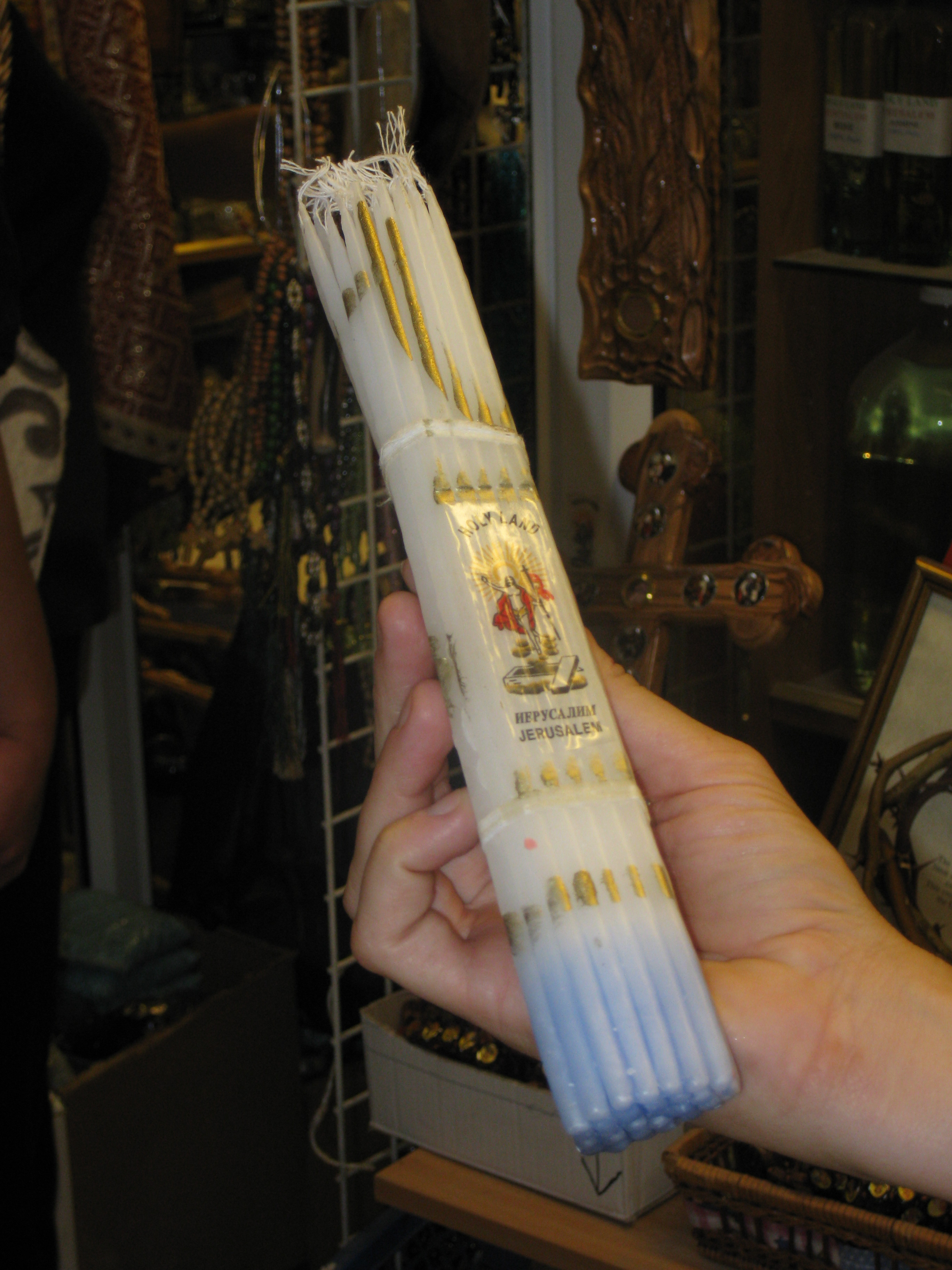
Bundle of candles sold in the shops of the Christian Quarter in the Old City of Jerusalem

In Christianity the candle is commonly used in worship both for decoration and ambiance, and as a symbol that represents the light of God or, specifically, the light of Christ. The altar candle is often placed on the altar, usually in pairs. Candles are also carried in processions, especially to either side of the processional cross. A votive candle or taper may be lit as an accompaniment to prayer.

Candles are lit by worshippers in front of icons in Eastern Orthodox, Oriental Orthodox, Eastern Catholic and other churches. This is referred to as "offering a candle", because the candle is a symbol of the worshiper offering himself or herself to God (and proceeds from the sale of the candle are offerings by the faithful which go to help the church). Among the Eastern Orthodox, there are times when the entire congregation stands holding lit tapers, such as during the reading of the Matins Gospels on Good Friday, the Lamentations on Holy Saturday, funerals, Memorial services, etc. There are also special candles that are used by Orthodox clergy. A bishop will bless using dikirion and trikirion (candlesticks holding two and three candles, respectively). At Pascha (Easter) the priest holds a special Paschal trikirion, and the deacon holds a Paschal candle. The priest will also bless the faithful with a single candle during the Liturgy of the Presanctified Gifts (celebrated only during Great Lent).

In the Roman Catholic Church a liturgical candle must be made of at least 51% beeswax, the remainder may be paraffin or some other substance. In the Orthodox Church, the tapers offered should be 100% beeswax, unless poverty makes this impossible. The stumps from burned candles can be saved and melted down to make new candles.

In some Western churches, a special candle known as the Paschal candle, specifically represents the Resurrected Christ and is lit only at Easter, funerals, and baptisms. In the Eastern Orthodox Church, during Bright Week (Easter Week) the priest holds a special Paschal trikirion (triple candlestick) and the deacon holds a large candle during all of the services at which they serve.

In Sweden (and other Scandinavian countries), St. Lucia Day is celebrated on December 13 with the crowning of a young girl with a wreath of candles.

In many Western churches, a group of candles arranged in a ring, known as an Advent wreath, are used in church services in the Sundays leading up to Christmas. In households in some Western European countries, a single candle marked with the days of December is gradually burned down, day by day, to mark the passing of the days of Advent; this is called an Advent candle.

== Judaism ==
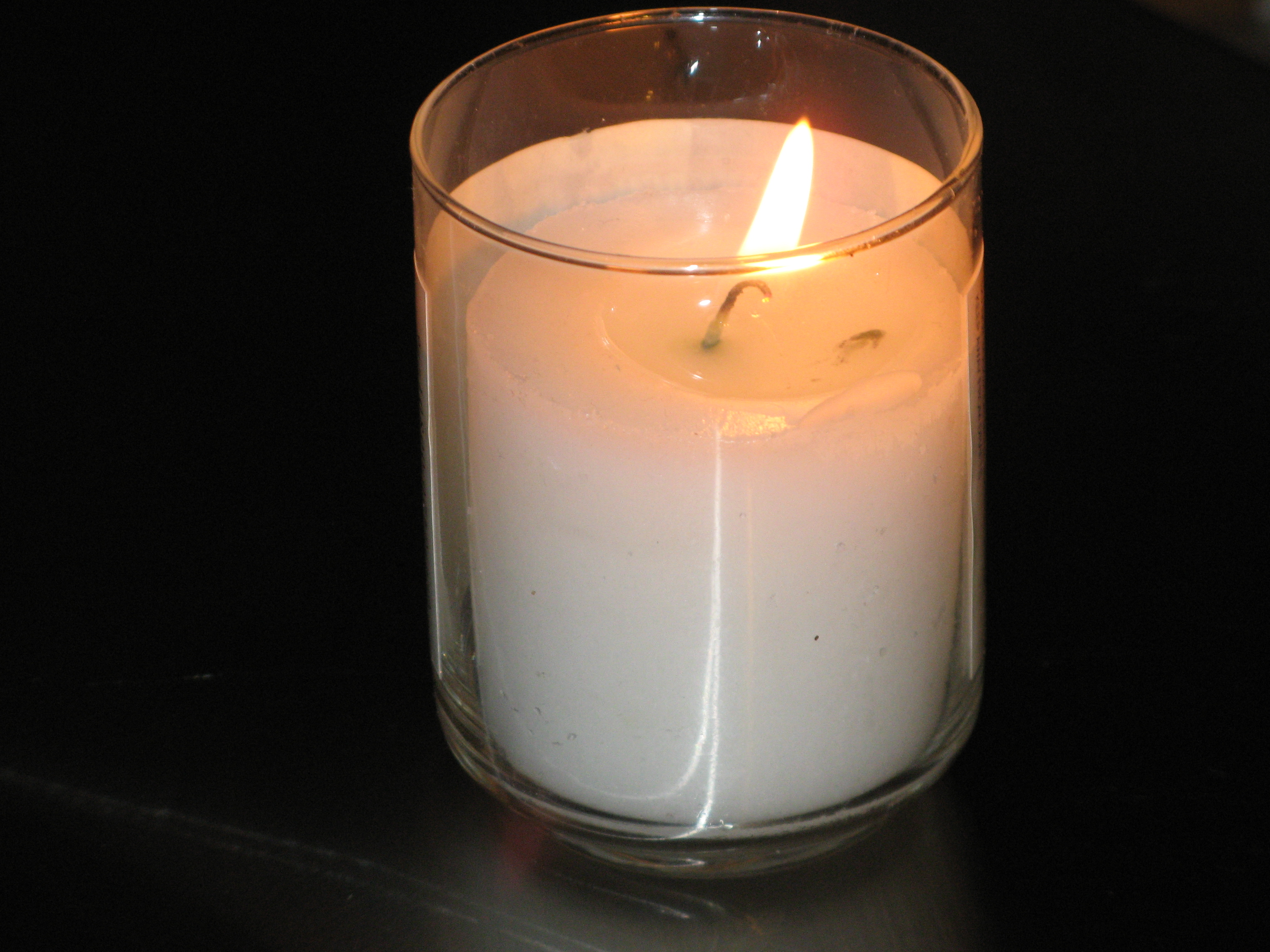
A yahrtzeit candle, lit on the Hebrew anniversary of a loved one's death

In Judaism, a pair of Shabbat candles are lit on Friday evening prior to the start of the weekly Sabbath celebration. On Saturday night, a special candle with several wicks and usually braided is lit for the Havdalah ritual marking the end of the Sabbath and the beginning of the new week.

The eight-day holiday of Hanukkah, also known as the Festival of Lights, is celebrated by lighting a special Hanukkiyah each night to commemorate the rededication of the Temple in Jerusalem.

A memorial candle is lit on the Yahrtzeit, or anniversary of the death of a loved one according to the Hebrew calendar. The candle burns for 24 hours. A memorial candle is also lit on Yom HaShoah, a day of remembrance for all those murdered in The Holocaust.

A seven-day memorial candle is lit following the funeral of a spouse, parent, sibling or child.

Candles are also lit prior to the onset of the Three Festivals (Sukkot, Passover and Shavuot) and the eve of Yom Kippur, and Rosh Hashana.

A candle is also used on the night before Passover in a symbolic search for chametz, or leavened bread, which is not eaten on Passover.

== Other traditions ==
The Candle is also used in celebrations of Kwanzaa, which is an African American holiday which runs from December 26 to January 1. A Kinara is used to hold candles in these celebrations. It holds seven candles; three red candles to represent African American struggles, one black candle to represent the African American people and three green candles to represent African American hopes.

During satanic rituals black candles are the only light source, except for one white candle on the altar. The dim lighting is used to create an air of mystique and the color of the candles has symbolic meaning.
