= Altar candle =

Candles set on or near altars

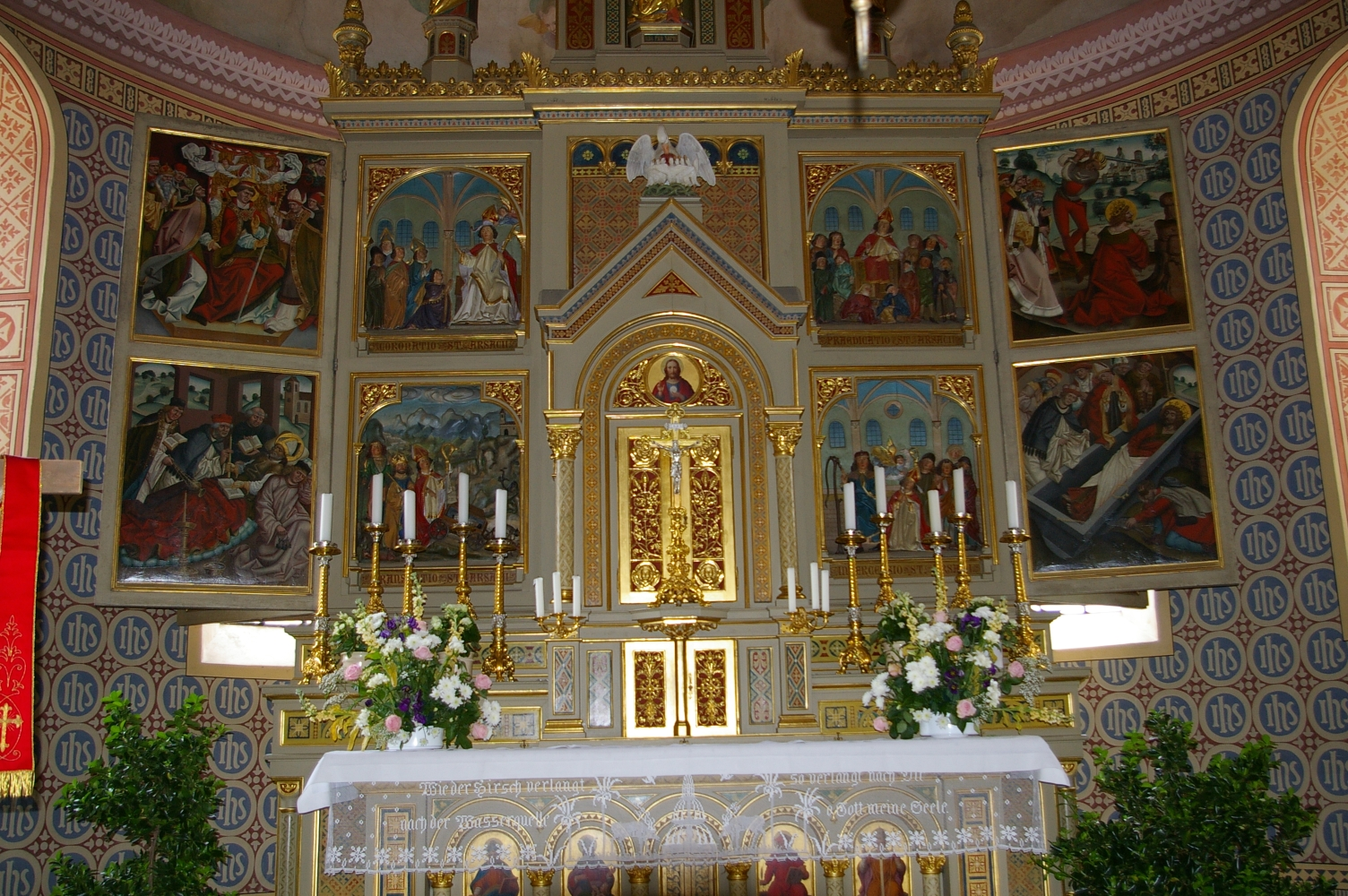
Altar candles, along with chancel flowers, sit atop of the altar of St. Arsacius's church in Ilmmünster, Bavaria.

Altar candles are candles set on or near altars for religious ceremonies. Various religions have regulations or traditions regarding the number and type of candles used, and when they are lit or extinguished, for example during the liturgies.

Altar candles may sit directly on the altar or be placed in tall stands to the side of or behind the altar. For safety, altar candles are secured in some type of candle holder, such as candlesticks, which may be simple or elaborate. To prevent wax from dripping, candles are often topped by a candle follower, a short tube made of brass, glass or some other non-flammable material.

== Christianity ==
=== Catholic Church ===
In the Roman Rite of the Catholic Church, candles are required to be placed on or beside the altar, at least for the celebration of Mass. For reasons of religious tradition, the Church used the candles at divine service that are made of beeswax.

==== Regulation ====
For celebration of Mass, it is required that "on or next to the altar are to be placed candlesticks with lighted candles: at least two in any celebration, or even four or six, especially for a Sunday Mass or a holy day of obligation. If the diocesan Bishop celebrates, then seven candles should be used."

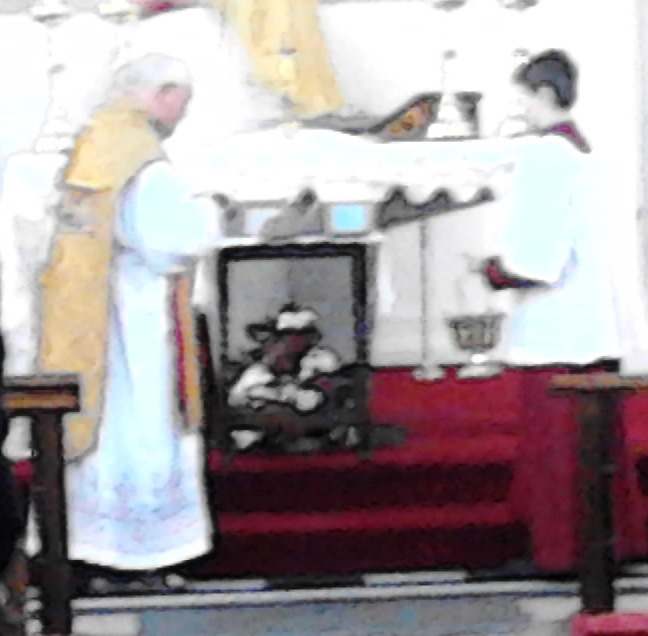
Blessing of the Candles at Candlemas at Saint Pancras Church, Ipswich

At the beginning of the 20th century, complex rules governed the composition and number of candles to be used at Mass. Lighted candles of the correct composition (beeswax, with no more than a minimal admixture of other material, and usually bleached) were considered so essential that, if before the consecration they happened to go out (quenched, for instance, by a gust of wind) and could not be relit within fifteen minutes, the celebration of Mass had to be abandoned, and some writers maintained that even if the candles could be relit within that time, Mass should in any case be begun again from the start. Some of these rules were formulated only in the second half of the nineteenth and the beginning of the 20th century. The Roman Missal of 1920 indicates that on the altar there should be "at least two candlesticks with lit candles" with a centrally placed cross between them. There is also a rule given in the same section of this Roman Missal that "a candle to be lit at the elevation of the Sacrament" should be placed with the cruets of wine and water to the Epistle side of the altar.

=== Lutheranism ===
Arthur Carl Piepkorn, in a liturgical directory entitled The Conduct of the Service, stated that the normal Lutheran practice was to use two candles on the altar:

It is proper to light the altar candles for all services. The Lutheran use is to have two single beeswax candles, set near the extremities of the altar, either on the gradine or as close as possible to the back of the mensa, if there be no gradine. Six candles is a Counter-Reformatory Roman use. Candelabra as substitutes for the two single candles are a Protestant sentimentality. The Epistle candle is lighted first; the Gospel candle last; they are extinguished in reverse order. Lighting with a match held in the hand is not reverent:—extinguishing with puffs of breath from bloating cheeks is even less so. Use a lighter and snuffer. The lights may be lit by the officiant if there be no one to assist him, or by a choirboy, or by a server appointed for the purpose. In any case the individual performing this task should be decently vested. New candles should be started before the service, or they may cause embarrassing difficulties.

=== Anglicanism ===
In Anglicanism, candles are used frequently in churches. Percy Dearmer, author of The Parson's Handbook, states that English use supports no more than two lights on the altar.

The use of a row of six candlesticks on the altar, or on a shelf or gradine behind it, is pure Romanism, and a defiance of the Ornaments Rubric, as of all other authority in the Church of England. From the beginning of the thirteenth century to the end of the nineteenth every declaration on the subject has mentioned the two lights on the altar only, and to this ancient and universal use of two lights, at the most, every known representation bears witness. Any one within reach of a large picture-gallery can verify this for himself; in the National Gallery, for instance, there are many illustrations of great interest in the Flemish, German, and Italian rooms and among the drawings of the Arundel collection. The evidence of the inventories, directories, &c., is practically the same. Now the instinct which led the church in the great ages of architecture and craftsmanship to use altar lights in this way was a true one; for an altar with two candlesticks upon it is more majestic and more beautiful than an altar with more than two. Furthermore, a row of candles hides the reredos or upper frontal, which ought to be one of the richest and most lovely things in the church

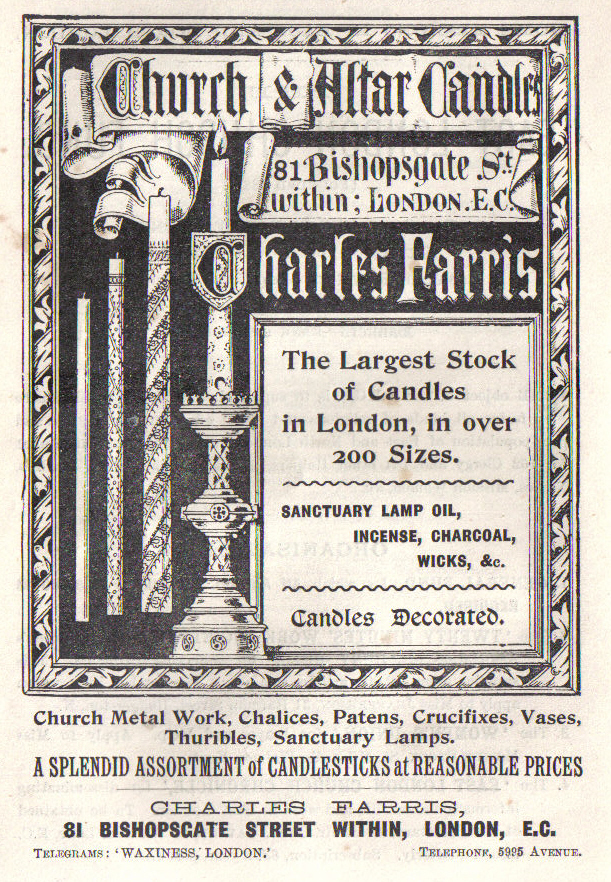
"Church & altar candles"; Charles Farris

He points out, however, that English and north European sanctions the use of other candles near the altar, e.g., there were "very often two Standards on the pavement" and "one very beautiful method was to have sconces for candles on the top of the four poles that sometimes stood at the four corners of the altar to carry the riddels." He concludes:

A church may therefore have (1) two lights on the altar; (2) two standards on the pavement, or four if the sanctuary is large enough (as is seldom the case) for their comely arrangement without overcrowding; (3) other lights near but not behind the altar (preferably two or four on the rods or pillars for the riddels) for use on the principal feasts; (4) others hanging from the roof in candelabra."

In the Protestant Episcopal Church in the United States of America, churches typically use two candles in the following manner:

Altar candles are tall, thin candles made of beeswax and stearine. They are topped with a brass or glass candle follower, which helps keep wax from spilling on the altar linens. Altar candles are lit using a taper, which is a lit wick attached to a long handle. They are lit and extinguished in a particular order so that the Gospel side candle is never burning alone. The Gospel side of the church is the left side as you are facing the front. So the candles are lit from right to left and extinguished from left to right.

==== Methodism ====
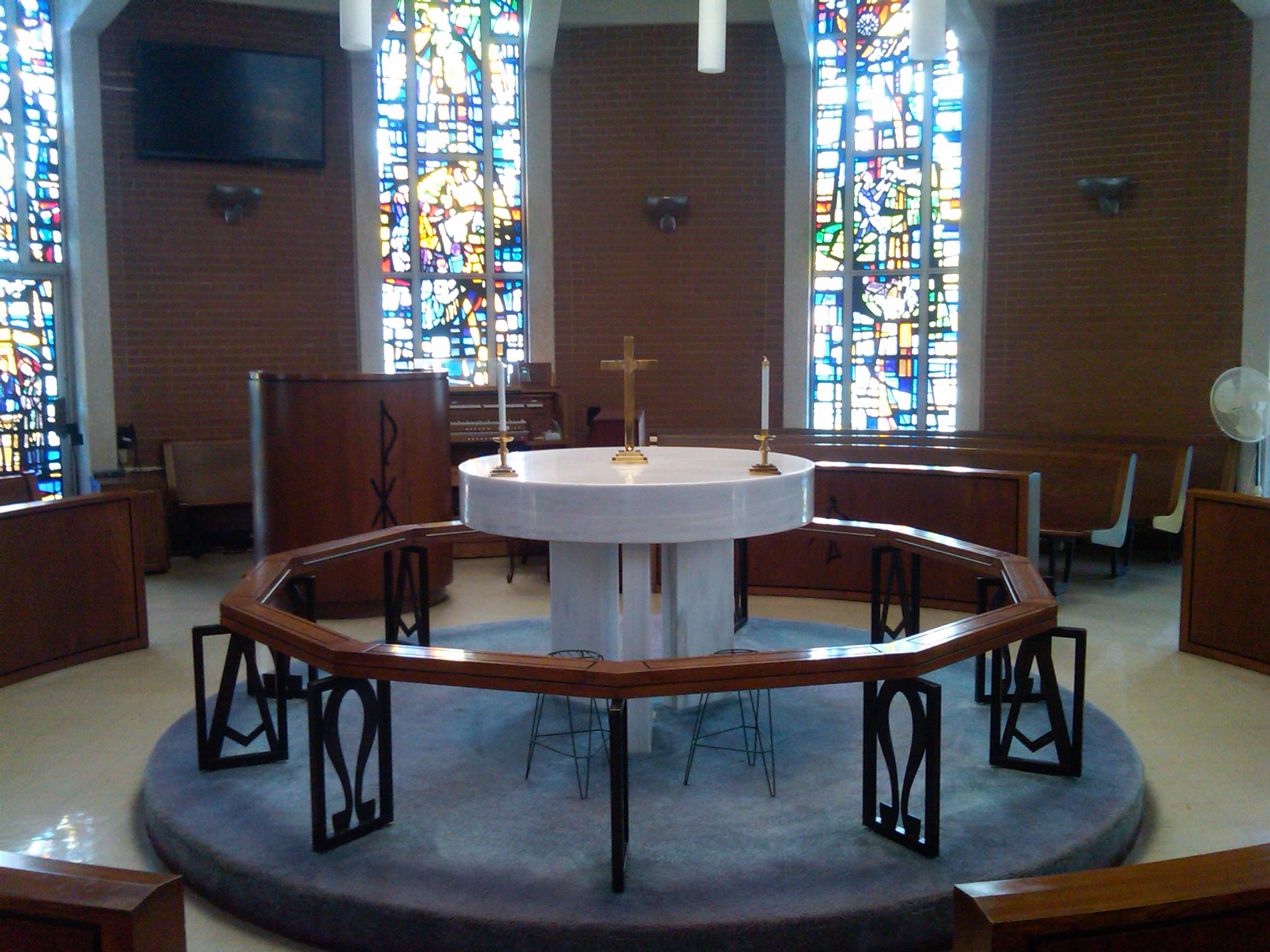
Two altar candles adorn the altar table of a Methodist chapel in Kent, Ohio, United States

Methodist churches typically use (normally two) candles in a manner similar to the Anglican way.

Many congregations use two candles on the altar to point out that Jesus was both a human being and God. At the end of the service, the light is carried out into the world to show that Jesus Christ is for all people everywhere [...] The acolyte leaves the worship service at the pastor's direction, carrying out the lighted candlelighter. This symbolizes the light of Jesus Christ going out into the world where believers are to serve.

== Other religions ==
=== Taoism ===
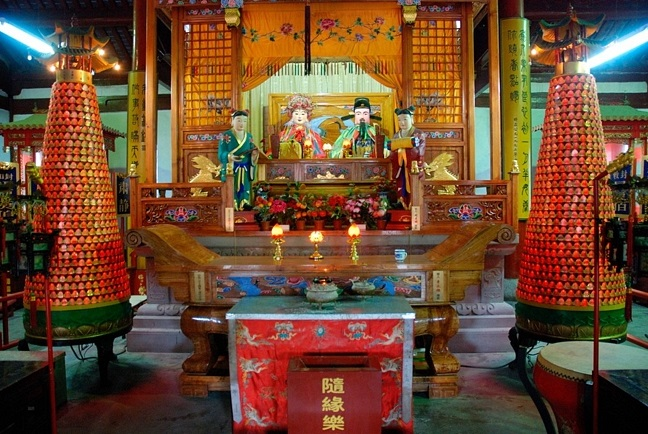
Taoist Altar showing three lamps, representing the Tao (center), Yin (left) and Yang (right)

In the Taoist religion, a central lamp on the altar represents the Tao, while two candles to the left and right of it represent the Yin and Yang respectively.

== See also ==
- Religious symbol
- Paraments
- Ceremonial use of lights
