= Paschal candle =

Candle used in liturgies of Western Christian churches during the Easter season

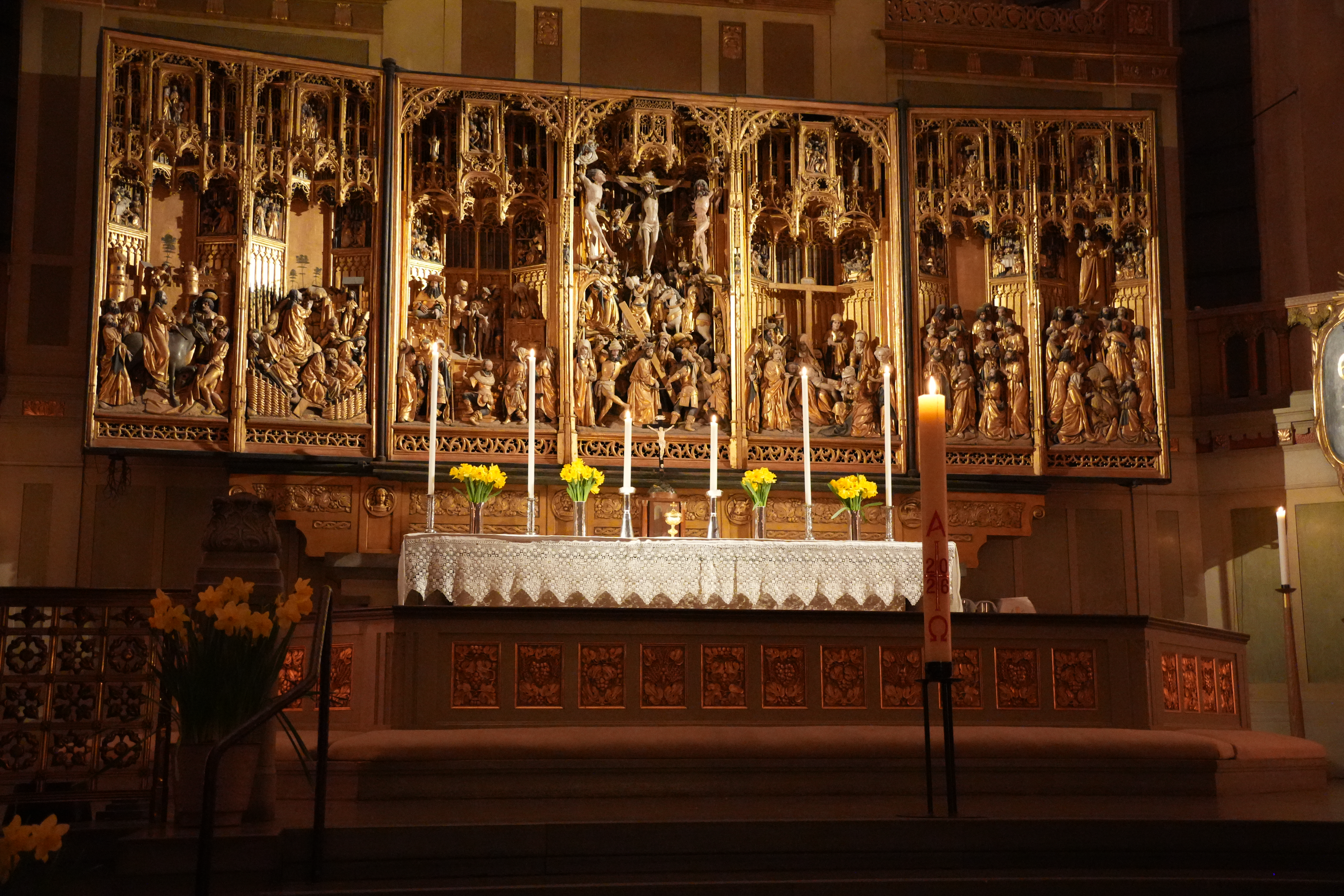
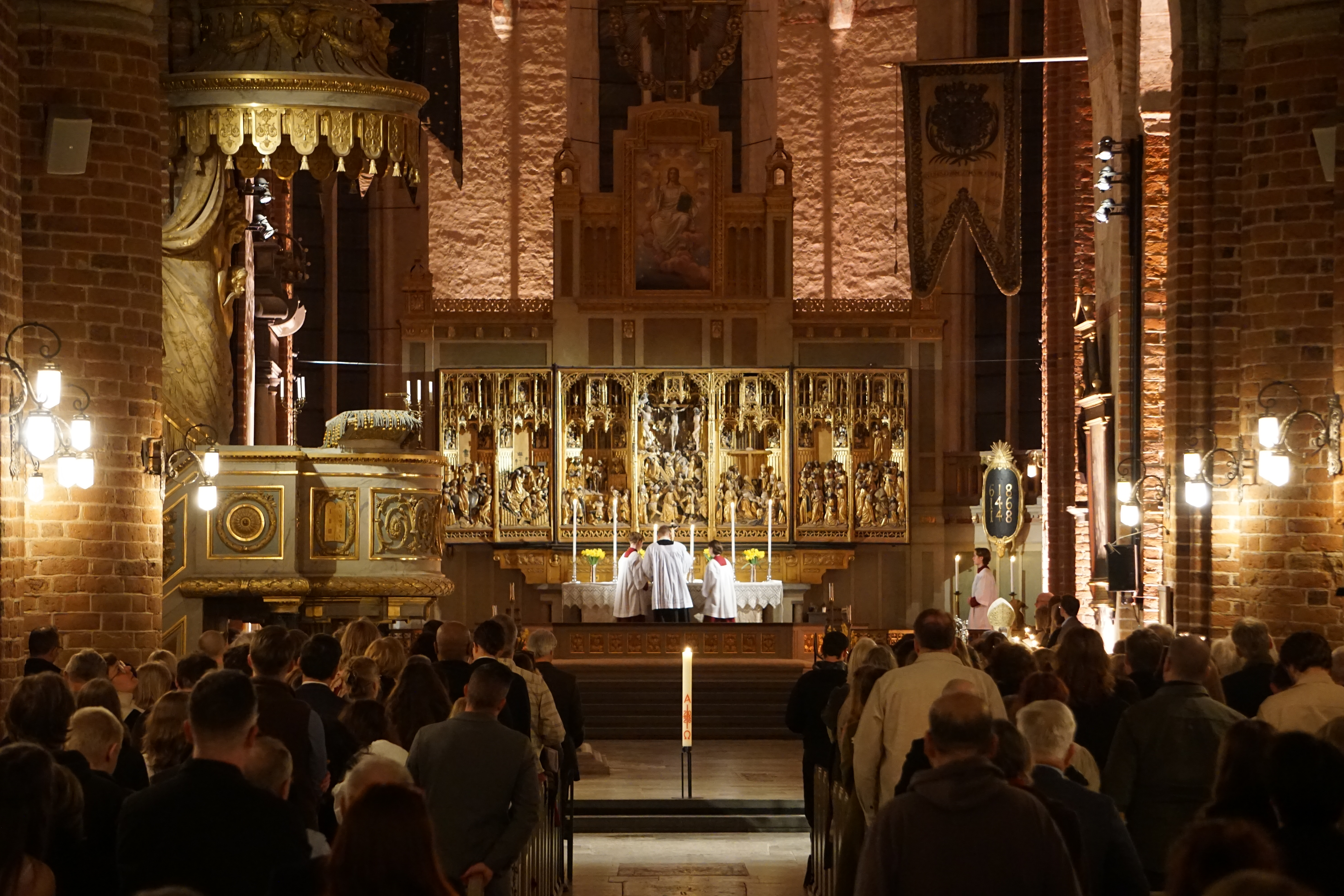
The Paschal candle lit during the Easter Vigil at Strängnäs Evangelical-Lutheran Cathedral in Sweden (2026)

A Paschal candle or Easter candle is a large candle used in liturgies in Western Christianity (viz., the Roman Catholic Church, the Lutheran churches, the Anglican Communion, and the Methodist churches, among others). A new Paschal candle is blessed and lit every year at Easter. It is used throughout the Eastertide and then throughout the year on occasions such as baptisms, funerals and some other special occasions such as the ordination of priests, taking vows or the Consecration of virgins, when the fire from the Paschal candle is carried with a wick to light another liturgical candle, as for example the baptismal candle.

The equivalent of the Paschal candle in the Eastern Orthodox Church is the Paschal trikirion, which differs in both style and usage.

== Etymology ==
The term Paschal comes from the Latin word Pascha, which came from the Hebrew word Pesach (/ˈpɛsɑːx, ˈpeɪ-/; פֶּסַח), meaning Passover, and relates to the Paschal mystery of salvation. It is sometimes referred to as the "Easter candle" or the "Christ candle".

== Description ==
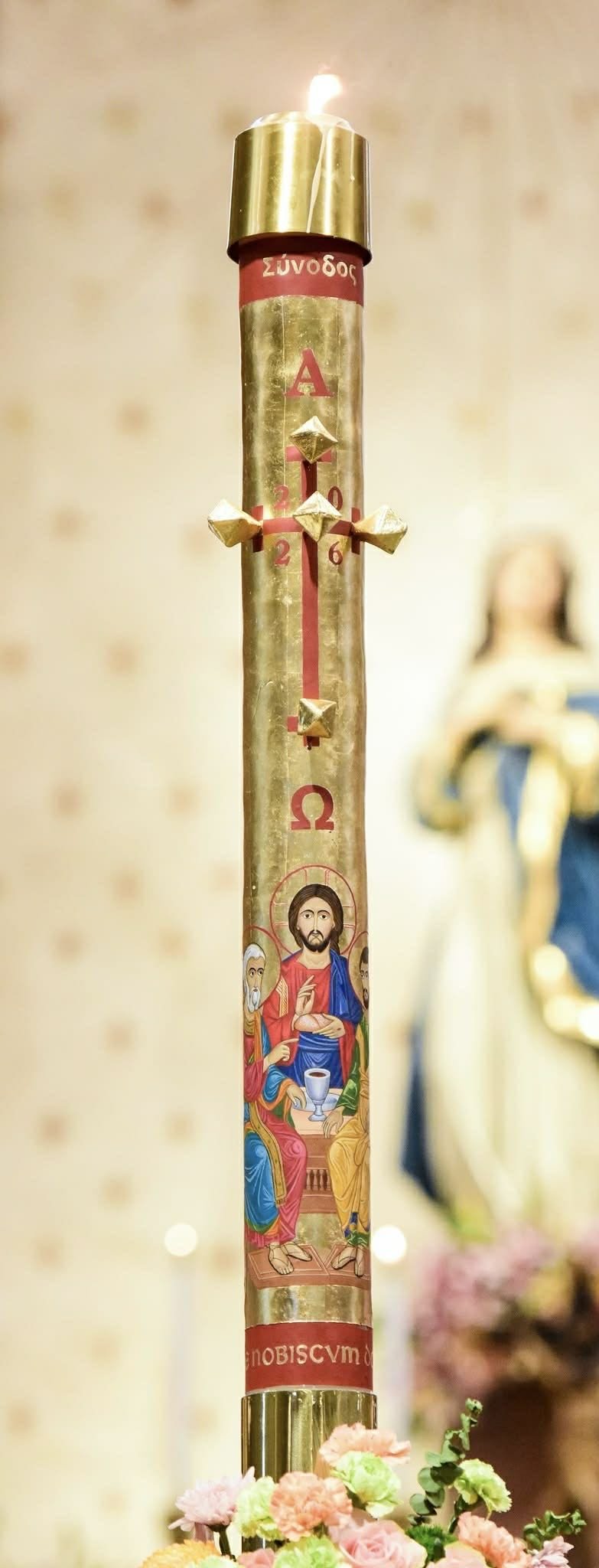
The Paschal candle of The Manila Cathedral. The candle is coated and painted with gold leaf and a depiction of the Last Supper.

For congregations that use a Paschal candle, it is the largest candle in the worship space. In most cases, the candle will display several common symbols:

1. The cross, which is the most prominent symbol and most clearly identifies it as the Paschal candle
2. The Greek letters alpha and omega, which symbolize that God is the beginning and the end (from the Book of Revelation)
3. The numerals of the current year between the arms of the cross
4. Five grains of incense, which are embedded in the candle (usually encased in red or golden wax "nails"). The "nails" represent the Five Holy Wounds: the three nails that pierced Christ's hands and feet, the spear thrust into his side to wound his heart, and the thorns that crowned his head. The grains of incense are to recall the aromatic spices that were used to prepare Christ's body for the tomb.

In the (medieval) church, Paschal candles often reached a stupendous size. The Paschal candle of Salisbury Cathedral was said to have been 36 feet (11 metres) tall. At present time, in the United States and Southern Europe (e.g., Italy and France) the candle is approximately 4 inches (10 centimetres) in diameter and 36 to 48 inches (91 to 122 centimetres) tall; in Northern Europe the candle tends to be shorter in height (19 to 24 inches/48 to 61 centimetres) and wider in diameter (3 to 5 inches/7.6 to 12.7 centimetres). The Paschal candle of Manila Cathedral usually reaches 4 or 4.5 inches (10 or 11 centimetres) and stands at 50 inches (130 centimetres) tall.

The Paschal candle, like all liturgical candles, must be made at least from the most part of beeswax (ex cera apum saltem in maxima parte). The Church Fathers saw the bee as a symbol of the Virgin Mary. The beeswax symbolized the pure flesh of Christ, received from his mother.

== Usage ==
=== Easter Vigil ===
For churches that celebrate the Easter Vigil on the night of Holy Saturday, the ceremonial preparation, dedication and lighting of the Paschal candle is one of the most solemn moments of the service. The Easter Vigil liturgies of the Roman Catholic, Lutheran, Anglican, Methodist and Presbyterian churches are nearly identical.

On Maundy Thursday of the same week the entire church is darkened by extinguishing all candles and lamps. This and the empty tabernacle symbolise the darkness of a world without Christ.

At the opening of the Easter Vigil a fire is lit and blessed. The minister will cuts a cross in the wax with a stylus and trace the symbols on the Paschal candle, saying words similar to: "Christ, yesterday and today, the Beginning and the End, the Alpha and the Omega. All time belongs to him and all the ages; to him be glory and power through every age for ever. Amen." He then inserts five grains of incense (reminiscent of the nails used to fasten Christ on the Cross) on the five points of the cross, saying: "By his holy and glorious wounds, may Christ our Lord guard us and keep us. Amen."

The Paschal candle is the first candle to be lit with a flame from this sacred fire, representing the light of Christ coming into the world. This represents the risen Christ, as a symbol of light (life) dispelling darkness (death). Before it is lit, the minister says words similar to: "May the light of Christ, rising in glory, dispel the darkness of our hearts and minds."

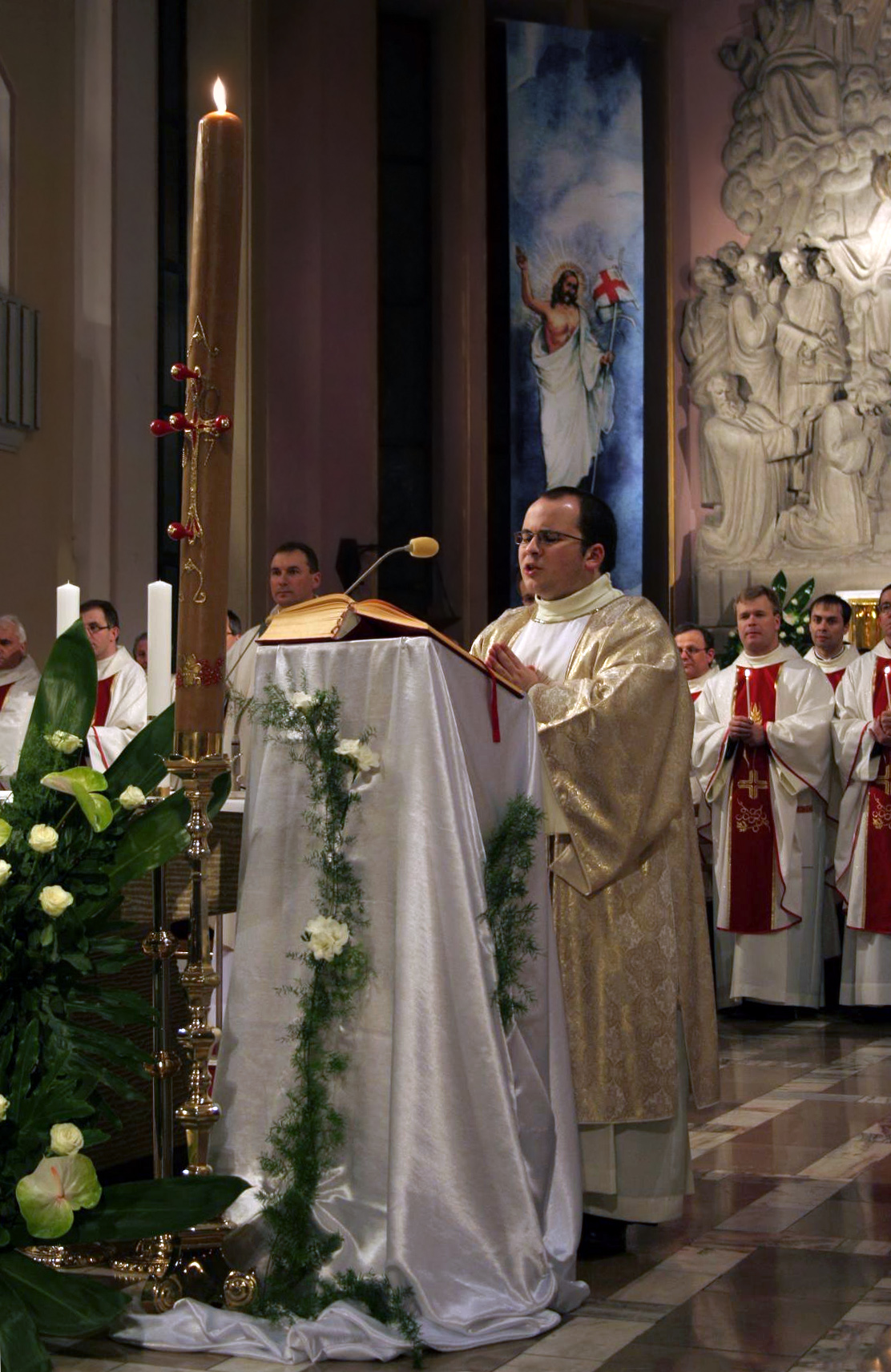
Deacon chanting the Exultet beside the Paschal candle

Typically, the worshiping assembly then processes into the church led by the Paschal candle. The candle is raised three times during the procession, accompanied by the chant "The light of Christ" to which the assembly responds "Thanks be to God".

In some communities, it is common for nearby churches of different Christian denominations (e.g. Catholic, Lutheran, Anglican, Methodist and Presbyterian) to make the new Easter Fire together and then after this, each congregation processes back to their own church with their own Paschal Candle for their Easter Vigil celebration; this is considered to be a fostering of ecumenism.

Following the procession the Exultet is chanted, traditionally by a deacon, but it may be chanted by the priest or – most parts of it – by a cantor. The Exultet concludes with the offering of the candle: From the Roman Missal:

On this, your night of grace, O holy father, accept this candle, a solemn offering, the work of bees and of your servants' hands, an evening sacrifice of praise, this gift from your most holy Church. But now we know the praises of this pillar, which glowing fire ignites for God's honor, a fire into many flames divided, yet never dimmed by sharing of its light, for it is fed by melting wax, drawn out by mother bees to build a torch so precious. O truly blessed night, when things of heaven are wed to those of earth, and divine to the human. Therefore, O Lord, we pray you that this candle, hallowed to the honor of your name, may persevere undimmed, to overcome the darkness of this night. Receive it as a pleasing fragrance, and let it mingle with the lights of heaven. May this flame be found still burning by the Morning Star: the one Morning Star who never sets, Christ your son, who, coming back from death's domain, has shed his peaceful light on humanity, and lives and reigns for ever and ever.

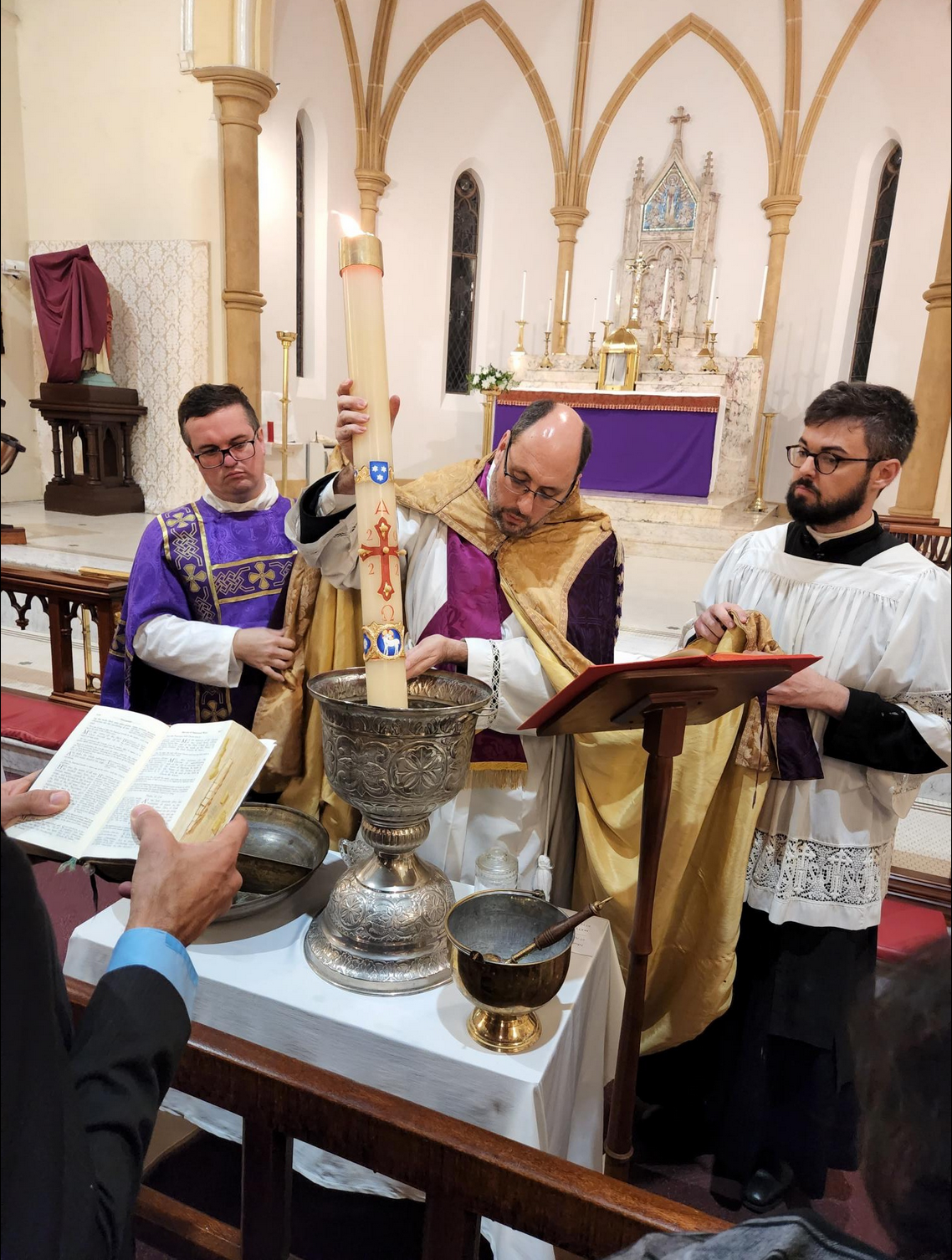
The blessing of the baptismal water

After the Litany of the Saints, while the priest sings the blessing with the request for the descent of the Holy Spirit, he may lower the Paschal candle three times into the baptismal water. In some Eastern traditions, wax is dripped into the water for an even richer symbolism.

=== Other times of the year ===
The candle remains in the sanctuary close to the altar and is lit at least in all the more solemn worship services until Pentecost (or in some traditions until Ascension Day, when it is extinguished just after the Gospel). In this context the Paschal candle symbolises the presence of the glorified risen Christ.

After Eastertide, the candle should be kept in the baptistry, so that in the celebrations of baptisms the candles of the baptized may be lit from the candle. The Paschal candle is lit during baptisms to signify the Holy Spirit and fire that John the Baptist promised to those who were baptised in Christ.

Before 1955, the option existed of blessing the baptismal font on the Vigil of Pentecost, and this was the only time the Paschal candle would be lit at services after Ascension. In the Ordinary form of the Roman Rite, the Paschal candle is lit and should be placed near the coffin during the Mass of the repose of the soul or the Requiem. This is to indicate that the death of a Christian is his or her own passover.

== Eastern usage ==
In the Eastern Orthodox and Byzantine Catholic churches, there is no direct correspondence to the Western Paschal candle. However, throughout Bright Week, the priest carries a cross and paschal trikirion at all of the services, especially when censing, during the Little Entrance or when giving the Paschal greeting. The trikirion consists of three lit candles in a candlestick, which the priest carries in his left hand. In the Slavic tradition, the three candles may be white or different colors: green, red, blue. The deacon also carries a special Paschal candle which is a single large candle whenever he leads an ektenia (litany) or censes.
