= Paschal trikirion =

Liturgical triple-candlestick

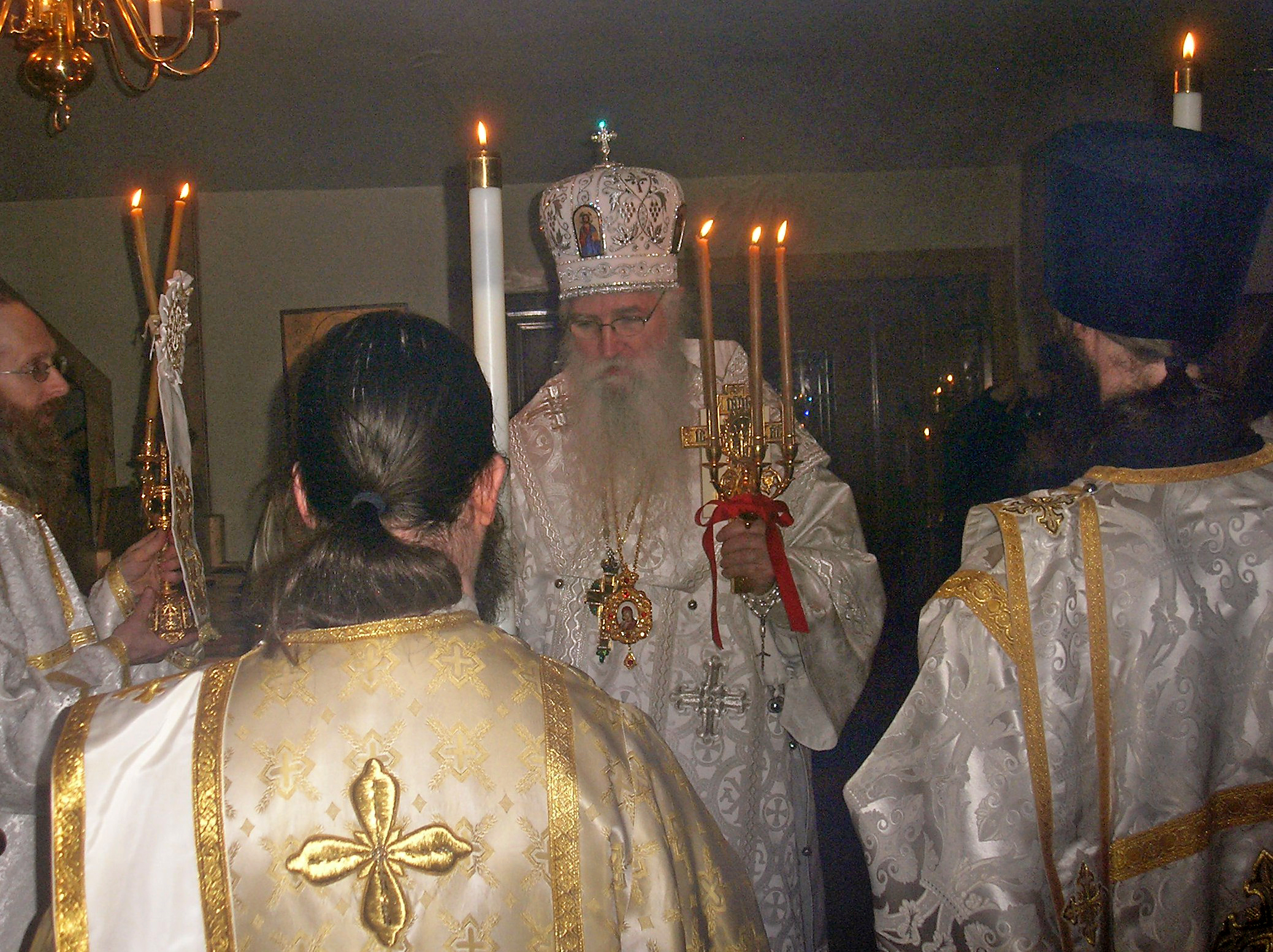
Eastern Orthodox bishop holding a paschal trikirion with two deacons (backs to camera) holding paschal deacon's candles

The Paschal trikirion (Greek: τρικήριον) is a liturgical triple-candlestick used at Easter time in the Eastern Orthodox and Byzantine Catholic traditions.

== Liturgical use ==
The paschal trikirion is not mentioned in the liturgical books of the Eastern Orthodox Church; indeed, both the Pentecostarion and the Typicon dictate the celebrant carry a cross in his left hand when, in contemporary practice, the paschal trikirion is also carried.

The paschal trikirion is held by the serving priest (whether a bishop or a presbyter) in contrast to the bishop's trikirion which the bishop uses for blessing and is held or carried alongside the bishop. It is used from the commencement of the celebration of the Resurrection during the Paschal Vigil through the end of Bright Week, and also on the Apodosis of Pascha, when it is used at sundry times, in particular, while chanting the paschal verses at the beginning of Vespers, Matins and the Divine Liturgy, while censing, during the Little Entrance, and when giving the paschal greeting.

== Deacon's candle ==
As specified in the liturgical books the Pentecostarion and the Typicon, deacons also carry a candle throughout the paschal services. The deacon's candle is a single large candle which he carries in his left hand while reciting ektenias (litanies), while censing, and at other times when his hands are not otherwise occupied. It is also often decorated with fresh flowers. In the Slavic tradition, this candle may be red.

== See also ==
- Dikirion and trikirion
- Paschal candle
