= Bobèche (disambiguation) =

Bobèche can mean different things:

- Bobèche is a type of candlestick holder.
- Bobèche is the name of a particular French clown.
