= Girandole =

Ornamental branched candle holder

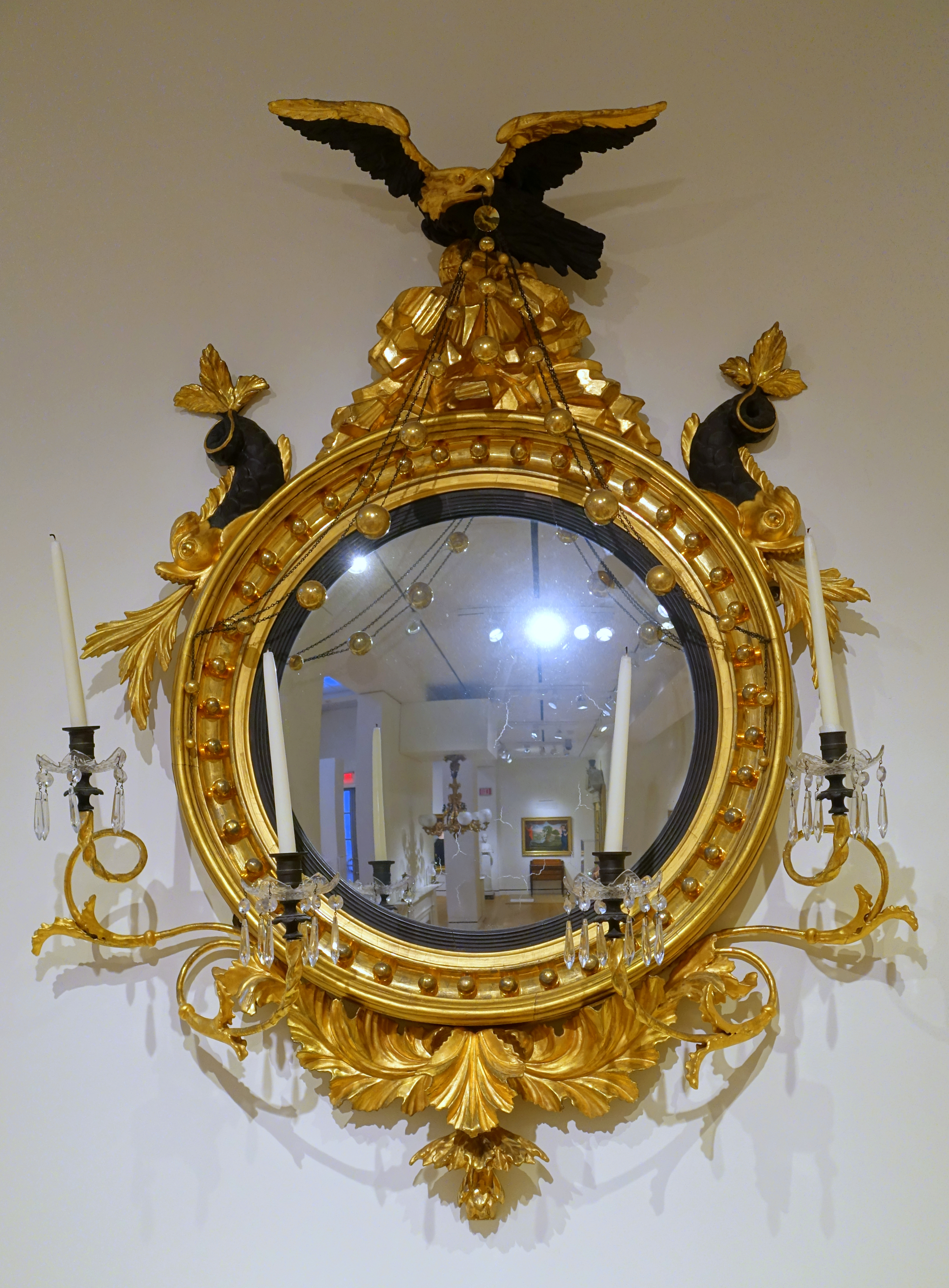
A girandole with convex mirror

A girandole (/ˈdʒɪrəndəʊl/) is an ornamental branched candle holder consisting of several lights that may be on a stand or mounted on the wall, either by itself or attached to a mirror. Girandole has been used to refer to a number of different objects and designs; it originally referred to a form of firework, but was adopted in France in the mid-17th century as a term for a luxurious object for lighting. The early girandoles were candelabras decorated with crystals looking like a chandelier on a stand, but it was also used at one time to describe all candelabras and chandeliers, with or without crystals. In the 18-century, a girandole may be attached to a mirror, and large wall-mounted girandoles with a mirror incorporated became fashionable in England in the second half of the 18th century. A form of girandole backed with a round convex mirror was also popular in the United States in the early 19th century.

== Etymology ==
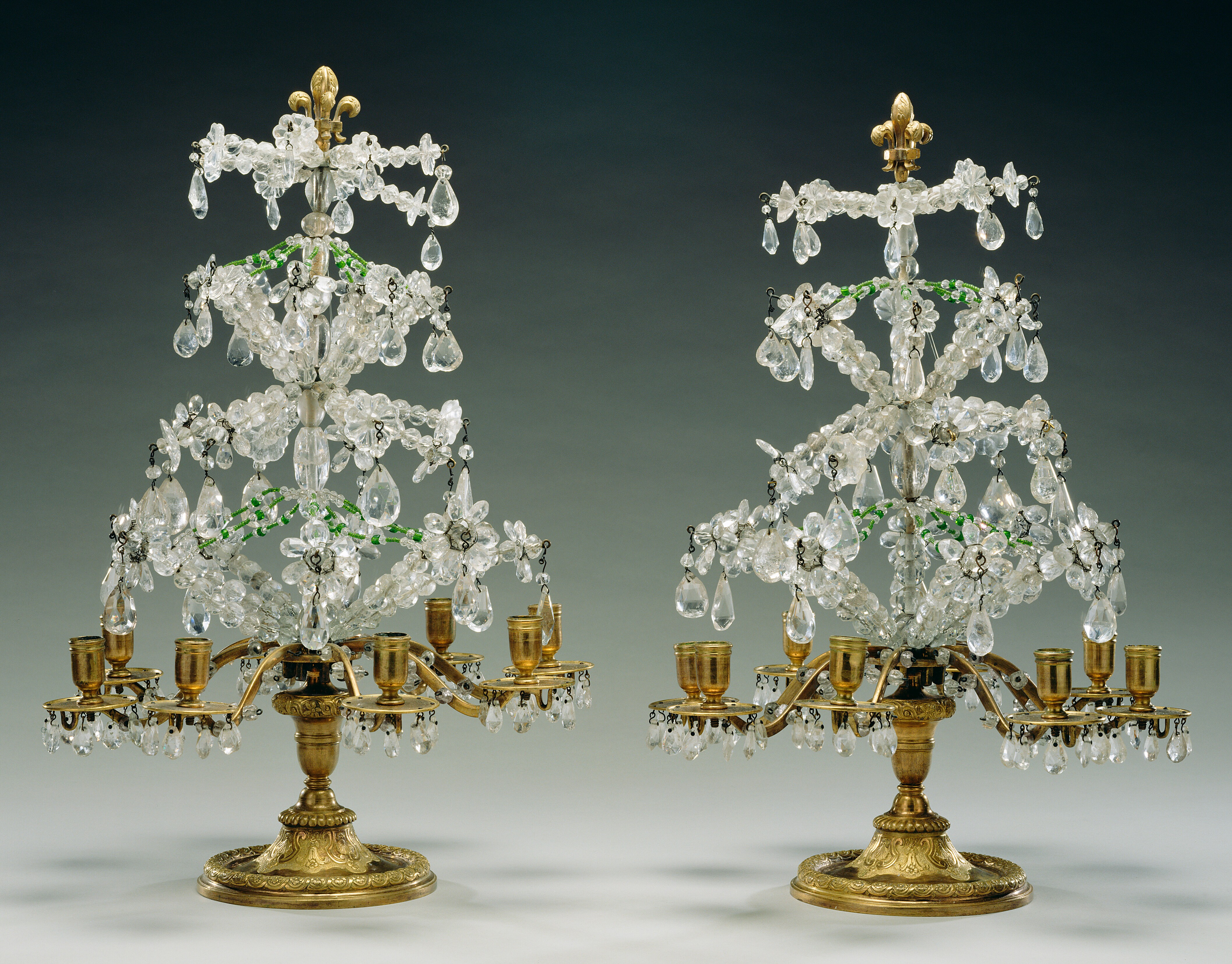
A pair of late-17th century French girandoles

The word girandole first appeared in English in the first half of the 17th century in reference to a rotating firework. It comes from the French girandole, which is in turn derived from the Italian girandola, meaning a kind of horizontal Catherine wheel-like firework. Girandola is a diminutive of giranda, deriving from girare and Latin gyrāre, meaning "to gyrate", which in turn comes from gyrus and ultimately from Greek gŷros meaning "ring or circle".

Girandole as a decorative lighting object may have been named after the horizontal Catherine wheel-like firework – the early form of girandole was a branched candlestick with arms that radiate out from a central axis like the spokes of a wheel, thereby resembling the firework.

== Usage ==
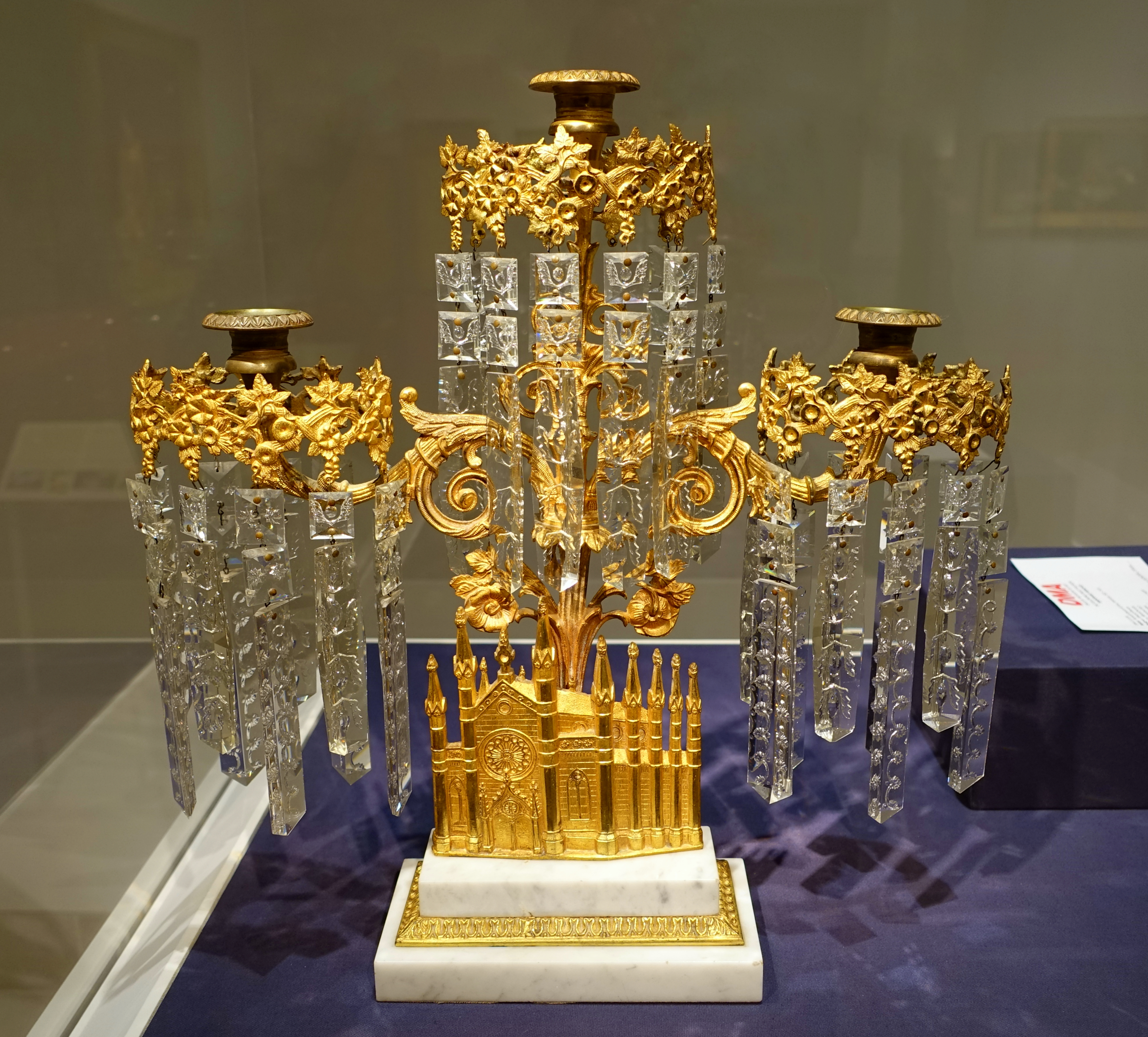
An ornate American candelabra hung with crystals described as a girandole

Girandole has been used as a term for a variety of lighting devices and objects. Originally a term for a type of firework, it was used in the second half of the 17th century in France to mean a type of candelabra, usually with 6 arms emerging from a central stem. The girandoles of this period were ornate candelabras pyramidal in shape often hung with pendants of crystals. This, along with the firework, is still one of the definitions of girandole in France today. In England, candelabras made with glass were sold as girandoles in England until the late 18th century. Ornate candelabra with hanging crystals were also described as girandoles in the United States in the mid-19th century. These usually come in sets of three, with a 3 or 5-arm candelabra flanked by two similarly decorated single-armed candlesticks.

In the mid-18th century in England, it referred to a large gilded decorative sconce, or a wall light backed with a mirror. Later the mirror, especially if it is circular and convex, may be called girandole by itself without the candle holders. The wall-mounted lighting object is a common definition of girandole in English today. Some large dressing glasses of the 19th century were known as "girandoles" because of the lighting devices mounted to their sides. A form of girandole with a chandelier in front of a mirror was created in Ireland in the late 18th century.

In Italy, girandola refers to the firework, a weather vane, or a pinwheel toy. In Poland, the word girandole (żyrandol) means a chandelier, but it is also used to describe a traditional folk art. A popular form is "spider girandoles", which are decorative objects hung from the ceiling. These may be made from tissue paper cut, wrapped or manipulated into flowers or garland, and as festoons stretched starwise at the ceiling.

Girandole is used in jewellery design to mean an earring with a large central stone or piece with smaller stones attached. A popular form of girandole earrings consists of 3 pendant drops hanging from a larger cluster in the shape of a bow or other designs, like the branches of a candelabra. Girandole has also been used to describe a clock in the United States where the timepiece sits on top of a trunk and a round base in the shape of a girandole mirror.

== Designs ==
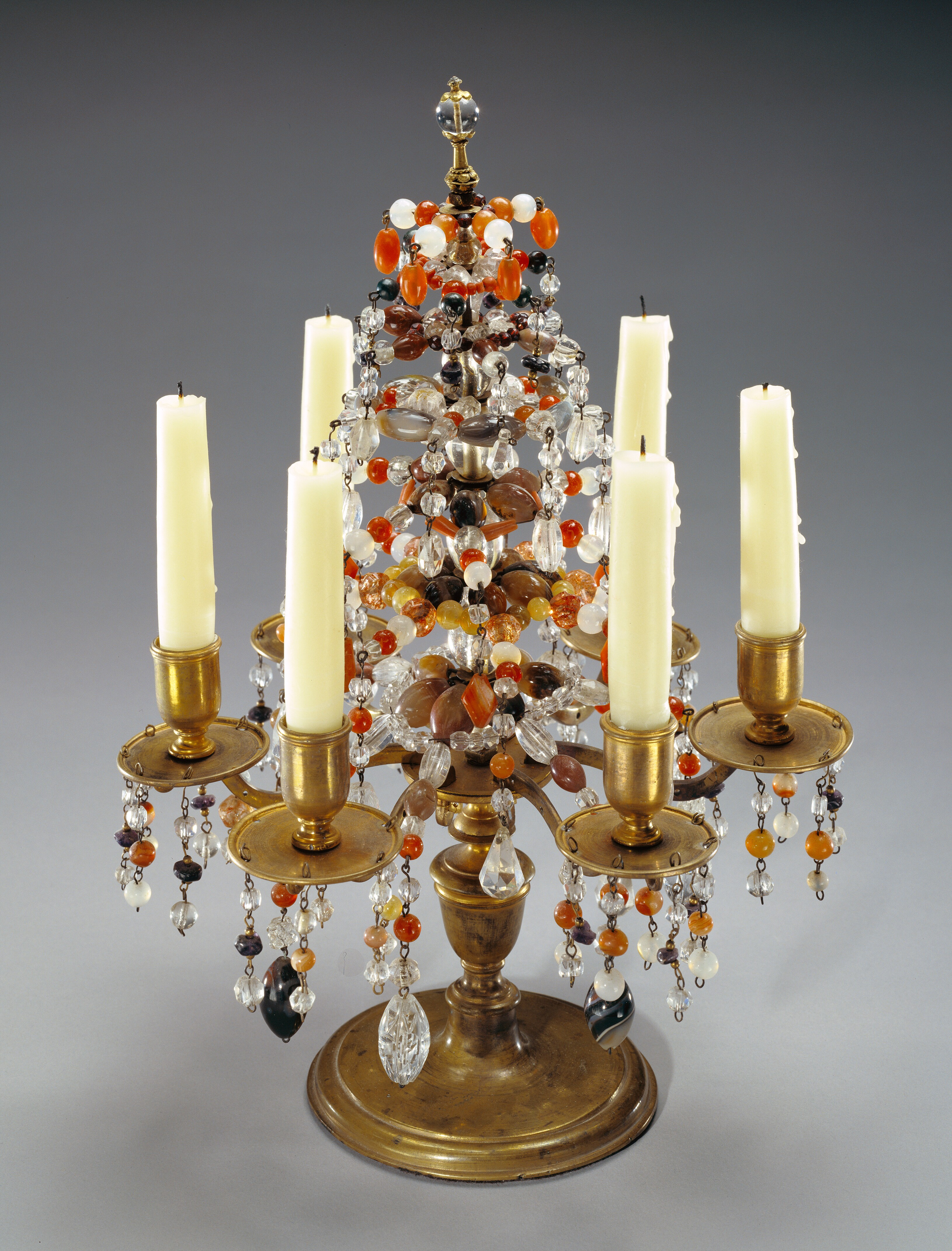
Late-17th century French girandole decorated with crystals and semi-precious stones

Girandoles as decorative candelabras appeared as items in French royal households around 1660, and an early version may have existed in 1653. Many girandoles were found in the Palace of Versailles. It was also used in the private residences of the wealthy by the late 17th century. It stayed popular in France in the 18th century, when some exceptional examples of girandole were created by famous ciseleurs of the period. These girandoles were usually made and used in pairs, and together with sconces they lit the middle section of the room below the chandeliers.

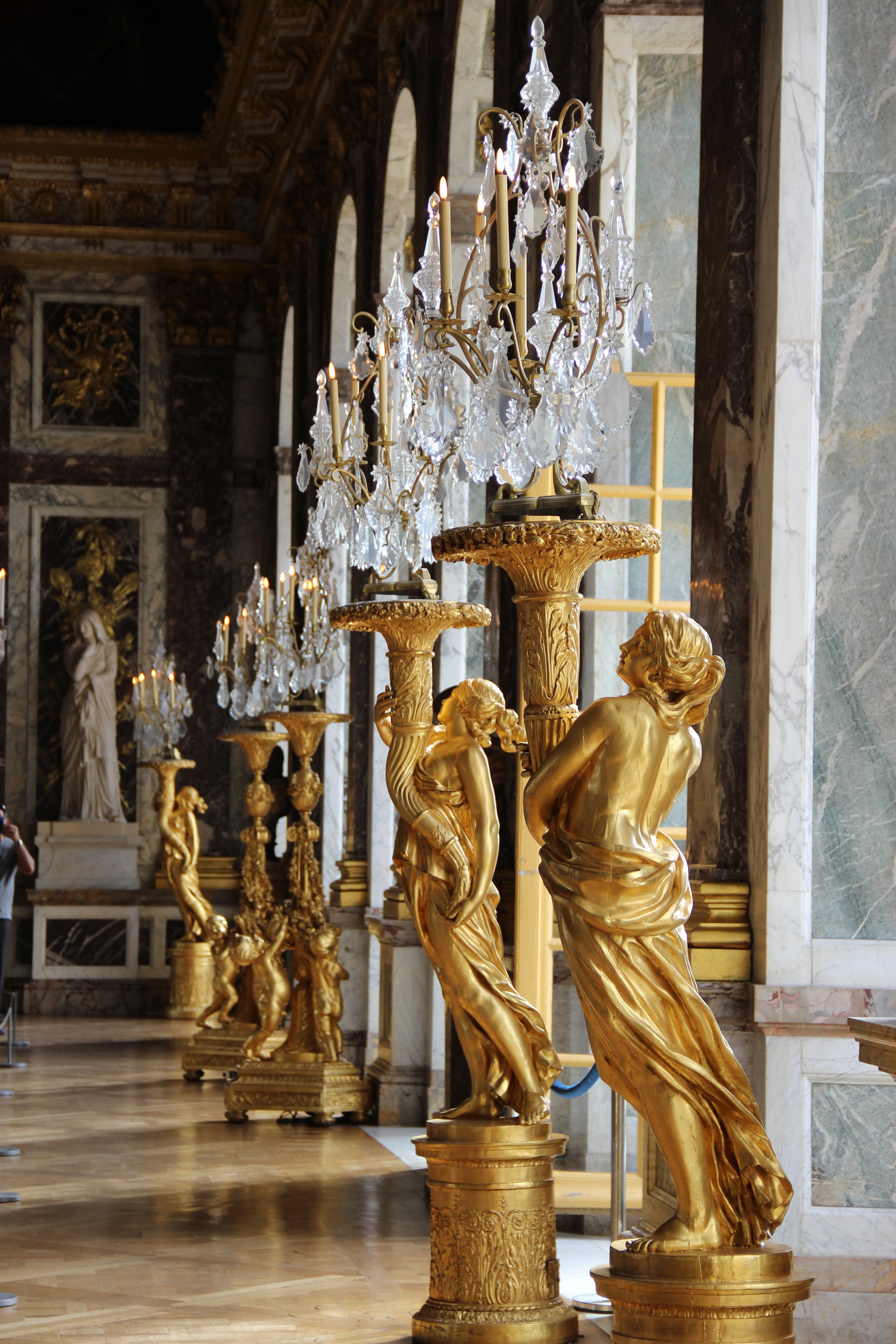
Girandoles on torchères in the Hall of Mirrors. Versailles

The early French girandoles have a base, a central stem and a plate that usually holds six arms with drip pans and bobèche for the candles. They were often decorated with rock crystals and glass – these may be strung together as beads, or hung as pendants or rosettes in a pyramidal or cone-shape arrangement, adding sparkles to the candleholder by reflecting the candlelight. More extravagant girandoles may include semi-precious stones such as amethyst, agate, chalcedony as well as coral, carnelian and jade. Girandoles can also be designed as sculptural figures, which may be made of gilt bronze with or without crystals. In the 18th century, porcelain girandoles with floral decorations were popular. Some girandoles were made of silver, but gold was limited to the royal palaces. The girandoles may be small, but they can also become quite large, with some around eight feet tall including a large sculptural base recorded. The smaller girandoles could be placed on a sideboard, a table or guéridon, while larger one were often placed on a torchère. The popularity of girandoles declined in the 19th century in France, and those that were made there were mainly copies of older designs.

18th century English designs for girandoles

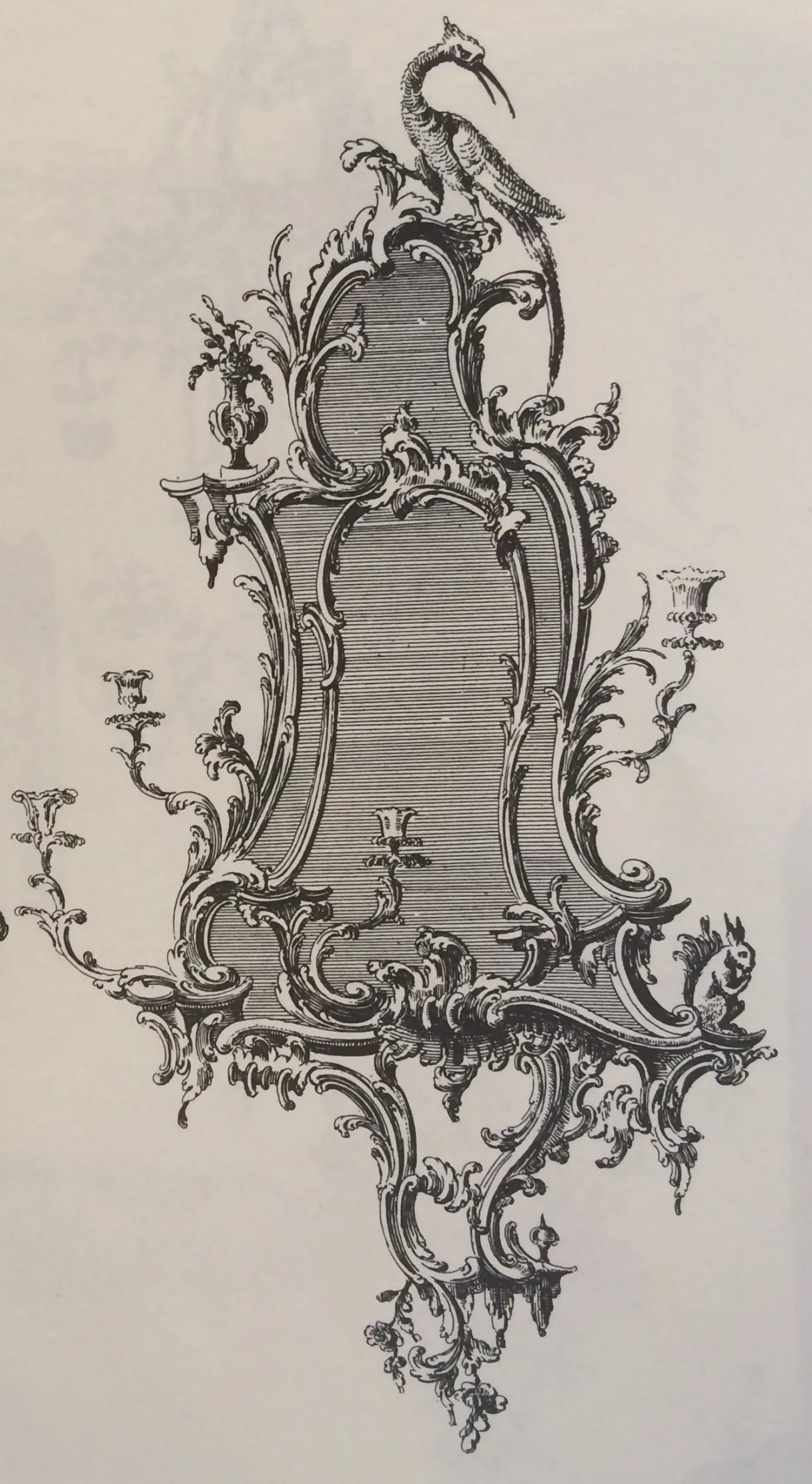
Rococo-style girandole with mirrors by Thomas Chippendale

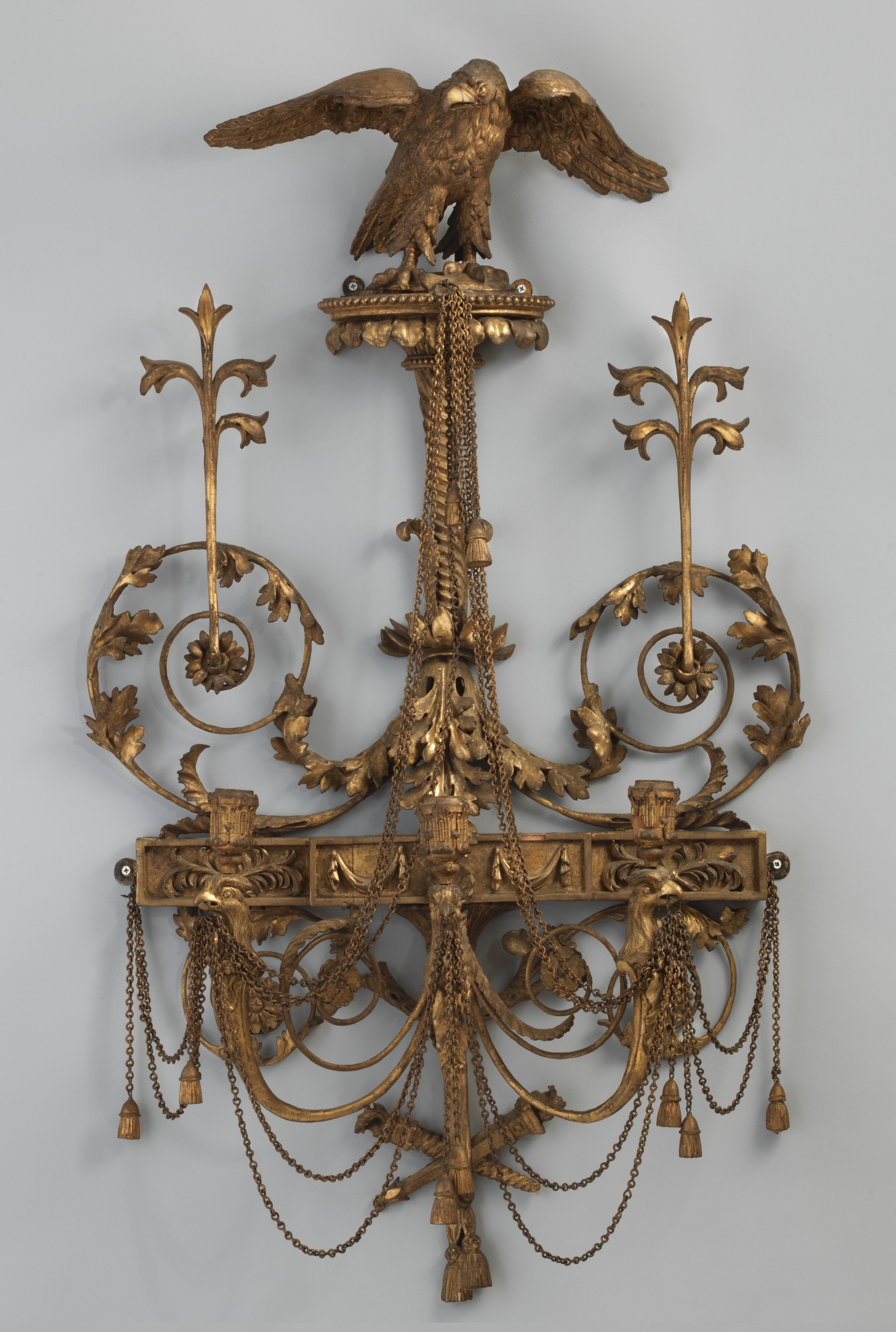
A late 18-century neo-Classical girandole

Girandoles was also designed as wall lights or sconces, and mirrors may be added to reflect the light. In England and France, mirrors with elaborate frames and candleholders attached were produced in the mid-18th century, many created in the ornate Rococo-style, and these were also referred to as girandoles. Thomas Chippendale produced girandoles, with and without mirrors, of asymmetric designs in Rococo, chinoiserie or Gothic styles. These consist of scrolls and shells incorporating various motifs such as architectural ruins, Chinese figures and pagodas, columns, foliage, waterfalls, and birds. The mirrors were usually fitted in smaller plates, and the joints then covered with gilt mouldings or pilasters. In the late-18th century, designs in the lighter Neo-Classical style were popular under the influence of Robert Adam. The elaborate Rococo style was revived in the mid-19th century but the quality was not as good compared to the previous era. Arms of candleholders may emerge from the sides of the mirror, or directly below it, but a girandole can also be positioned in front of the mirror such that it and its reflected image create the illusion of a full candelabra.

Towards the end of 18th century, circular convex mirrors were created for use in homes. The mirrors, referred to as "girandoles" or "girandole mirrors", have projecting curved arms for holding candles and were designed to created a pleasantly distorted reflections of the rooms they were in. These became popular in the Federal period (1790 to 1830) in the United States, where the mirrors were often topped with an eagle finial. Some may be topped with wing horses or dragons and the mirrors may range in size from one to three feet in diameter. In England, such mirrors also called girandole were often produced without candle holders.

A great variety of metals have been used for the creation of girandoles. In the case of candlesticks, gilded bronze has been a very frequent medium, but for table use silver may be used. Some girandoles are also made of hardwoods. The large wall-mounted girandole may be made of gilt carved wood.

== Gallery ==
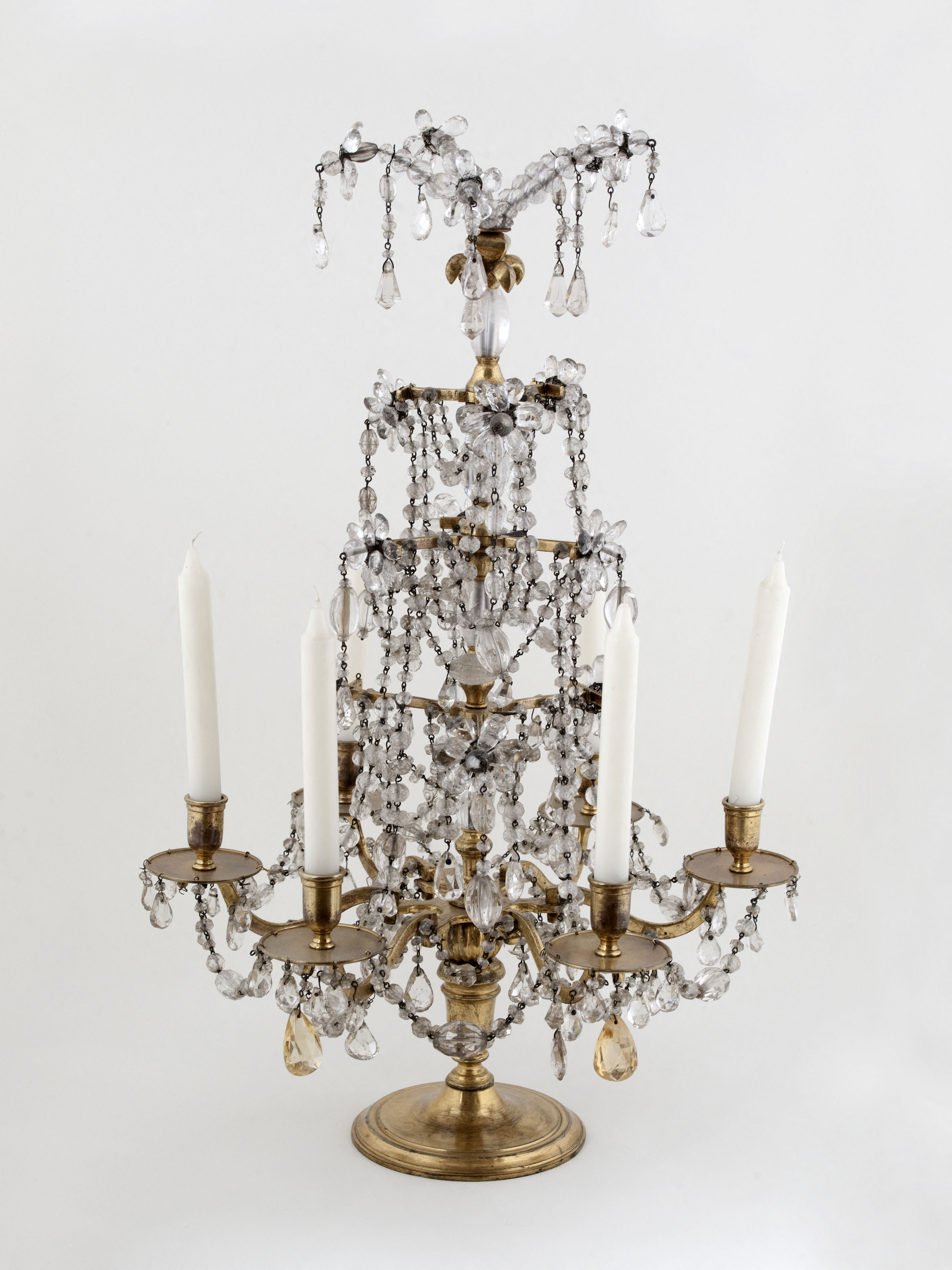
Louis XIV-era French girandole

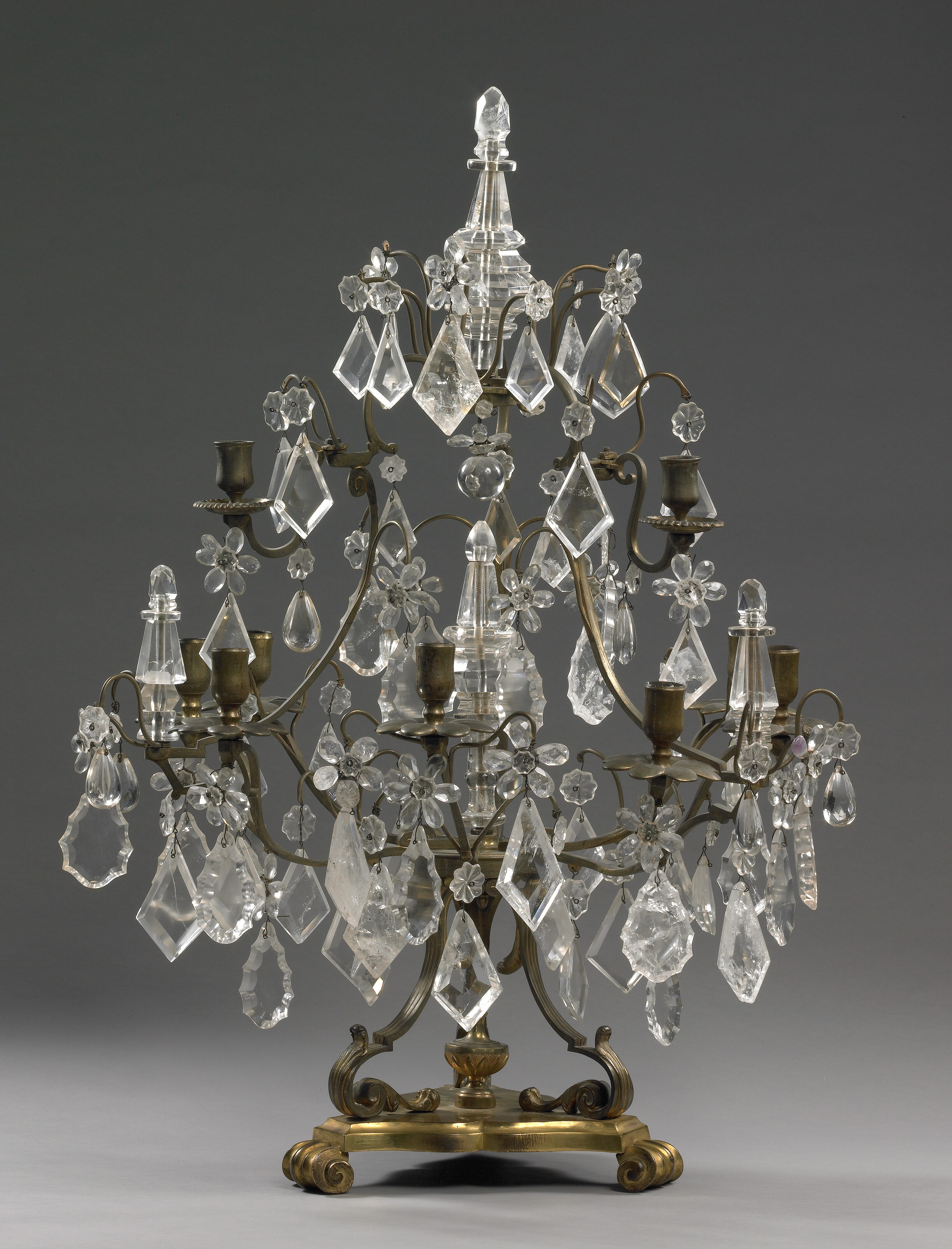
18th century French girandole

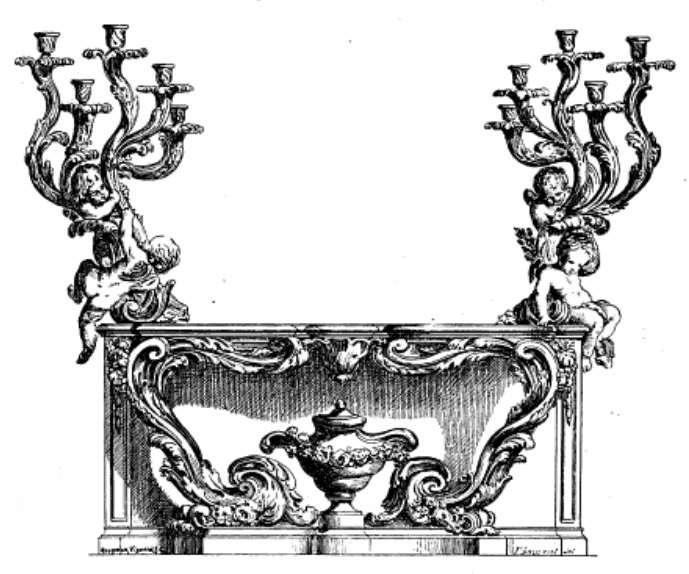
French design for a pair of girandoles

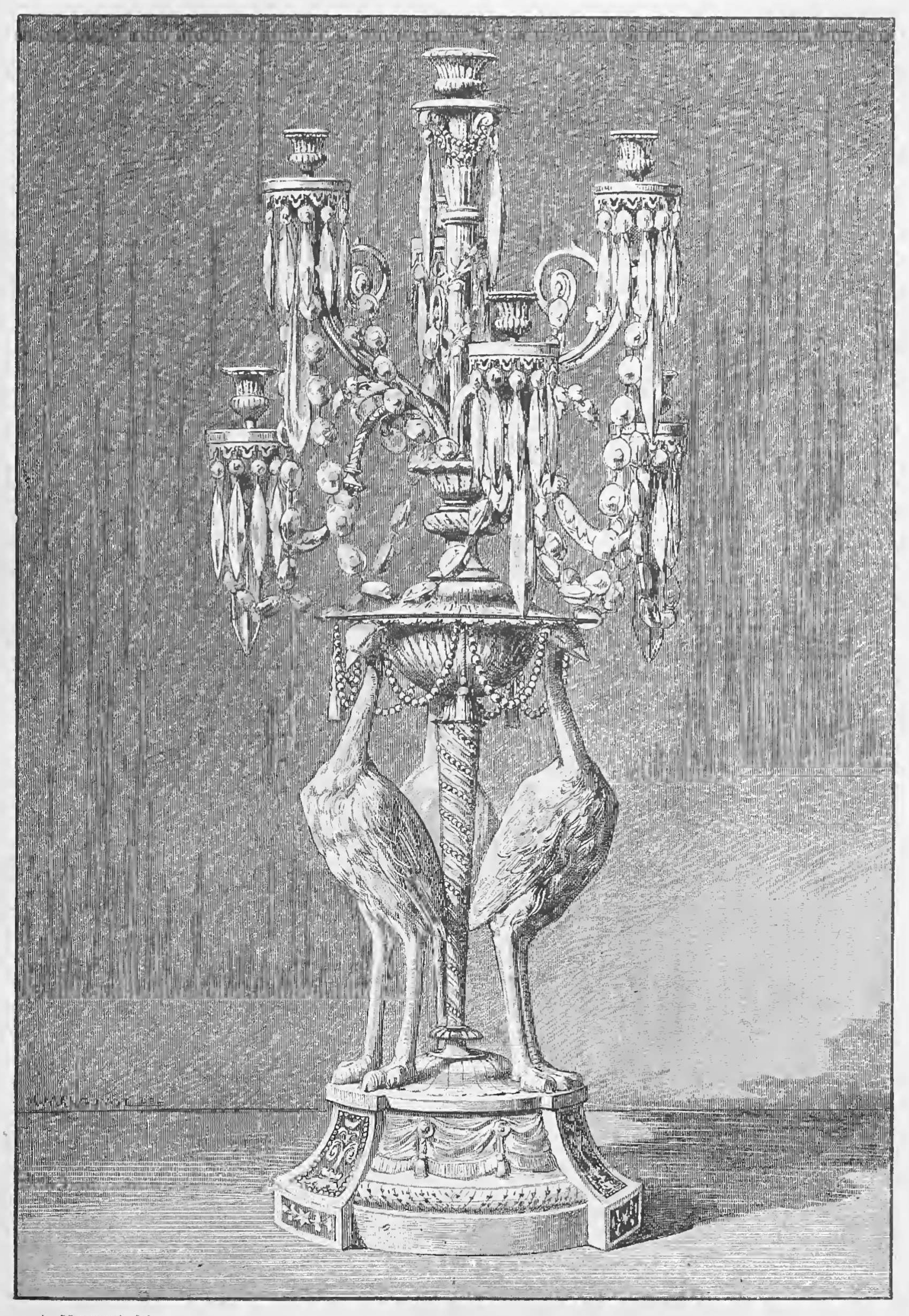
Girandole, Louis XVI period

18th-century French drawing of a girandole

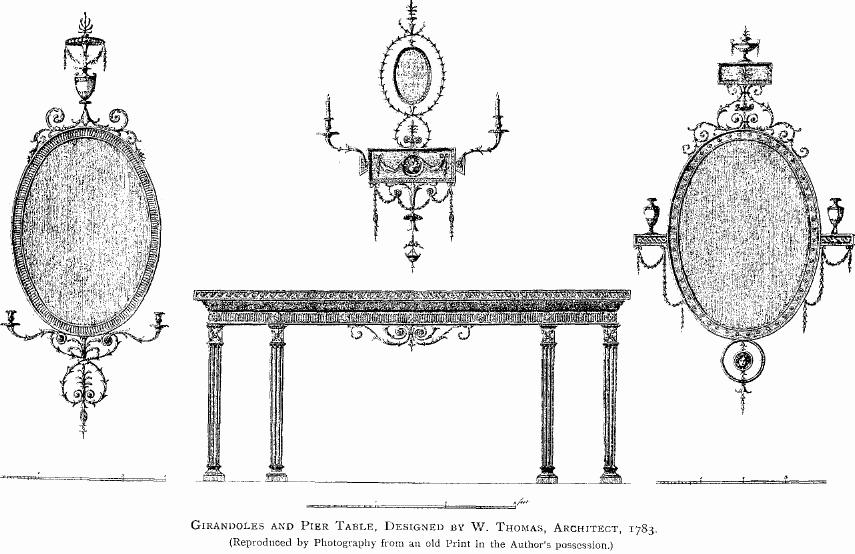
18th century English designs for girandoles and table

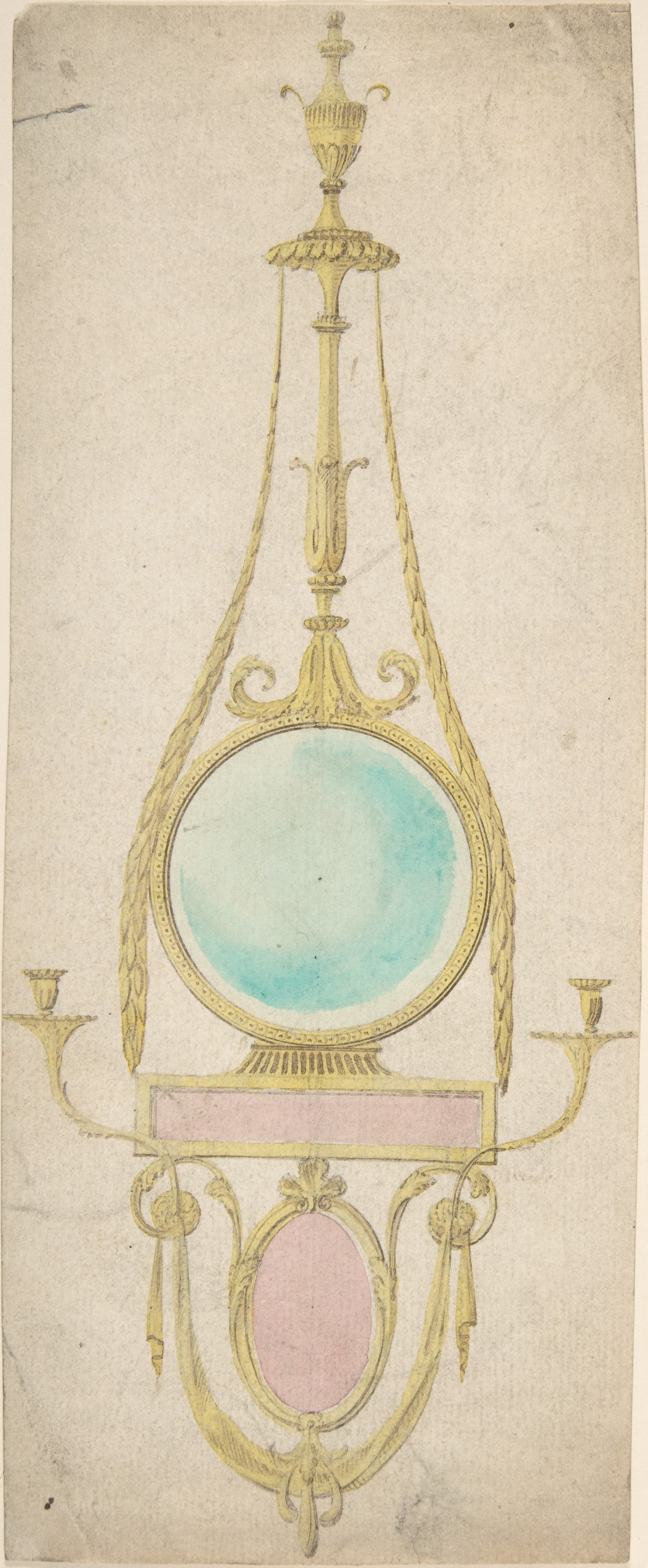
Design for a girandole

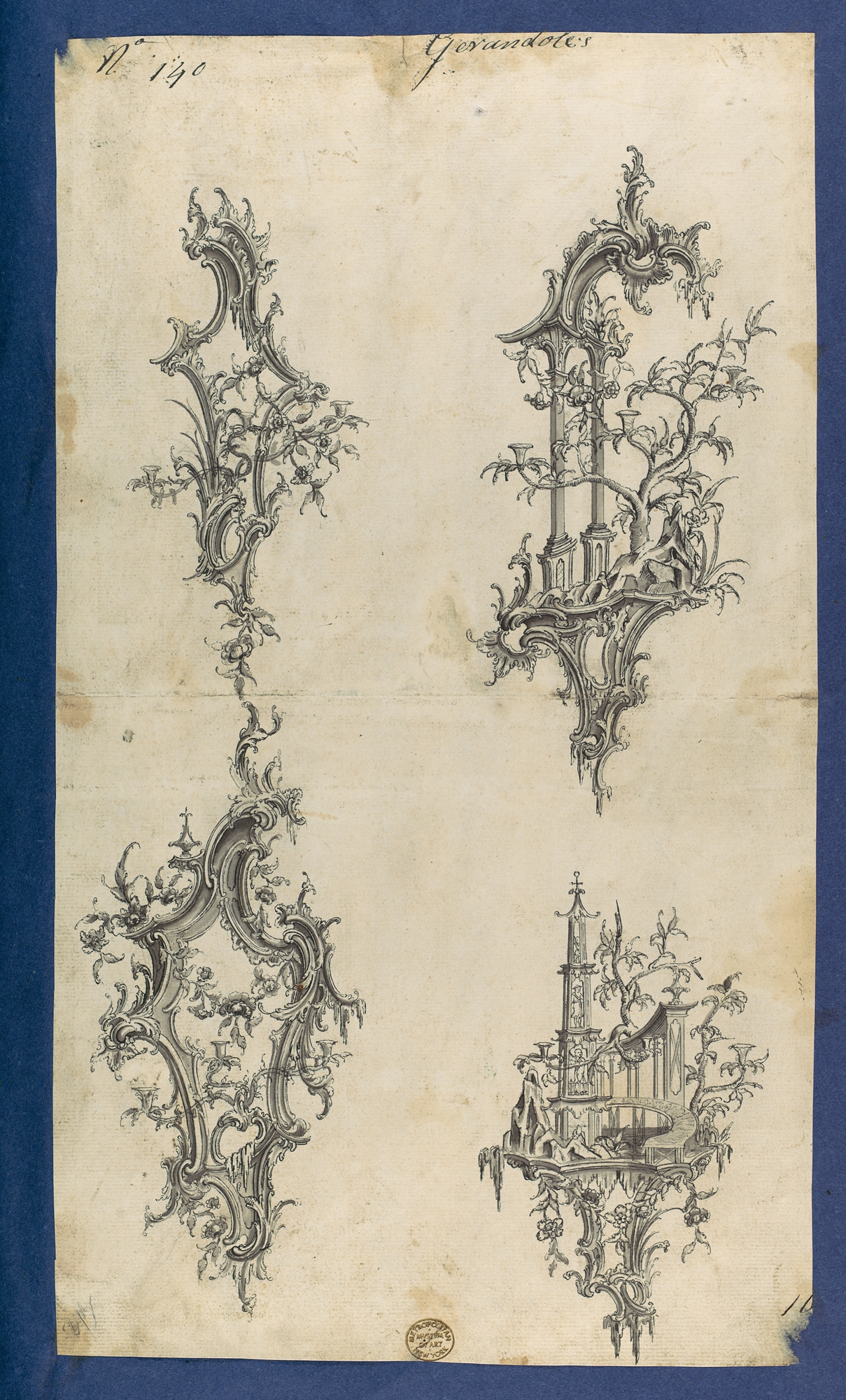
Four girandoles design by Chippendale

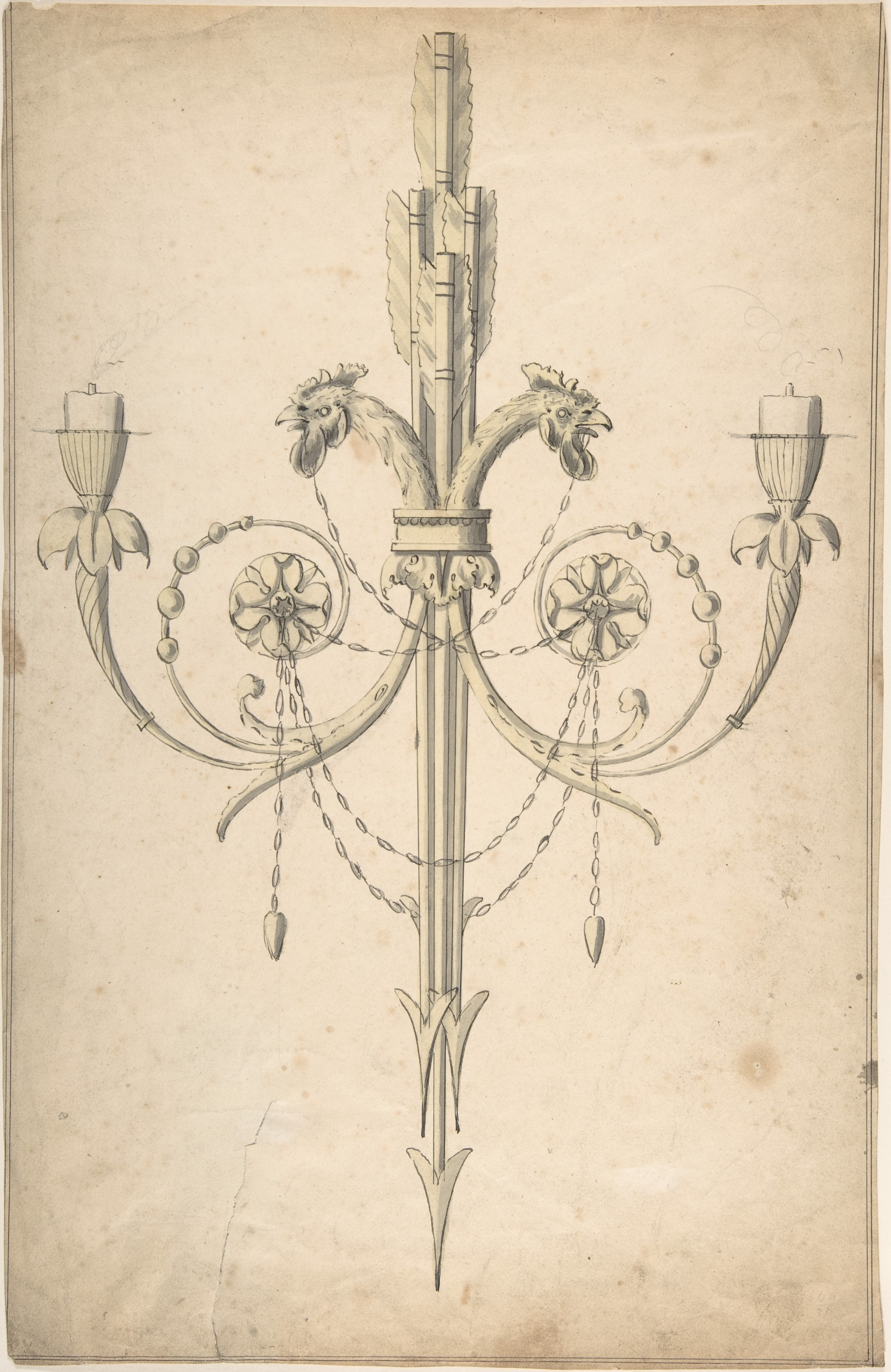
A design by William Chambers

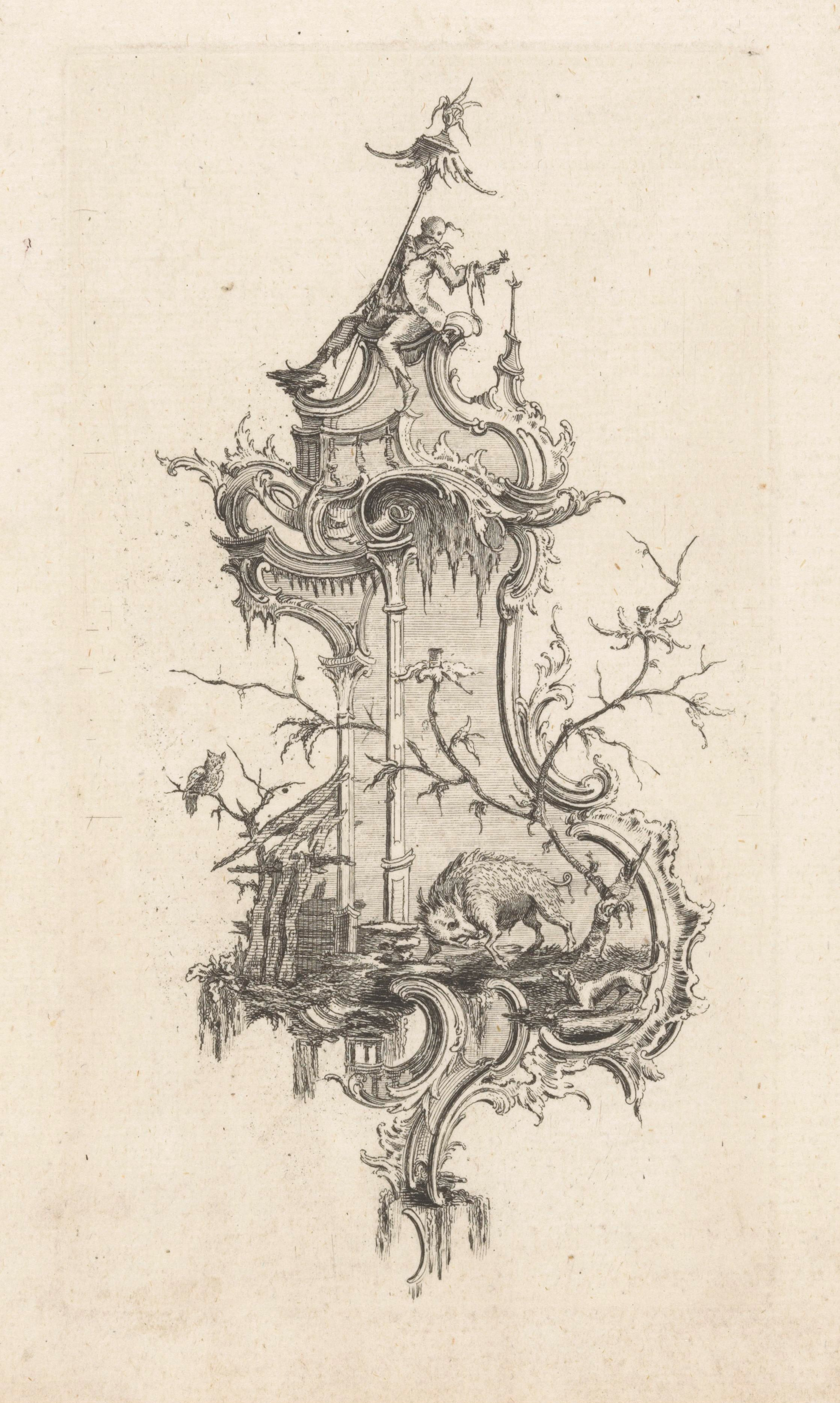
Design for a girandole by Thomas Johnson

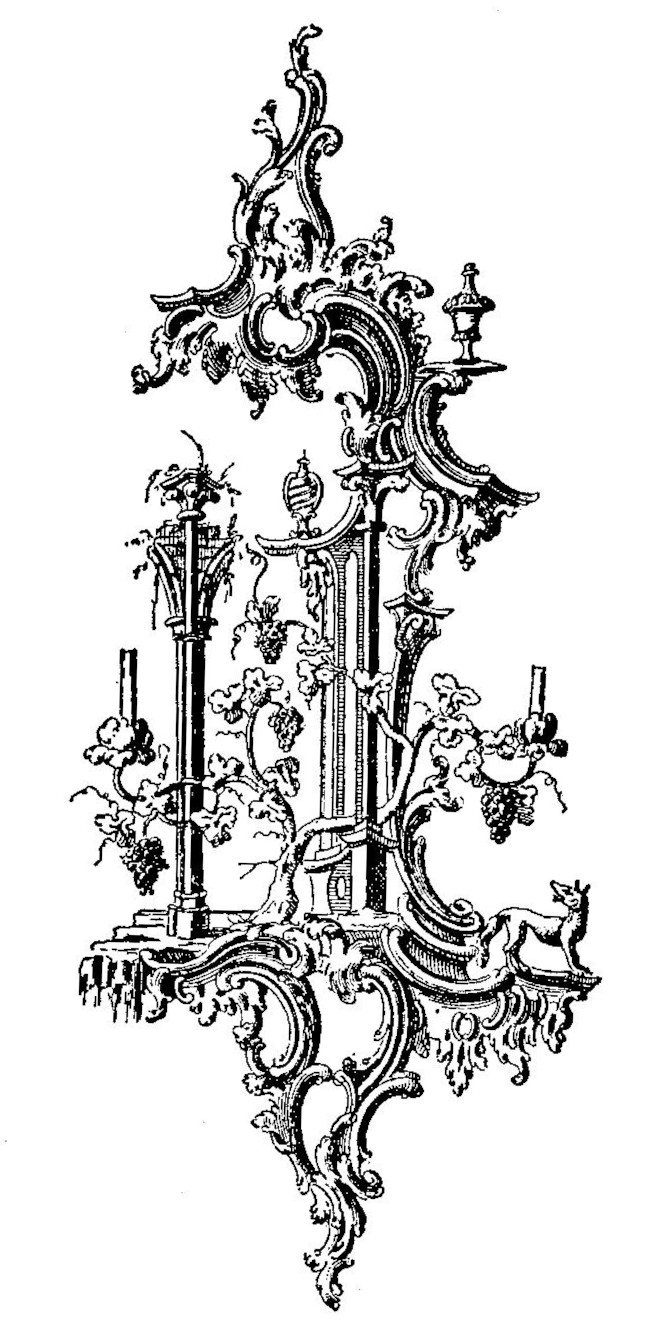
A girandole design by Thomas Chippendale

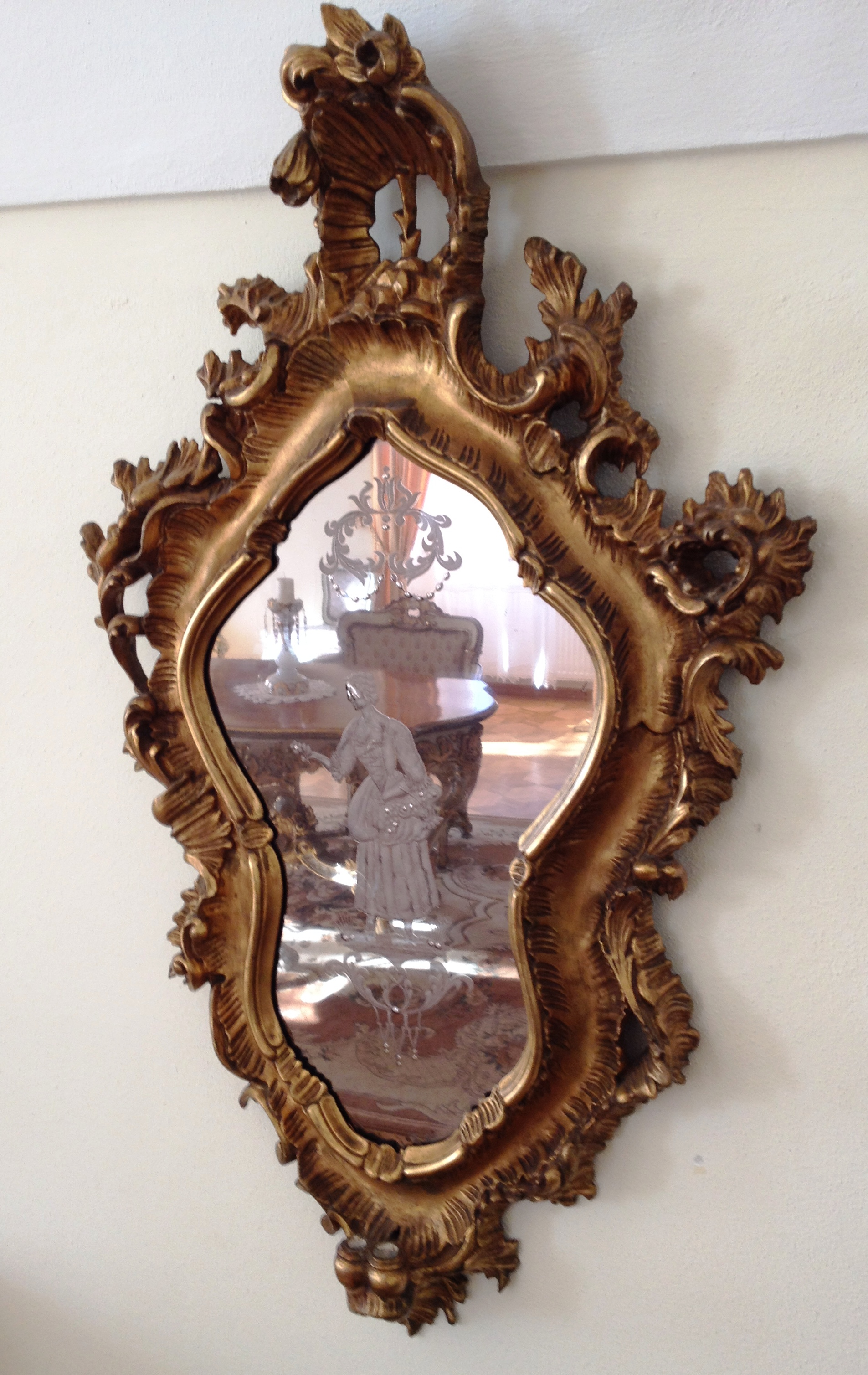
A Czech girandole

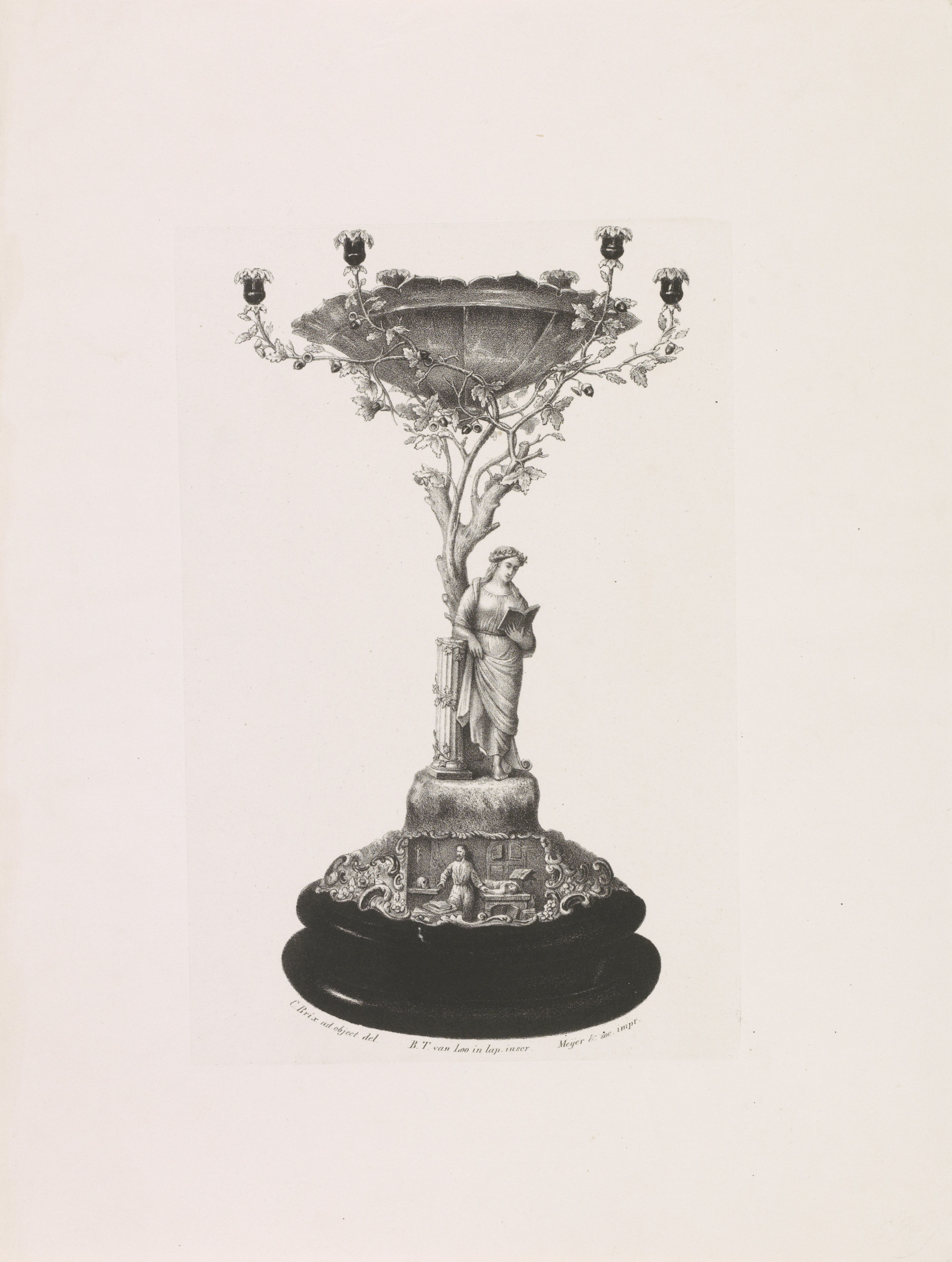
Dutch girandole (1856, Rijksmuseum)

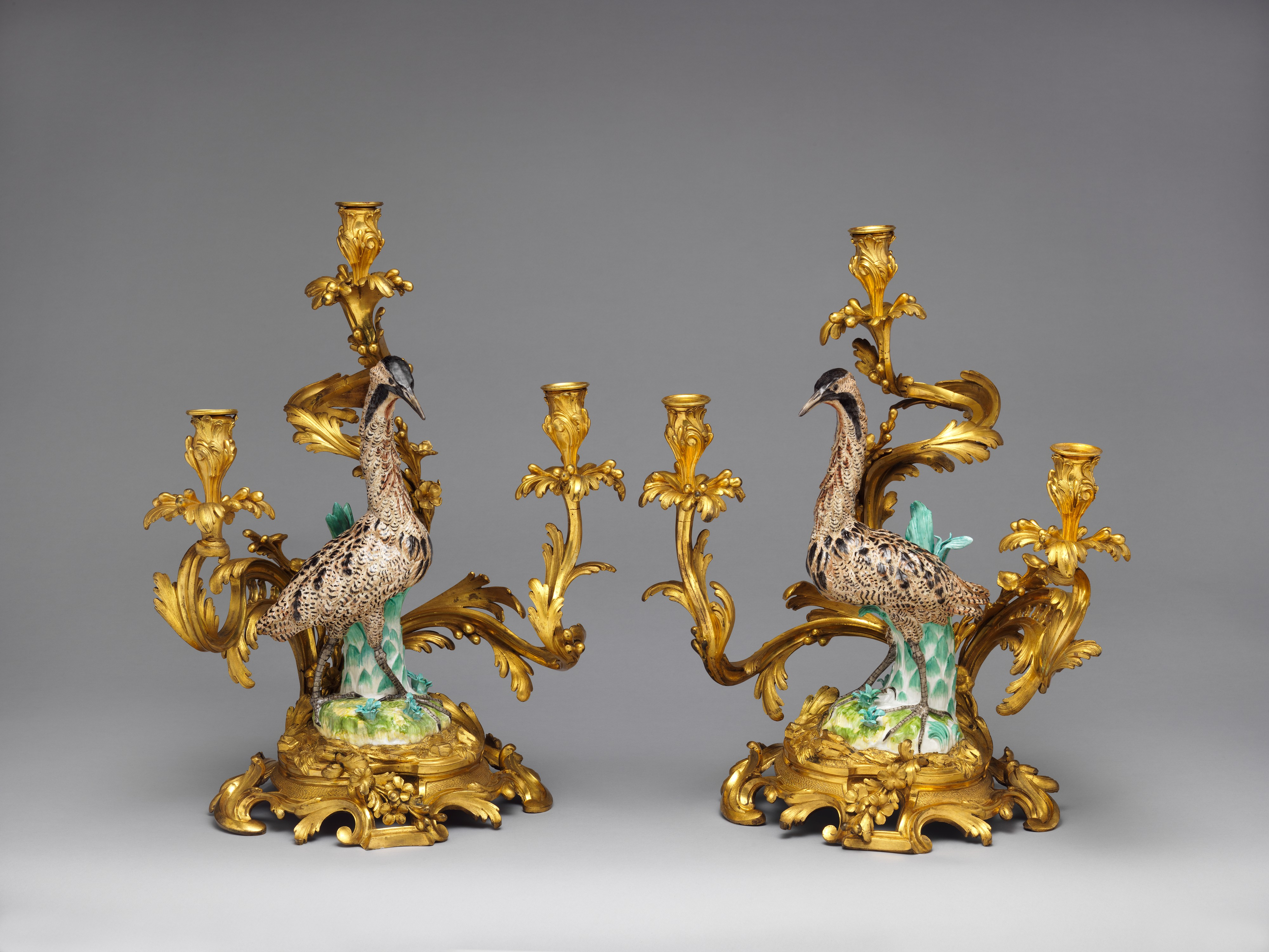
Meissen porcelain and gilt-bronze girandole

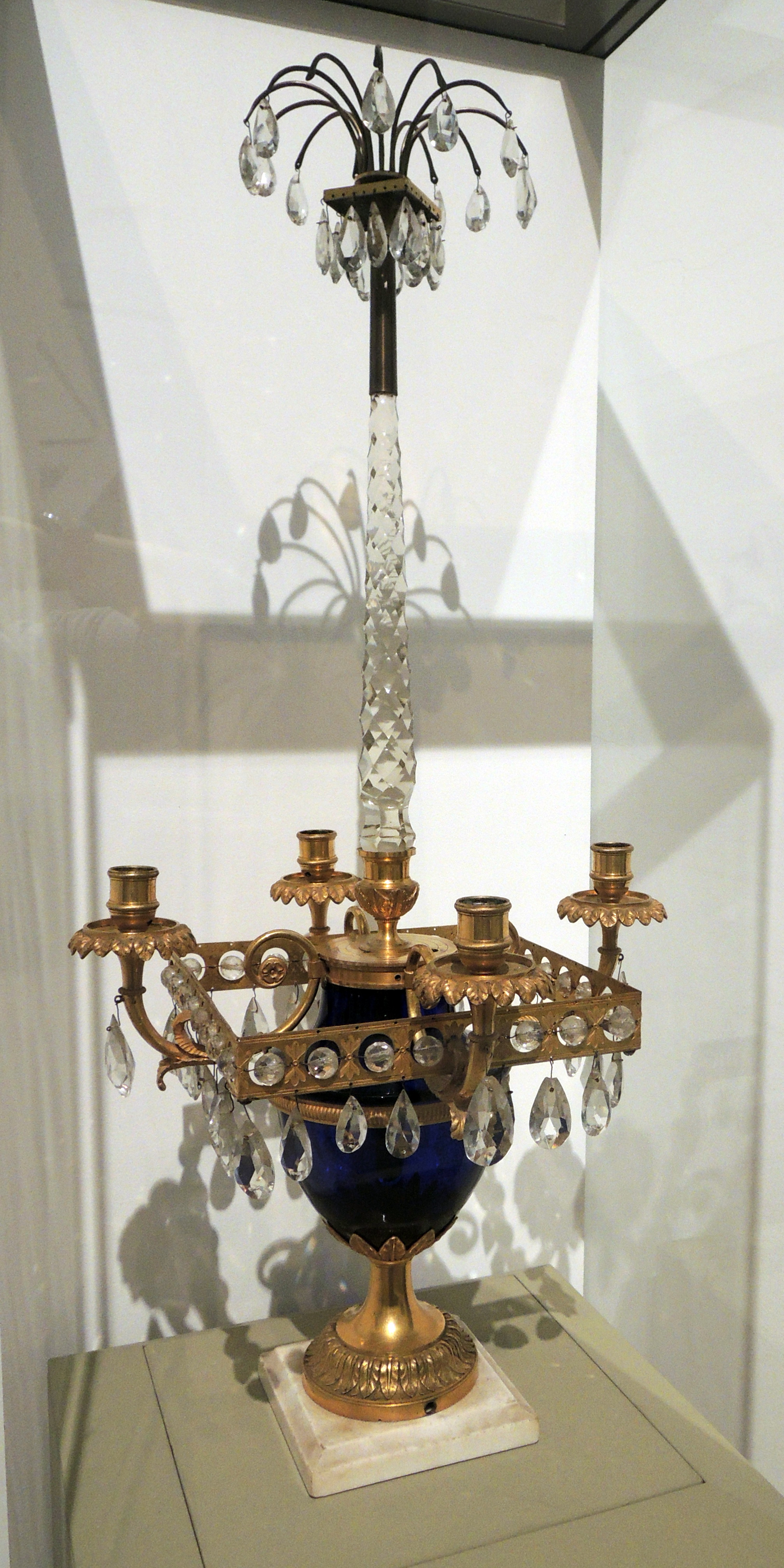
A Russian girandole

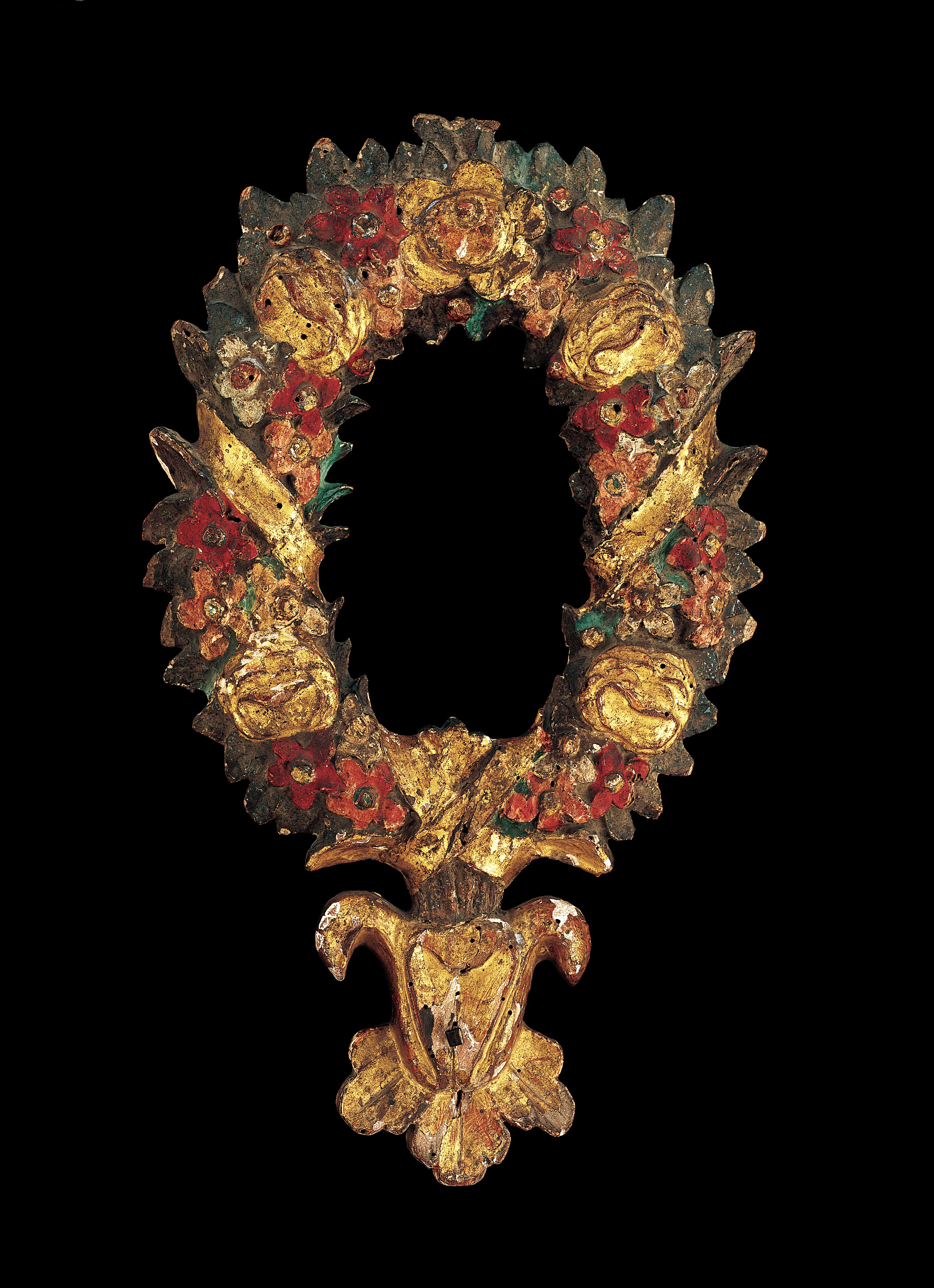
Late 18th century Italian girandole

Girandole earrings

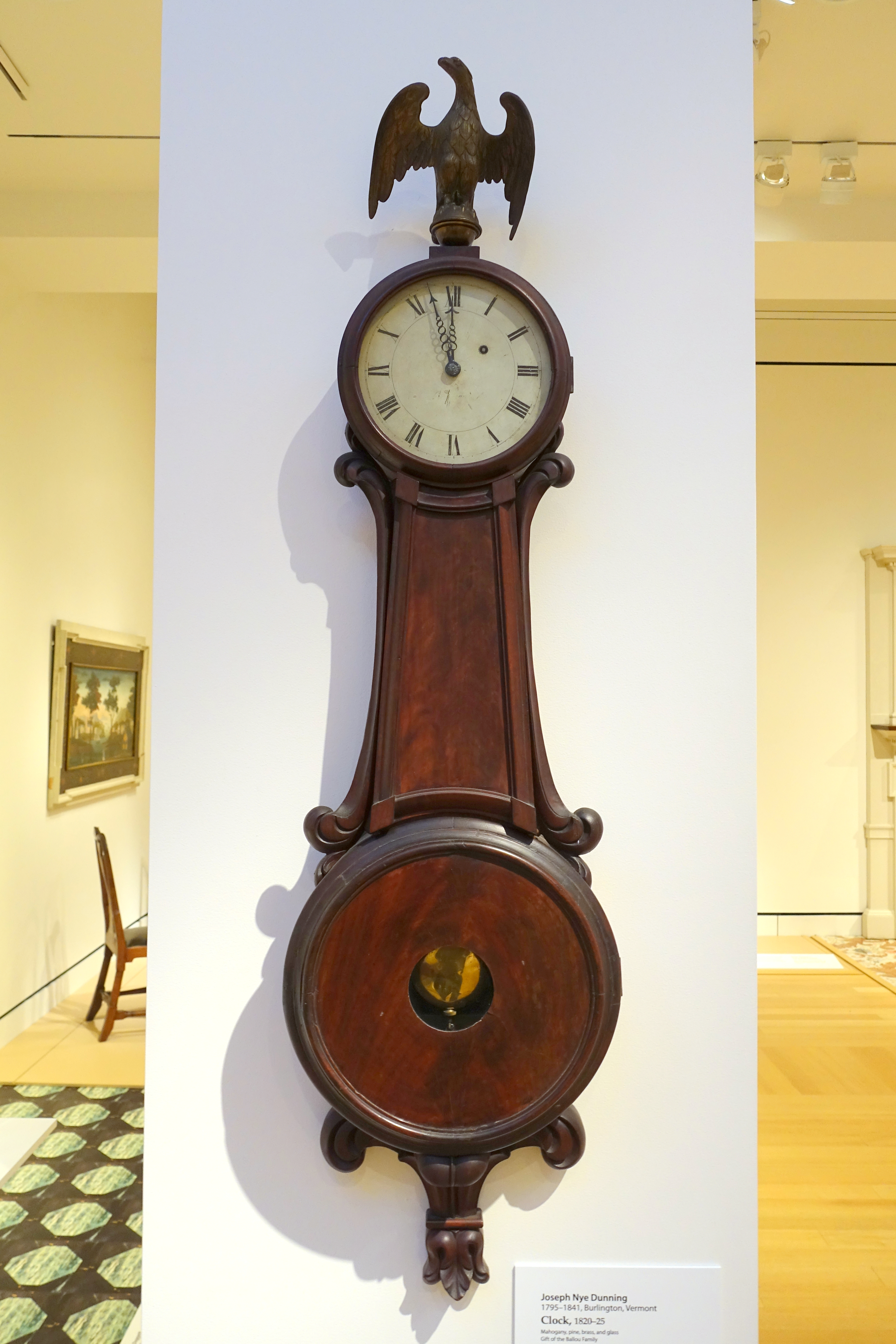
A girandole clock

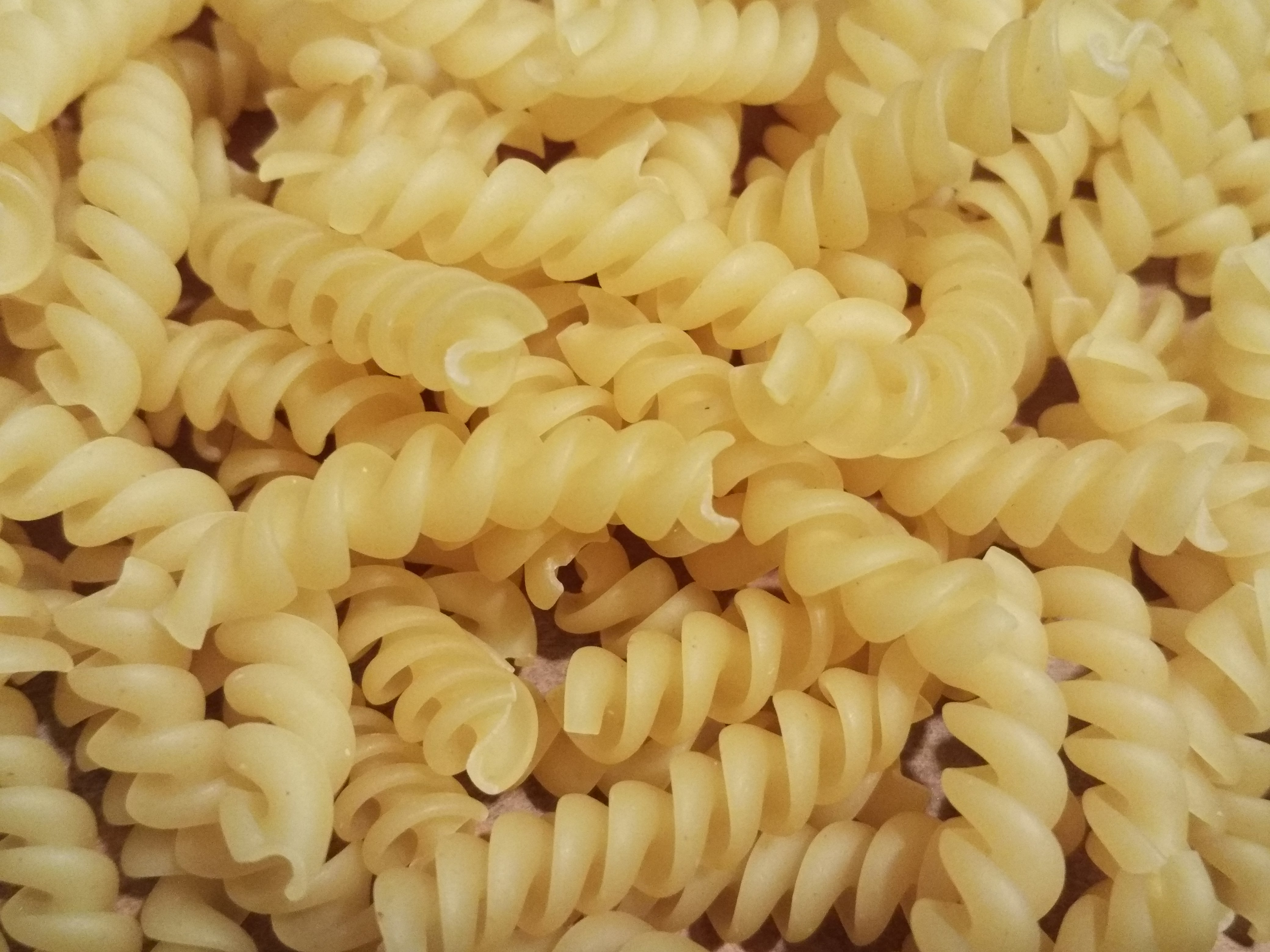
Girandole, a type of pasta similar to fusilli
