= Hogscraper candlestick =

The hogscraper candlestick is an early (c. 1780 – 1860) form of lighting device commonly used in 19th-century North America and Britain, and mainly manufactured in England. The device is manufactured of tempered sheet iron, wrought in several pieces and joined by metal joinery and silver soldering. The name is derived from the candlesticks resemblance to an antique device used to scrape bristles from hog hide after slaughter. The antique lighting device commonly consists of a shaft, attached to a round base with a thumb tab ejector mechanism to remove the residual candle stub, and a round lip or "bobèche" to collect candle drippings. The "bobèche" often has a hook extension used for hanging the device.

Some hogscraper candlesticks were manufactured with decorative brass or iron bands at the midsection of the shaft and are commonly referred to as "wedding band" hogscrapers. Often the devices are "signed" on the thumb ejector tab by the manufacturer. Historical trade directories have identified most of these manufacturers and the dates of their business existence. While most manufacturers have been identified to Birmingham there is evidence of manufacturing in Sheffield, England. There is no substantive evidence of American manufacturers before 1850.
