= Bobèche (clown) =

19th century French performer

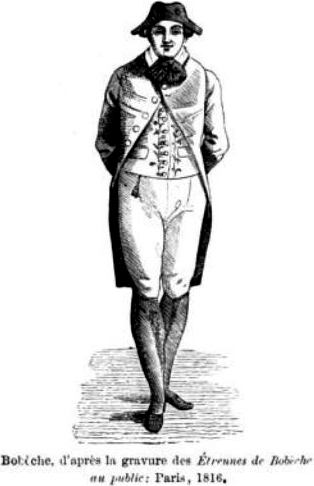
Bobèche

Antoine Mandelot, better known as Bobèche, was a French theatre clown, similar to a Merry Andrew, under the First Empire and the Restoration.

He was the son of an upholsterer of the St. Antoine faubourg. He was closely associated with Auguste Guérin, better known as Galimafré. These two comedians were very well known, and performed at the Boulevard du Temple in Paris for twenty years, at a time when theatres, acrobat schools and all kinds of spectacles were very popular. The two men had each abandoned their workshops and took on these simple names when devoting themselves to their profession.

As a child, he performed sketches with Guérin, in his father's workshop. This led to them being recruited by a master street acrobat named Dromale. Mandelot become Bobèche, and Guérin become Galimafré.

Bobèche was a tall, thin and emaciated boy, who played the standard comedic role of Jocrisse. Performing on trestle stages on the Boulevard du Temple, he wore a costume in the Lower Normandy style, consisting of yellow breeches, patterned stockings, a red jacket, straw-coloured wig, and a small horned hat adorned with a butterfly. One chronicler wrote: "Bobèche was original, blending Janot and Jocrisse, these two excellent creations of Volanges at Brunet. His face was distinguished, his manner shy, but this sardonic shyness reveals what is called a vacuous person from Sologne, which is to say a cunning chap, wily and meek. I can still picture his half-closed eye, his caustic smile, his lower lip raised to give his appearance an astonished, candid appearance. He was a comedian in this great red coat, and under that grey, horned hat, decked out with a butterfly!".
