= Candlestick =

Device used to hold a candle in place

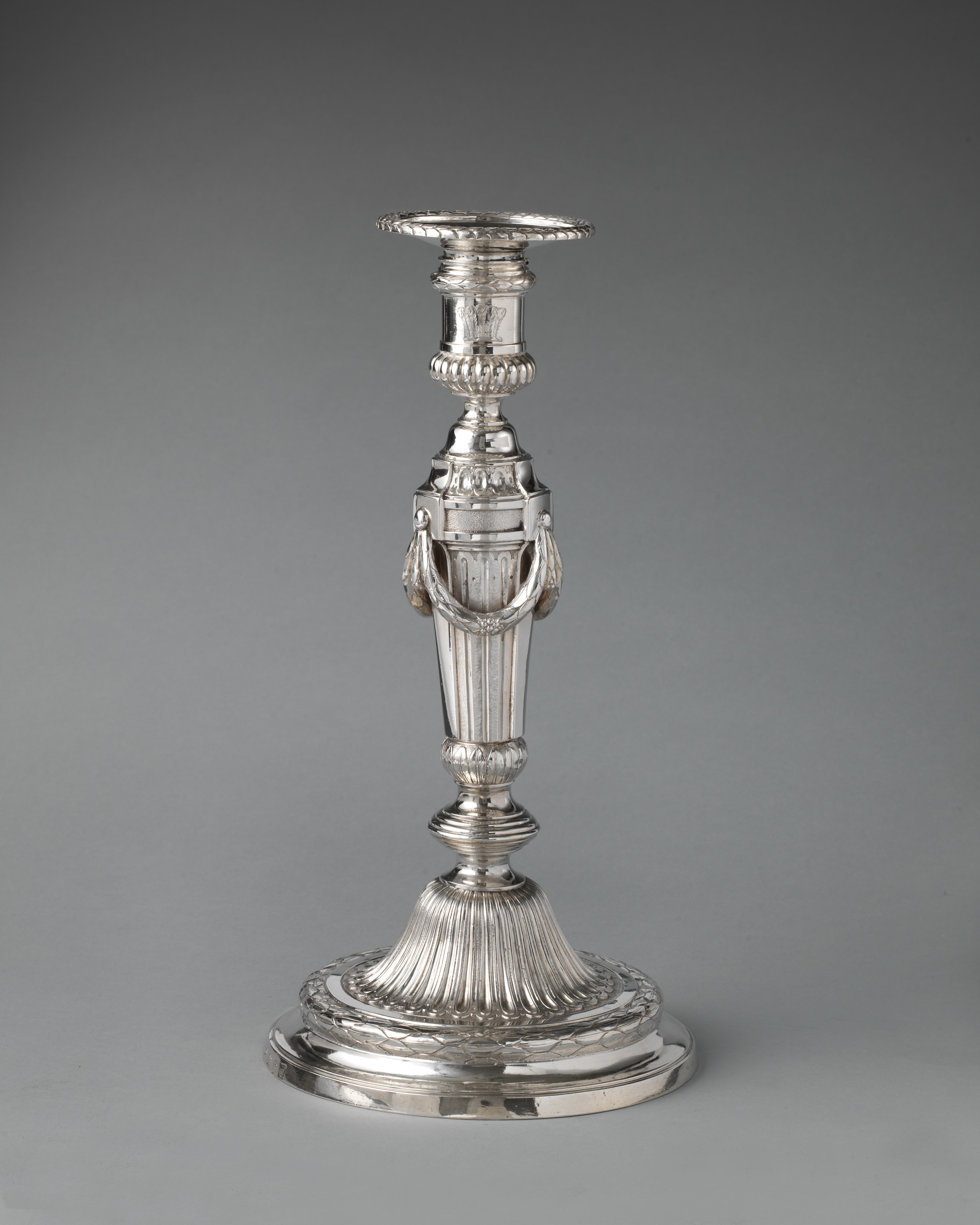
British Neoclassical silver candlestick, 1774–1775; overall height: 29.5 cm. Metropolitan Museum of Art (New York City).

A candlestick (or candleholder) is a device used to hold a candle upright in place. Most candlesticks have a cup, a spike (called a "pricket"), or both to secure the candle.

Before the widespread adoption of electricity, candles were carried between rooms using a chamberstick—a short candlestick with a pan to catch dripping wax.

Although electric lighting has largely replaced candles in daily use, candlesticks and candelabras remain common as decorative objects or for creating ambience during special occasions such as dinners, religious ceremonies, and commemorations.

== Religious use ==
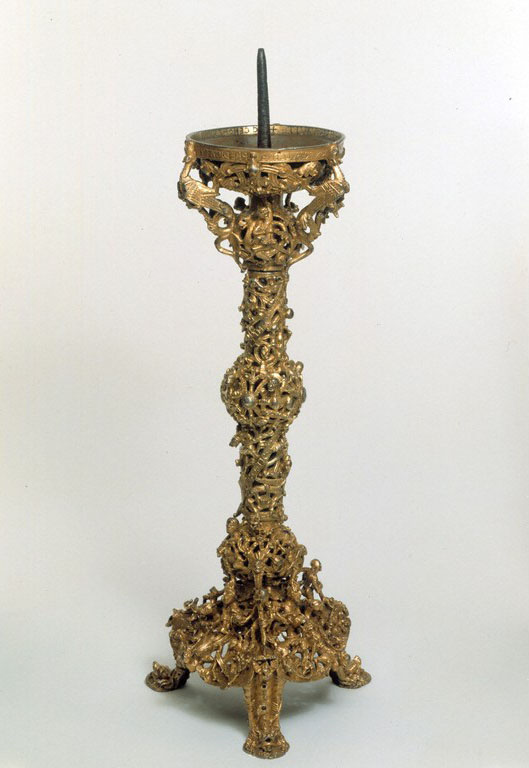
The 12th-century Gloucester Candlestick, noted for its intricate Romanesque design.

Candles and candlesticks are widely used in religious rituals as both functional and symbolic lights.

In Judaism, two candles are lit to mark the beginning of the Sabbath each Friday evening, and candlesticks are often displayed prominently in homes. A seven-branched candelabra, known as the menorah, is a national symbol of the State of Israel, modeled after the candelabrum once used in the Temple in Jerusalem. Another common Jewish candelabra is the Hanukiah, the special Hanukkah menorah with eight branches and a ninth candle for lighting the others.

Tall candlesticks and altar lamps are also found in many Christian churches.

In Eastern Catholic and Eastern Orthodox traditions, bishops use the dikirion and trikirion—two- and three-branched candlesticks—to bless congregations during worship. A triple candlestick was also used in the Catholic Church before 1955.

== See also ==
- Bobèche
- Gloucester Candlestick
- Hogscraper candlestick
- Candlestick pattern
