= Bobèche =

Lamp component

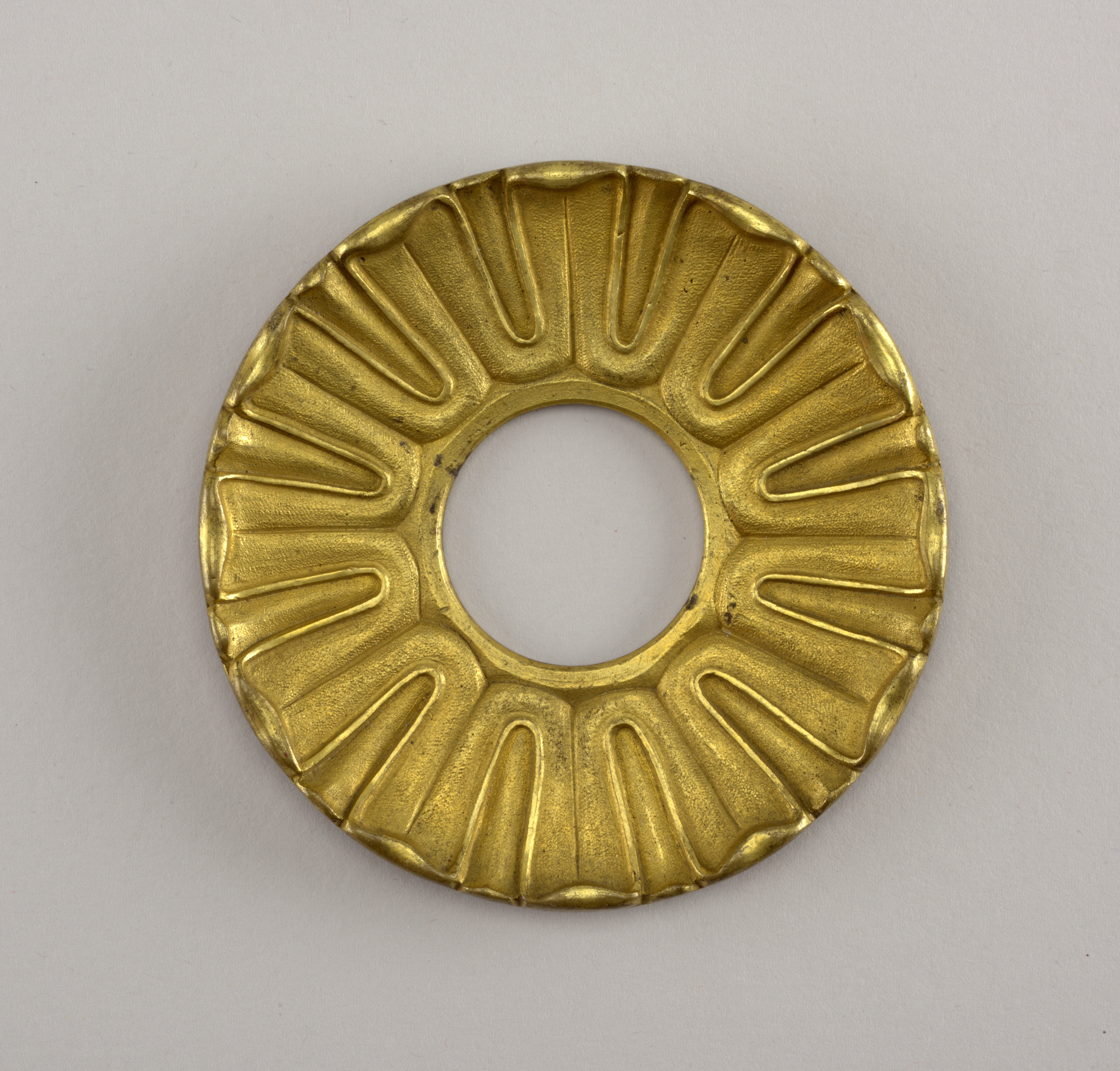
A bobèche

A bobèche is an American or French term for an annular device used for catching wax, or for an ornamental element taking the same form. On a candlestick, the part can take the form of a dish-like ring, while in a chandelier it may be shaped like a bowl. They can be made of glass or brass or paper as well. Bobèches are often removable to allow for cleaning.
